= Long Tom =

Long Tom may refer to:

- Long Tom River, in Oregon, United States
- Long Tom Pass, a mountain pass in Mpumalanga, South Africa
- Long Tom Commando, a light infantry regiment of the South African Army
- Long Tom (fish), common name for the Belonidae or Needlefish
- Long Tom (rocket), an Australian sounding rocket
- Long Tom (cannon), a generic name for some early cannon and field guns, more specifically:
  - 155 mm Long Tom, a US World War II era field gun
  - 155 mm Creusot Long Tom, a Boer War field gun
- Major Thomas J. "Long Tom" Roberts, fictional character in the Doc Savage stories
- "Long Tom" Watson, protagonist in the Long Tom's treasure legend
- Long Tom Hughes (1878–1956), American baseball player
