= Tanner Trail =

Grand Canyon hiking trail

Coordinates: 36.04°N 111.85°W

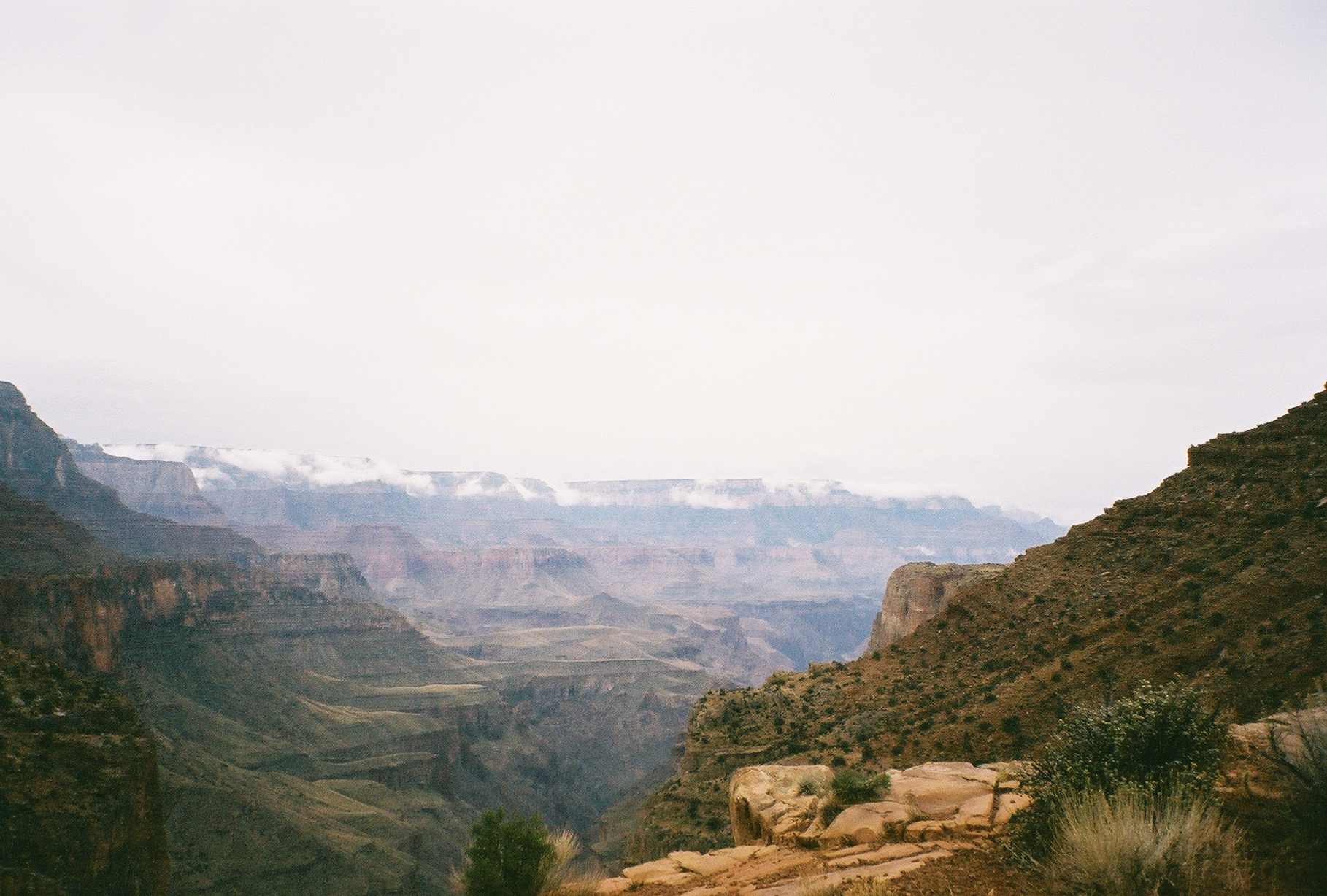
- A view of Tanner Canyon
- Length: 9 mi (14 km)
- Location: Grand Canyon National Park, Arizona, United States
- Trailheads: Lipan Point; Colorado River; Grand Canyon (South Rim)
- Use: Hiking; Backpacking
- Elevation change: 4,750 ft (1,450 m)
- Highest point: Lipan Point, 7,400 ft (2,300 m)
- Lowest point: Colorado River, 2,650 ft (810 m)
- Difficulty: Very strenuous
- Season: Early Spring to Late Fall
- Sights: Grand Canyon; Colorado River
- Hazards: Severe weather Overexertion; Dehydration; Flash flood

The Tanner Trail is a hiking trail located on the South Rim of the Grand Canyon National Park, located in the U.S. state of Arizona. The trailhead is located at Lipan Point, a prominent lookout located to the east of the Grand Canyon Village, and the trail ends at the Colorado River at Tanner Rapids.

== History ==
The Tanner Trail started out as an ancient Anasazi and Hopi route to the Colorado River. Most believe today that Tanner Canyon is where García López de Cárdenas became the first European to encounter the Grand Canyon. The trail is named after Seth Tanner, a 19th-century prospector who improved the trail so he would have better access to his copper mine. It is also believed that Tanner Canyon was once used as an old horse thief trail where buried gold known as Long Tom's treasure is located. The horse thieves would use the canyon to bring the horses from Arizona into Utah. While in the canyon, the horse thieves would change the brands of the horses, then they would cross the Colorado River and drive the horses out of the canyon through the Nankoweap Trail up onto the North Rim. The canyon was once named Horsethief Canyon in honor of this storied past.

== Access ==
Entrance to the South Rim of the Grand Canyon can be accessed by two points: the south entrance via State Route 64 north from Williams, and the east entrance via State Route 64 west from U.S. Route 89. The trailhead for the Tanner Trail is located near the parking area at Lipan Point, which can be accessed by the Desert View Drive. Hikers are advised to park at Lipan Point, as the trailhead is located just before the parking lot at Lipan Point.

== Description ==
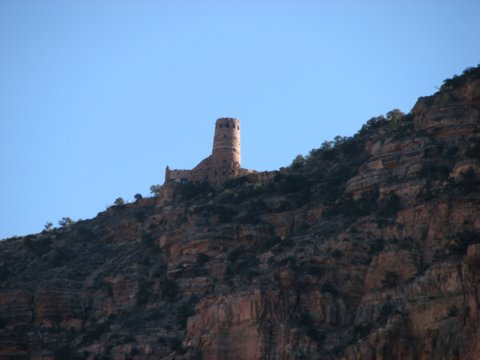
The Desert View Watchtower from the Tanner Trail.

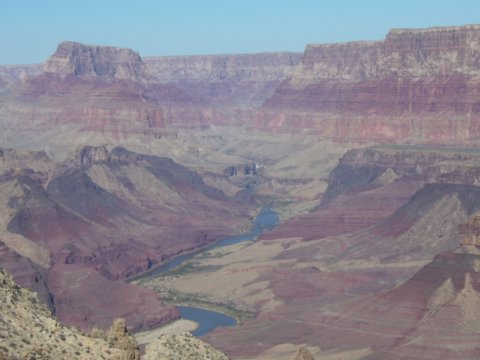
The Colorado River from the Tanner Trail.

The Tanner trailhead begins at the information sign just before Lipan Point. The trail starts out by crossing the rim plateau to the canyon edge. It then enters the Tanner Canyon and starts a series of switchbacks, which become very steep and rocky. The descent is considered to be one of the steepest rim descents in the Grand Canyon. The trail goes through the Kaibab Formation and becomes even steeper in the Coconino sandstone and the Hermit shale. It finally reaches the Supai group, where the ridge between Tanner Canyon and Seventyfive Mile Canyon is located.

The trail then enters into the Tanner Canyon creek for a short time, then it leaves the creek. It then makes a long yet moderate crossing of the Supai group. There are many suitable campsites along this stretch, while it passes Escalante and then Cardenas Buttes. The trail passes below these buttes and descends into a boulder-strewn plateau. It then turns to the north to the end of the plateau.

At this point the trail makes its second major descent, dropping off the plateau into the lower Tanner Canyon. There are some switchbacks yet the trail mainly descends straight down around 800 ft (240 m) to a red saddle below where there are a few campsites. From the saddle, the trail levels out, although there is still a gradual rate of descent. The trail follows the west side of Tanner Canyon, slowly descending to the streambed below. When the streambed is reached, the trail crosses over to the east side and up onto the river plateau. It crosses this small plateau and drops into the campground. Campsites can be found to the east and the west

Mileages and features along the Tanner Trail
| Distance (mi) | Elv (ft) | Location | Trail Junction |
|---|---|---|---|
| 0 | 7400 | Lipan Point, South Rim | Trailhead |
| 1.9 | 5660 | 75 Mile Saddle | None |
| 3.5 | 5700 | Below Cardenas Butte | None |
| 9 | 2650 | Tanner Campgrounds | Beamer Trail; Escalante Route |

=== Condition ===
The trail is categorized as a primitive trail and receives little maintenance by trail crews and very few patrols by park rangers. This trail is only recommended for seasoned hikers, as it is very steep, rocky, has very little shade, and the only water source is the Colorado River. The trail is fairly well worn, and mostly easy to follow, although it is one of the longer trails in the Canyon. Extreme care and preparation should always be taken in attempting a trail in the Grand Canyon.

=== Water availability ===
The only reliable source of water along the Tanner Trail is the Colorado River. Seasonal water may be found in the Tanner Canyon. Hikers can check with the Backcountry Information Center for updates on all seasonal water sources, which are regularly checked by other hikers and Park rangers. All water in the Grand Canyon must be treated before consumption. The National Park Service recommends boiling, iodine tablets, or filters in order to purify the water. If water is taken from the Colorado River, the Park recommends letting the water sit so the sediment will settle.

=== Camping ===
Camping in the Tanner Trail area is at-large. There are multiple "campsites" along the trail, but the main camp area is located at Tanner Rapids, a spot that is popular to rafters. The camp area is located at the end of the Trail, situated between the dunes to west and the river to the east. The camp area has a pit toilet located in the middle of the campsites. The sand dunes to west are off-limits to camping and foot-travel, as the Park is attempting to revegetate and stabilize the area .

Overnight camping areas along Tanner Trail.
| Area | Name | Type | Group(s) | | Parties | Max People |
|---|---|---|---|---|---|---|
| BB9 | Tanner Rapids | Primitive | 1 | and | 3 | 29 |

=== Hazards ===
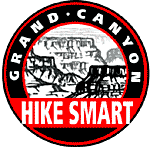

Hazards hikers can encounter along the Tanner Trail include dehydration, heat stroke, exhaustion, sudden rainstorms, flash flooding, loose footing, rockfall, encounters with wildlife, extreme heat, and getting lost. At the Colorado River, additional hazards include hypothermia (due to the river's consistently cold temperatures), trauma (due to collisions with boulders in rapids), and drowning. Extreme care, caution, and preparation should always be used when entering the Grand Canyon.

Hikers also need to remember that the Grand Canyon is located in the desert, and as such there are many dangerous desert species to watch out for. These include all types of scorpions, snakes, spiders, centipedes, mice, deer, big horn sheep, and mountain lions. The most dangerous and venomous of these animals are the black widow spider, the Arizona bark scorpion, and the rattlesnake.

== See also ==
- List of trails in Grand Canyon National Park
- Desert View Watchtower
- Tanner Graben at Tanner Rapids
