= Desert View Drive =

Scenic road near the Grand Canyon, Arizona

The Desert View Drive is a scenic road located on the South Rim of the Grand Canyon. The road runs from the Grand Canyon Village to Route 64 (AZ), passing by many scenic points and trails. The road is named after the Desert View Watchtower. There are many points along the way for tourists to stop at.
