= Seth Tanner =

American explorer (1828–1918)

Seth Benjamin Tanner
- Born: March 6, 1828; Bolton, New York, US
- Died: December 3, 1918 (aged 90); Taylor, Arizona, US
- Occupations: explorer, settler, prospector, stockman, Indian trader
- Spouse(s): Charlotte Levi, Anna Marie Jensen
- Children: 7

Seth Benjamin Tanner (March 6, 1828 – December 3, 1918) was a Mormon pioneer, miner, and early settler of Arizona. Tanner Trail in the Grand Canyon National Park was named after him.

== Life ==
Tanner was the son of John Tanner and Elizabeth Beswick. He was born in Bolton Landing, New York, and was with his father's family as they were driven across the United States from place to place with the early Mormons. By the time he reached Salt Lake City in 1848, Tanner was 20 years old.

Soon after arriving in Salt Lake City, Tanner left for the California gold rush with his older brother Myron. In 1851, he and Myron joined other family members in helping to settle San Bernardino. For a time, Seth and his brothers made money breaking in semi-wild horses and driving them up from California to sell in Salt Lake. In 1856, he went to San Diego for a while to invest in the coal business with some partners and prospect for coal, although they did not find much success in this venture.

Tanner married Charlotte Levi in 1858 in Pine Valley, Washington County, Utah, and they settled in North Ogden and had seven children. After Charlotte's death in 1872, Tanner moved his family to Payson to be near other family members. In 1875, he was chosen by Brigham Young to go on an exploring mission with James S. Brown to Arizona, to search out a suitable place for settlement on the Little Colorado River. He later returned to Utah Territory and married Anna Maria Jensen in 1876, then moved his family to Arizona, to an isolated cabin on the Little Colorado River near Tuba City, on the present-day Navajo reservation. Apparently his cabin was on the main travel route and visitors often stopped over there. Wilford Woodruff, fourth president of the Church of Jesus Christ of Latter-day Saints (LDS Church), mentioned it when on the underground, hiding out from the federal marshals. Tanner's second wife had no children of her own, but raised the children of Tanner's first wife in this lonely cabin in the wilderness.

Tanner also helped with the Hole-In-The-Rock expedition; he joined the expedition as a guide for the initial exploring party, guiding them up to the Bluff area after they had reached Moenkopi in the Navajo country. The whole expedition would have been much better off had they followed the route which Seth showed them, instead of taking the insane "short cut" down through the hole and across the redrock country. This "short cut" took them six months, instead of the six weeks it took to go the "long way" around.

Apparently Tanner got along well with both the Navajo and Hopi Indians; he and his children learned their languages, and they called him by a Navajo name, Hastiin Shush, which meant "Mr. Bear," and his sons were known as Shush Yaz, or "Little Bear." Tanner's descendants even today operate a chain of Indian trading posts throughout the Southwest. "He was often appointed to deal with the natives, having the happy faculty of making friends with them ... Seth was a modest man but he was always thoughtful of others, and during his travels and life-long experiences when he was associated with others in travel, he was generally set apart as a hunter and fisher and to provide meat for the company." Tanner was a gentle, solitary man of the desert, and he did a lot of traveling and exploring through Northern Arizona. He engaged in prospecting and mining in the area, but does not seem to have had too much success in these ventures. It is said that his name is somewhat of a legend in northern Arizona, and many natural features bear his name. He died in Taylor, Arizona at the age of 90.

== See also ==
- Tanner Trail
- Grand Canyon
- Grand Canyon National Park
- List of trails in Grand Canyon National Park
