= Long Tom's treasure =

American folklore about the Grand Canyon

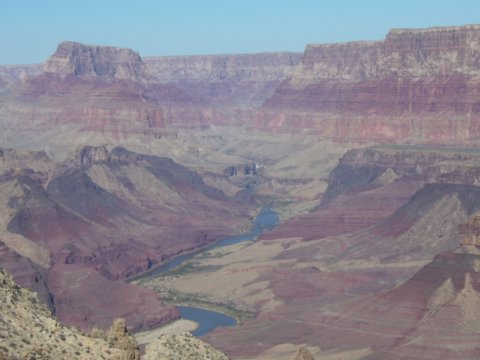
The Colorado River from Tanner Trail

Long Tom's treasure is a legend in American folklore said to have taken place in the Grand Canyon of Arizona, four miles west of the Tanner immigrant trail, near a Havasupai village.

In 1910, "Long Tom" Watson found papers in a cabin written by outlaws. The papers described a cache of stolen gold hidden behind a seasonal waterfall in the canyon. Beginning in 1912, Watson searched the area until spring of 1914 when he decided to give up. While returning home on Horse Thief Trail from Moran Point, Watson sighted a waterfall, after hiking to it he found a cave behind the water and entered it. Inside he discovered an unspecified amount of gold nuggets but as Watson was about to leave, he slipped, fell, and broke his leg. Leaving the gold behind, Long Tom Watson crawled his way to the nearby Buggeln Ranch. Watson later recovered from his injury and began a new search but he could not find the waterfall and ended up committing suicide.
