= Long Tom Commando =

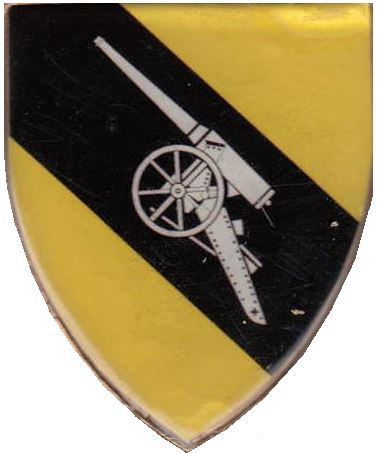
- Long Tom Commando emblem
- Country: South Africa
- Allegiance: Republic of South Africa; Republic of South Africa
- Branch: South African Army; South African Army
- Type: Infantry
- Role: Light Infantry
- Size: One Battalion
- Part of: South African Infantry Corps; Army Territorial Reserve, Group 33
- Garrison/HQ: Graskop

Long Tom Commando was a light infantry regiment of the South African Army. It formed part of the South African Army Infantry Formation as well as the South African Territorial Reserve.

== History ==
=== Origin ===
This commando was founded in the mid eighties in Graskop covering areas on the escarpment and Buschbuckridge. The units mascot was a Long Tom gun from the Anglo Boer War

=== Operations ===
==== With the SADF ====
During this era, the unit was mainly used for area force protection, search and cordones as well as stock theft control assistance to the rural police.

The unit resorted under the command of the SADF's Group 33.

==== With the SANDF ====
===== Disbandment =====
This unit, along with all other Commando units was disbanded after a decision by South African President Thabo Mbeki to disband all Commando Units. The Commando system was phased out between 2003 and 2008 "because of the role it played in the apartheid era", according to the Minister of Safety and Security Charles Nqakula.

=== Unit Insignia ===
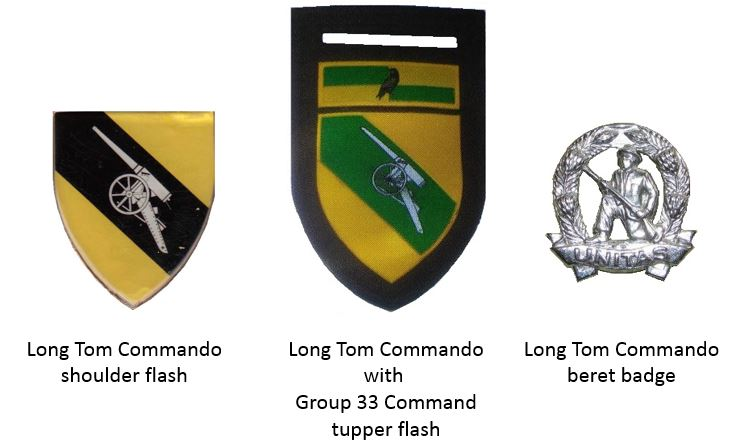
SADF era Long Tom Commando insignia

== See also ==
- South African Commando System
