= Best Available Retrofit Technology =

Best Available Retrofit Technology (BART) is a pollution control standard in the United States Clean Air Act.

== Overview ==
A BART review is required by sections 169A and 169B of the Clean Air Act for pollution sources which might cause haze in a "Federal Class 1 area". An example of such a source is the Navajo Generating Station in Page, Arizona which could affect visibility in Grand Canyon National Park. BART provisions were included in the "Clean Air Visibility Rule," published by the United States Environmental Protection Agency (EPA) in 1999, and amended in 2005.

== Determining best available retrofit technology ==
The Clean Air Act defines Best available retrofit technology:

... in determining best available retrofit technology the State (or the Administrator in determining emission limitations which reflect such technology) shall take into consideration the costs of compliance, the energy and nonair quality environmental impacts of compliance, any existing pollution control technology in use at the source, the remaining useful life of the source, and the degree of improvement in visibility which may reasonably be anticipated to result from the use of such technology;

== Navajo Generating Station ==
A BART review may take into account the interests of stakeholders associated with the source. In the case of Navajo Generating Station, EPA solicited input from stakeholders: the Department of the Interior, the Central Arizona Project, the Navajo Nation, the Gila River Indian Community, the Salt River Project, the Environmental Defense Fund, and Western Resources Advocates. A technical working group negotiated a "Reasonable Progress Alternative to BART" which was submitted by the Department of the Interior to the EPA on July 26, 2013 for consideration in development of a final rule. (The plant ceased commercial power generation in 2019.)

== External links and further reading ==
- Visibility and Regional Haze - EPA
  - Regional Planning Organizations - EPA
- "Regulatory Impact Analysis For The Final Clean Air Visibility Rule Or The Guidelines For Best Available Retrofit Technology (BART) Determinations Under The Regional Haze Regulations" (2005) - EPA
