= Navajo Generating Station =

Arizona, US, coal-fired power plant (1974–2019)

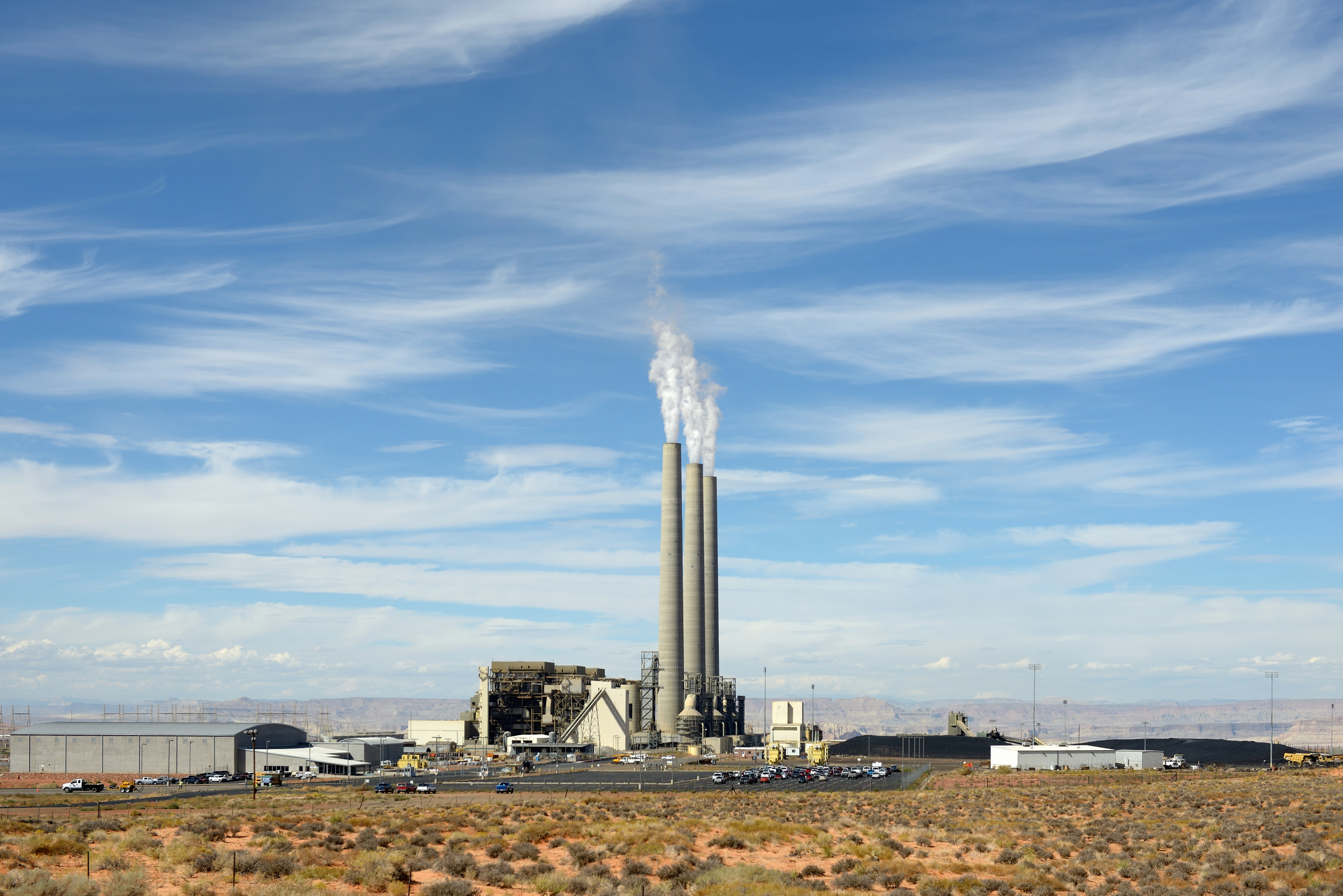
- Navajo Generating Station
- Country: United States
- Location: Navajo Nation, near Page, Arizona
- Coordinates: 36°54′12″N 111°23′25″W
- Status: Shut down
- Commission date: 1974 (operated 44 years); 1975 (operated 43 years); 1976 (operated 42 years)
- Decommission date: November 18, 2019
- Construction cost: $650 million (1976) ($2.86 billion in 2025 dollars)
- Owners: U.S. Bureau of Reclamation (24.3%); Salt River Project (21.7%); LADWP (former) (21.2%); Arizona Public Service (14.0%); NV Energy (11.3%); Tucson Electric Power (7.5%)
- Operator: Salt River Project

Thermal power station
- Primary fuel: Coal

Power generation
- Units decommissioned: 3 × 803 MW
- Nameplate capacity: 2,250 MW
- Annual net output: 12,059 GW·h (2016)

External links
- Commons: Related media on Commons

Navajo Generating Station was a 2.25-gigawatt (2,250 MW), coal-fired power plant located on the Navajo Nation, near Page, Arizona, United States. This plant provided electrical power to customers in Arizona, Nevada, and California. It also provided the power for pumping Colorado River water for the Central Arizona Project, supplying about 1.5 million acre-feet (1.9 km^{3}) of water annually to central and southern Arizona. As of 2017 permission to operate as a conventional coal-fired plant was anticipated until 2017–2019, and to December 22, 2044, if extended. However, in 2017, the utility operators of the power station voted to close the facility when the lease expires in 2019. In March 2019, the Navajo Nation ended efforts to buy the plant and continue running it after the lease expires.

On November 18, 2019, the plant ceased commercial generation. Full decommissioning of the site was projected to take approximately three years. On December 18, 2020, the three smokestacks were demolished.

== Post-shutdown ==
The shutdown of the plant in 2019 had an impact on the Navajo Nation and the Hopi tribes, as the plant provided revenue and employment to the tribes. The Kayenta Mine, which supplied the coal, also shut down. About 1000 jobs were lost and $40 million in Navajo Nation revenue was lost. The Hopi general fund dropped by an estimated 60 to 80 percent. Other plants in the general area also shut down, such as the San Juan Generating Station in 2022. Further south in Arizona, Cholla Power Plant was shut down in 2025.

The Inflation Reduction Act included provisions for assistance in electricity generation for the tribes, but these plans were put into limbo by the Trump administration in 2025 with the passing of the One Big Beautiful Bill Act, which had various effects on these types of projects.

As of 2025, the Navajo Nation remains involved in the coal industry via Navajo Transitional Energy Company (NTEC) which owns the Navajo Mine and Railroad (acquired in 2013), making it one of the largest producers of coal in the United States.

== History ==
In the 1950s and 1960s, there was a need for new electric generation in the Southwest to supply power to growing populations in southern California, Arizona and Nevada. The US Bureau of Reclamation also needed a large source of power for running the pumps of the planned Central Arizona Project (CAP).

A number of power projects were considered to fill these needs, including Bridge Canyon and Marble Canyon hydroelectric dams on the Colorado River. However, the proximity of the proposed dams to the Grand Canyon raised opposition, initially from the National Park Service and then more vigorously from a coalition of environmental groups which promoted construction of a thermal or nuclear power plant as an alternative. As a result, the proposed dams were abandoned in favor of the Navajo Power Project, consisting of the Navajo Generating Station (NGS) along with the Kayenta mine, Black Mesa & Lake Powell (BM&LP) Railroad, and 800 miles (1,300 km) of 500 kV transmission lines.

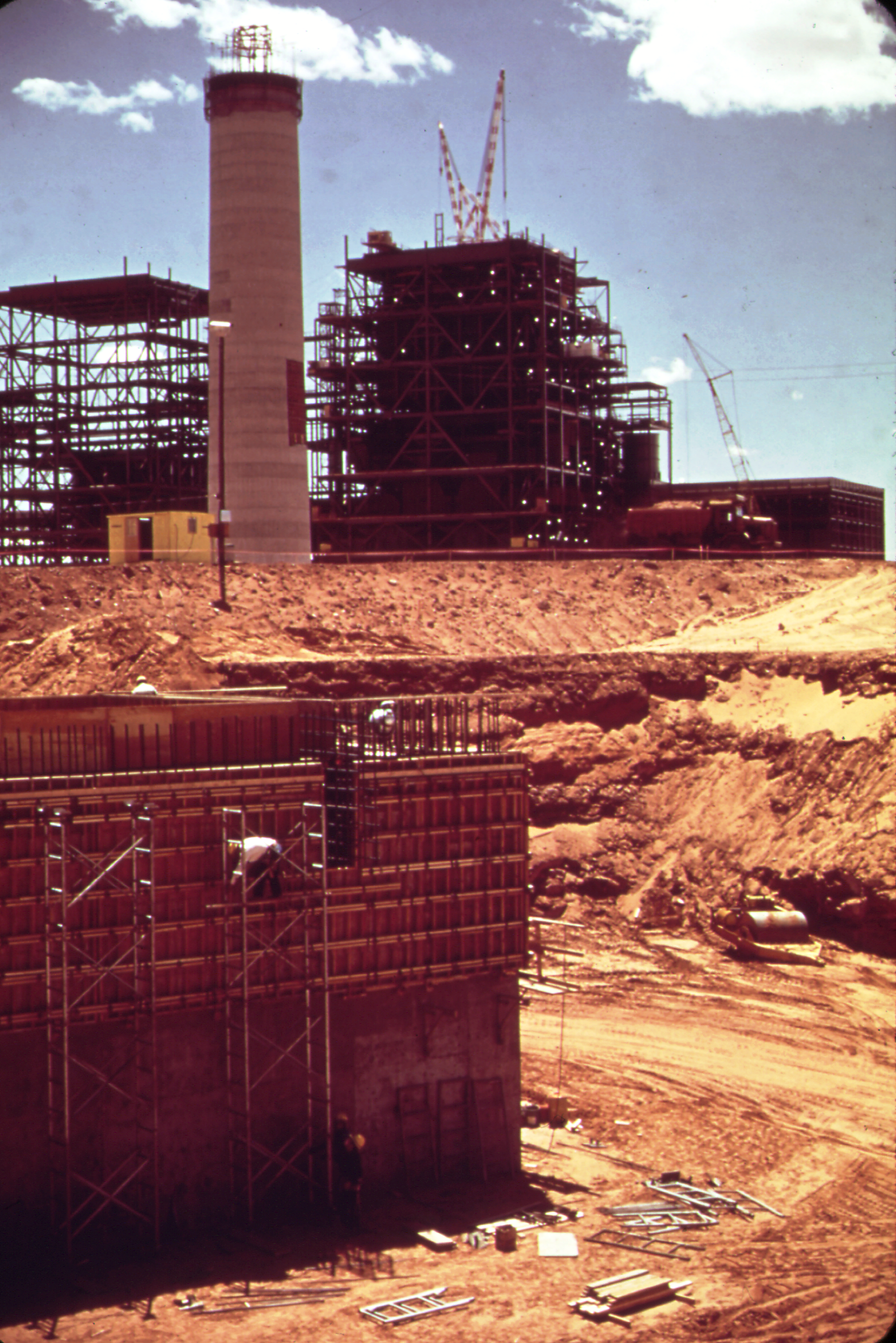
Railroad track hopper, boiler structures and stack during plant construction

The site selected for the new power plant was about six miles (9.7 km) east of Glen Canyon Dam and three miles (4.8 km) south of Lake Powell on 1,786 acres (723 ha) of land leased from the Navajo Nation. The site was close to a source of competitively priced fuel and a reliable source of surface water for cooling. The nearby city of Page and U.S. Highway 89 provided infrastructure to support construction and operation of the project. The contract for engineering and construction was awarded to Bechtel Corporation, which began construction in April, 1970. Generating units 1, 2, and 3 were completed in 1974, 1975, and 1976 respectively at a total cost of about $650 million.

Between 1977 and 1990, following Clean Air Act amendments for assessing and protecting visibility in national parks and wilderness areas, the EPA, Salt River Project and other entities cooperated in visibility studies to assess possible effects that NGS emissions might have on those areas.

The series of studies culminated in the Winter Haze Intensive Tracer Experiment (WHITEX) and the Navajo Generating Station Visibility Study (NGSVS). Those studies indicated that controlling sulfur dioxide (SO_{2}) emissions might improve winter visual range in the Grand Canyon by 2% to 7%, which prompted the EPA to propose a rule requiring NGS to reduce SO_{2} emissions by 70%.

NGS and environmental groups, however, negotiated an approach that would achieve a greater degree of improvement at lower cost. They agreed to, and recommended a requirement of a 90% reduction in SO_{2} emissions based on an annual average, with installation to be completed in 1999. The EPA accepted the recommendation and implemented those conditions in its final rule.

The technology selected for flue gas desulfurization (FGD) were wet SO_{2} scrubbers with forced oxidation. Stone & Webster, the architect-engineering firm for the scrubber project, began construction in 1994 and completed the work on Units 3, 2, and 1 in 1997, 1998, and 1999 respectively. The cost of the scrubber project was about $420 million.

During spring overhauls in 2003 through 2005, the electrostatic precipitators were completely gutted and rebuilt for reliability and optimum performance. The original collecting plates and weighted wire electrodes were replaced with improved collecting plates and rigid discharge electrodes. Control equipment was replaced with upgraded automatic voltage controls and rappers.

In 2007, an analysis of nitrogen oxide (NO_{x}) emissions and control options was conducted for SRP in support of Clean Air Act regional haze reduction efforts, although there were no (NO_{x}) reduction requirements on NGS at the time. The analysis concluded that Low NO_{x} burners with separated overfire air (SOFA) would provide the Best Available Retrofit Technology (BART) alternative in accordance with EPA BART guidelines. Consequently, the plant voluntarily installed low NO_{x}-SOFA burners on units 3, 2, and 1 during eight-week outages in February through March 2009, 2010, and 2011 respectively.

The Los Angeles Department of Water and Power withdrew from the project in 2016. After the rise of shale gas in the United States, natural gas power prices ($32/MWh) fell under the cost of coal power for NGS ($38/MWh), and NGS production decreased. The owners require a potential new owner (such as the Navajo Nation) to assume responsibility of future cleanups.

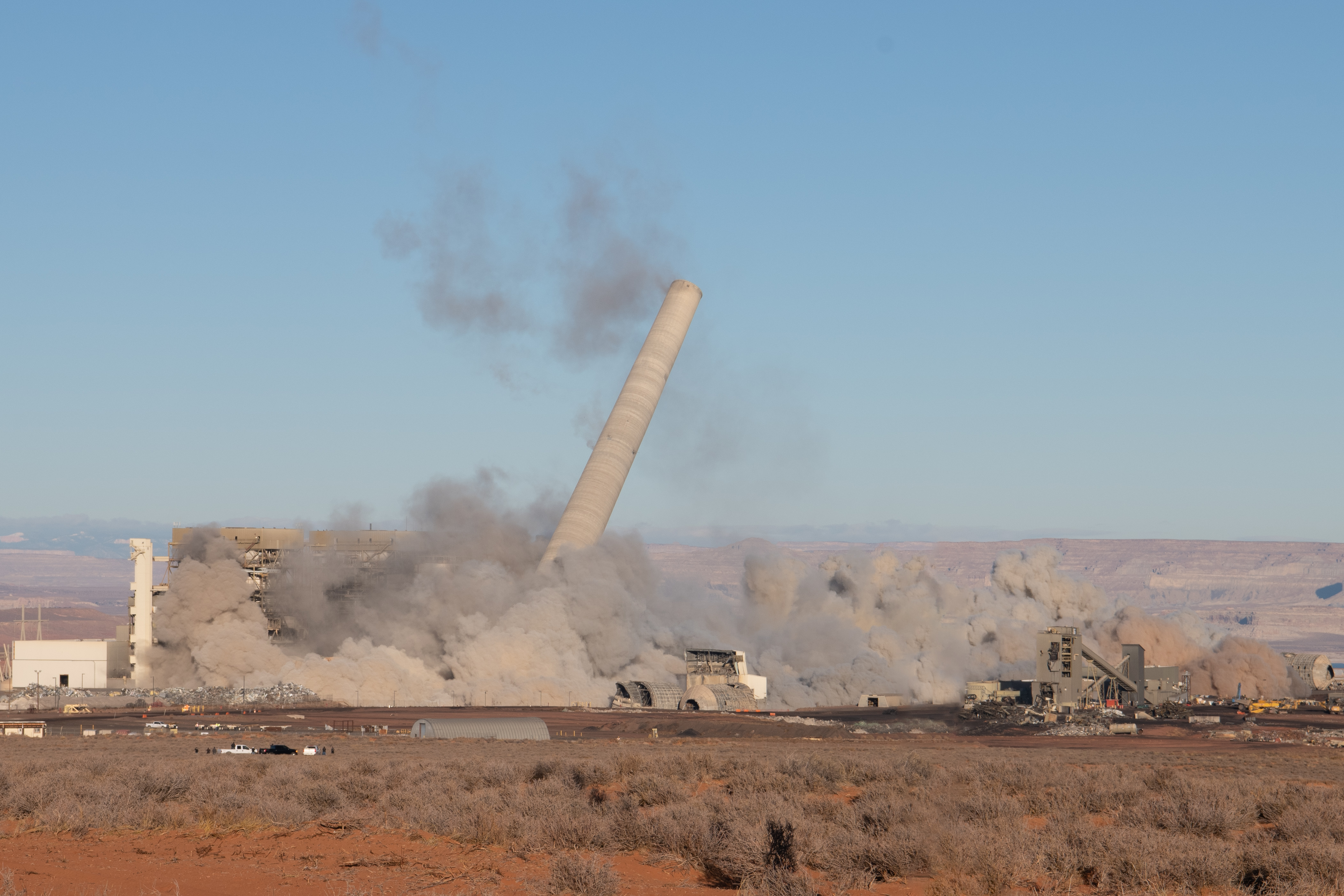
Demolition of Navajo Generating Station, December 2020

=== Design and specifications ===
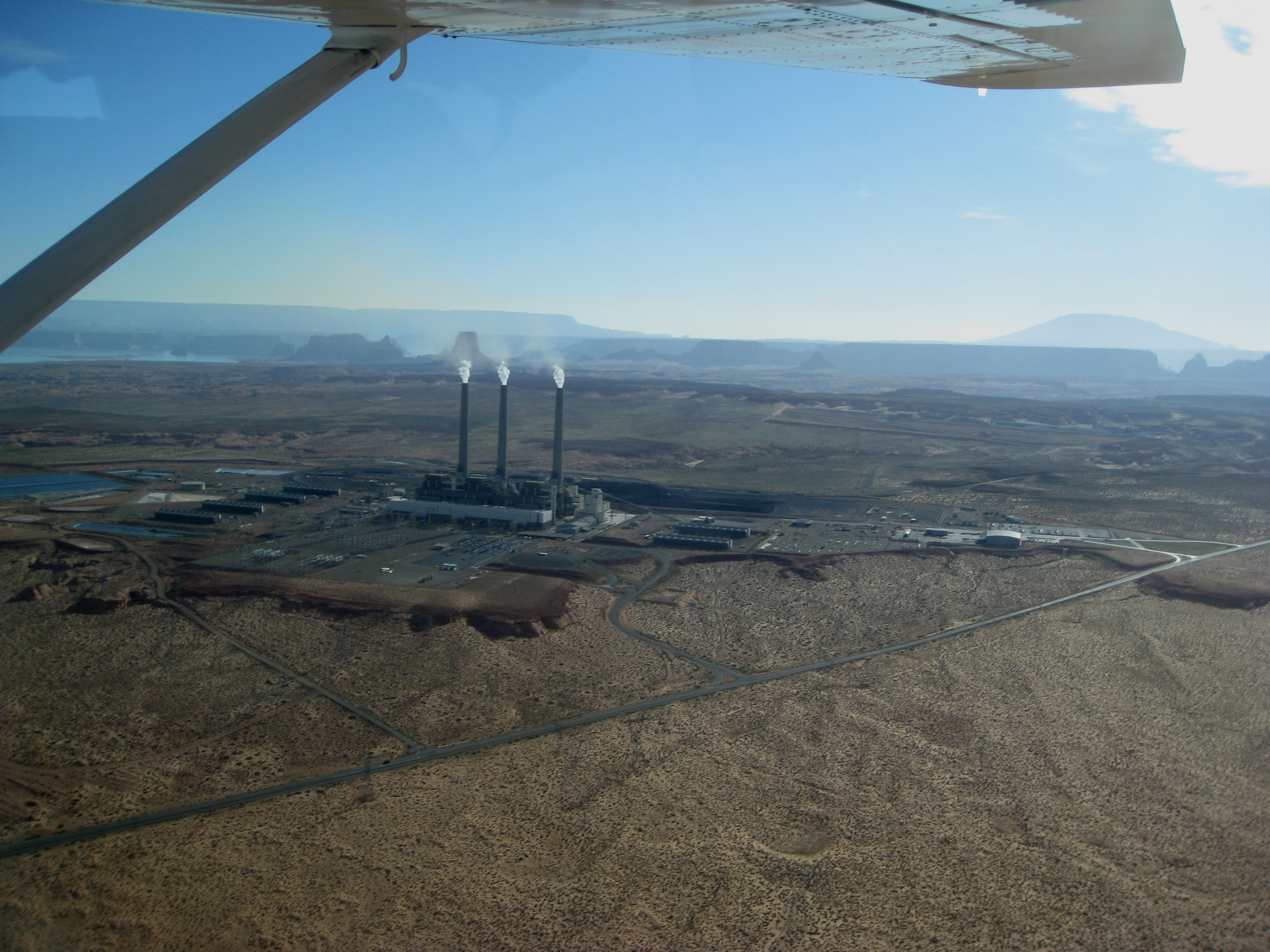
Aerial view of the plant

The plant had three identical 750 MW steam electric generating units. Major components of each unit included a boiler, turbine, generator, closed-cycle cooling system, and environmental control equipment.

The boilers were tangentially fired, balanced draft, reheat type steam generators, supplied by Combustion Engineering. Designed for supercritical operation, each boiler supplied up 5,410,000 pounds of steam per hour to the turbines at 3500 psi (241 bar) and 1,000 °F (538 °C).

The main turbines are General Electric (GE) tandem compound reheat turbines, each directly coupled to a generator and designed to rotate at 3600 rpm.

Steam discharged from the turbines entered a condenser where water circulating through tubes cools and condensed it, producing a vacuum that maximized the pressure drop across the turbine. The heat picked up by the circulating water was removed by evaporation in six induced-draft cross flow cooling towers (two per unit). The plant used about 26,000 acre-feet (32,000,000 m^{3}) of water per year from Lake Powell, or about 1/2 gallon (1.9L) per kWh, mainly for cooling water and scrubber operation; see section #Wastewater handling.

The plant consumed about 8 million tons of low sulfur bituminous coal each year, supplied by Peabody Energy's Kayenta Mine near Kayenta, Arizona. The coal was hauled 75 miles from mine silos to the plant by the Black Mesa and Lake Powell Railroad that is owned and operated by the plant. Characteristics of the coal in 2011 included a sulfur content of 0.64%, an ash content of 10.6%, and higher heating value (HHV) of 10,774 Btu/lb.

The plant had three 775 ft (236 meters) tall flue gas stacks, listed among the tallest structures in Arizona. The stacks were constructed of reinforced concrete, supporting an internal metal liner. The plant's original stacks were demolished in the late 1990s after being replaced by larger diameter stacks of the same height, resulting in the plant having up to six stacks visible for a time.

The new stacks were required to accommodate cooler flue gas saturated with water vapor that resulted when wet SO_{2} scrubbers were added.

=== Performance ===
The plant had a net nameplate capacity of 2250 MW or 750 MW net per unit, the rated power output leaving the plant through the transmission lines. The gross capacity was 2409.3 MW or 803.1 MW per unit, the rated power output at the generator that includes power used internally in the operation of the plant.

Annual net energy generation in 2011 was 16.9 terawatt-hours (TWh), with a net capacity factor of 86%. Annual gross generation was 18.3 TWh. Fuel consumed (primary energy) in 2011 provided 50.0 TWh (170.5×10^{12} Btu) of heat input, resulting in a net heat rate of 34% or 2.95 kWh/kWh (10,060 Btu/kWh).

In 2014, generation fell to 72% of capacity, and to 61% in 2016. In the first 11 months of 2016, the plant consumed 32.7 TWh (111.6×10^{12} Btu) and produced 10.7 TWh of power, giving 33% efficiency.

=== Environmental controls ===
==== Flue gas emissions ====
Fly ash particulate was removed from the flue gas by hot-side electrostatic precipitators (ESPs) and SO_{2} scrubbers. The ESPs, constructed as part of the original plant, removed 99% of particulate. Scrubbers removed an additional 50% of what remained in the flue gas after passing through the ESPs.

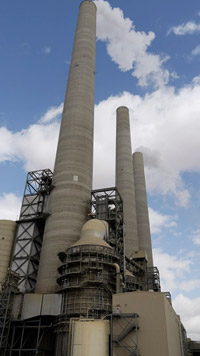
Scrubber absorber vessel and flue gas stacks

Sulfur dioxide (SO_{2}) emissions were controlled by forced oxidation wet scrubbers. The scrubbers consisted of two countercurrent–flow absorber vessels on each unit, using limestone slurry sprays to remove more than 92% of SO_{2} from the flue gas. The three scrubbers in total consumed about 24 MW of power, and used 130,000 tons of limestone and 3,000 acre-feet (3,700,000 m^{3}) of water per year, producing 200,000 tons of gypsum per year.

Prior to installation of the scrubbers, SO_{2} emissions were about 71,000 tons per year.

Nitrogen oxide emissions were controlled in the combustion process by the use of low-NO_{x} SOFA burners. Prior to 2009 when installation of the new burners began, NOx emissions were about 34,000 tons per year. The new burners reduced NO_{x} emissions by about 14,000 tons per year, or more than 40%.

Fine particulate measuring 2.5 micrometers or less (PM2.5), of concern for its potential effect on health and visibility, primarily results from reactions of SO_{2} and NO_{x} in the atmosphere to form sulfate and nitrate aerosols. NGS combined permit limits for these precursors has been 0.34 pounds per million British thermal units (0.53 kg/MWh), lower than 94% of all U.S. coal steam units, while the actual NGS rate in 2011 was 0.29 pounds per million British thermal units (0.45 kg/MWh).

Carbon dioxide (CO_{2}) emissions from NGS were seventh highest of all U.S. facilities in 2015, largely a result of the amount of energy it produced. In the same year, however, its CO_{2} emissions per unit of energy generated were lower than 75% of all U.S. coal-fired power plants. The plant's low CO_{2} emissions per electric output, compared to other coal-fired plants, were attributable to a relatively low heat rate combined with exclusive use of bituminous coal, which creates less CO_{2} per heat output than other types of coal.

Mercury emissions in 2011 were 586 pounds (266 kg) or 3.4 pounds per 10^{12} Btu (5.3 kg/TWh).

Emissions (2011)
| Component | Rate (lb/million Btu) | Rate (lb/MWh) | Annual plant total (short tons/year) |
| SO_{2} | 0.054 | 0.548 | 4,641 |
| NO_{x} | 0.233 | 2.340 | 19,837 |
| CO_{2e} | 219 | 2,201 | 18,660,820 |

==== Air quality effects ====
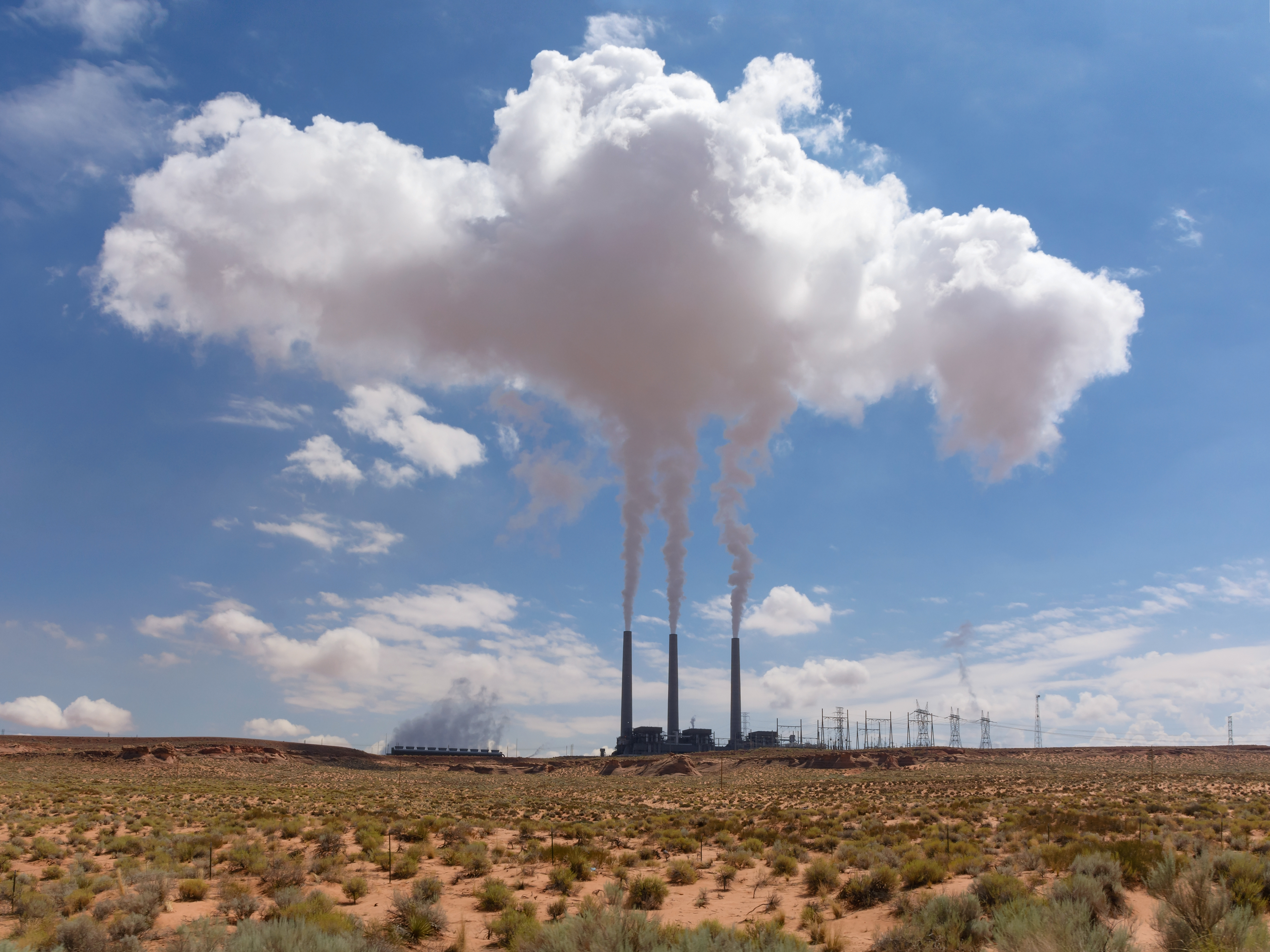
Navajo Generating Station vapor emissions

Northern Arizona and the Colorado Plateau have consistently met National Ambient Air Quality Standards (NAAQS) established to protect public health.

The EPA's Air Quality Index (AQI), showing air quality on a daily basis, lists no unhealthy days for the general population in all of northern Arizona and southern Utah counties. Unhealthy days for ozone-sensitive groups – those with asthma or lung disease – are also rare in these counties despite high natural background levels in the Intermountain West. Coconino County, with the highest occurrences, averages less than two unhealthy days per year, these occurring between March and June, suggesting a correlation with spring stratospheric ozone intrusions. NGS emissions are unlikely to have contributed to high ozone occurrences, as the plant is located at the northern border of Coconino County, and prevailing southwesterly winds in the spring blow toward counties to the north and east, which have not reported any days with unhealthy ozone levels. Moreover, Coconino County's two ozone monitoring sites – Grand Canyon Hance Camp and Page – show significant differences within the county (the sites being 70 miles apart). During periods when ozone readings have been highest, peak concentrations in Page were noted to be more than 10 percent lower than those at the Grand Canyon.

Nitrogen dioxide (NO_{2}) levels in the Page area average about 3 ppb, 94 percent lower than the NAAQS standard of 53 ppb. Carbon monoxide (CO) levels have also been far below the standards.

Fine particulate (PM2.5) levels in the Grand Canyon region have been among the lowest in the nation since before NGS completed installation of SO_{2} scrubbers and low NO_{x}-SOFA burners. Annual mean levels for PM2.5 in the Page area are about 3 micrograms/cubic meter (μg/m^{3}) – one-quarter of the NAAQS standard of 12 μg/m^{3} and as low or lower than the cleanest U.S. cities listed by the World Health Organization.

Visibility in the Grand Canyon region has also been among the best in the nation since before NGS installed scrubbers and low NO_{x}-SOFA burners. Within Coconino County, visibility is generally better in the Page/Glen Canyon area at the north end of the county than at the Grand Canyon and areas further south (Sunset Crater, Walnut Canyon, Wupatki National Monuments). Visibility in the Page/Glen Canyon area averages 3.5 deciviews above natural background conditions, within less than one deciview of the best visibility listed in the contiguous U.S. (The DV scale is near zero for a pristine atmosphere, with a change of one deciview being a just noticeable change.)

In 2012, a fish consumption advisory was issued for striped bass in lower Lake Powell, raising concerns about mercury emissions from the plant. NGS emissions, however, were found to contribute less than 2% of atmospheric deposition of mercury on the Colorado River watershed. Atmospheric deposition, furthermore, accounts for only a part of the mercury loading, much of it coming from natural geological deposits. The natural weathering of rock in the Green River catchment, for example, alone contributes about 40% of the mercury loading in Lake Powell.

==== Emissions requirements ====
The EPA's Mercury and Air Toxics Standard (MATS), slated to take effect in 2015, require that the plant reduce mercury emissions to 1.2 pounds per 10^{12} Btu (1.9 kg/TWh) or 0.013 pounds per gigawatt-hour (5.9 kg/TWh) on a gross basis.

On January 4, 2013, Department of the Interior, the EPA, and Department of Energy announced plans to jointly develop a plan for the future of the plant that maintains its energy, water, and economic benefits. The plan would outline short-term investments in the plant to meet environmental goals, and long-term plans for transitioning to cleaner energy options, such that short term and long-term plans work together.

On January 17, 2013, the EPA proposed a BART ruling to further reduce NO_{x} emissions:

The Environmental Protection Agency (EPA) is proposing a source-specific federal implementation plan (FIP) requiring the Navajo Generating Station (NGS), located on the Navajo Nation, to reduce emissions of oxides of nitrogen (NO X) under the Best Available Retrofit Technology (BART) provision of the Clean Air Act (CAA or Act) in order to reduce visibility impairment resulting from NGS at 11 National Parks and Wilderness Areas. NGS, which was built over 35 years ago, is the largest coal-fired power plant in the West in terms of generating capacity. It is central to the economies of the Navajo Nation and Hopi Tribe and supplies power to the states of Arizona, Nevada, and California. Electricity produced by NGS is also used to power the Central Arizona Project, which supplies surface water to three counties and numerous Indian tribes in Arizona. NGS is projected to continue operating at least until 2044. EPA is proposing to require NGS to achieve a nearly 80 percent reduction of its current overall NO X emission rate. Our analysis indicates that installation of controls to achieve this reduction would result in significant visibility improvement that is well-balanced with the cost of those controls. For a number of reasons, including the importance of NGS to numerous Indian tribes located in Arizona and the federal government's reliance on NGS to meet the requirements of water settlements with several tribes, EPA is proposing an alternative to BART that would provide flexibility to NGS in the schedule for the installation of new control equipment. We also describe other compliance schedules for consideration and comment. We recognize that there may be other approaches that could result in equivalent or better visibility benefits over time and that there may be changes in energy demand, supply or other developments over the next several decades that may change electricity generation on the Navajo Nation. EPA encourages a robust public discussion of our proposed BART determination and alternative, the additional alternatives described herein, and other possible approaches. EPA is prepared to issue a supplemental proposal if approaches other than the proposed BART determination or proposed alternative articulated in this notice are identified as satisfying the requirements of the Clean Air Act and meeting the needs of the stakeholders. EPA is committed to continuing to engage with stakeholders to develop a final FIP that maintains benefits to tribes and the regional economy while improving visibility in many of our nation's most treasured National Parks and Wilderness Areas.

The ruling would require the plant to reduce NO_{x} emissions to no more than 0.055 pounds per million British thermal units (85 g/MWh) by 2023, necessitating the installation of Selective Catalytic Reduction (SCR) equipment. The SCRs would need to reduce NO_{x} by about 15,000 tons per year. Along with the existing Low-NO_{x} burners, the total reduction would be about 29,000 tons per year below 2008 levels.

The SCRs would use a catalyst and ammonia to react with NO_{x} to form diatomic nitrogen and water. SCRs would also increase sulfuric acid mist levels by causing SO_{2} to oxidize to SO_{3}. The high sulfuric acid levels could require dry sorbent injection (DSI) – a system that injects a powdered sorbent such as trona to absorb the acid mist - and the addition of baghouses and booster fans to capture the resulting particulate.

SCRs without baghouses are expected to cost about $600 million to construct and about $12 million per year to operate and maintain. SCRs with baghouses would cost about $1.1 billion to construct and about $20 million per year to operate and maintain.

The SCRs by themselves would need about 15 MW to operate, requiring the burning of an additional 50,000 tons of coal per year and increasing CO_{2} emissions by 125,000 tons per year. If baghouses are also needed, the systems would need about 30 MW to operate, requiring an additional 100,000 tons of coal per year and increasing CO_{2} emissions by 250,000 tons per year. The operation would also consume some 40,000 pounds of anhydrous ammonia daily.

The plant faced a number of hurdles to retrofitting SCRs in the allotted time. Before the plant's owners could invest in SCRs, they will have to resolve the site lease, rights-of-way for the railroad, transmission and water lines, and the coal supply agreement. One participant – LADWP – cannot invest in the improvements due to California law prohibiting long-term investment in coal-fired power plants, and plans to sell its share in the plant by 2015.

NV Energy announced it also intends to pull out of participation in the plant, planning to divest its interest by 2019. Extension of the plantsite lease with the Navajo Nation requires the approval of the Secretary of the Interior, who cannot approve it until environmental assessments required by the National Environmental Policy Act (NEPA) and the Endangered Species Act (ESA) are completed. The current lease expired in 2019 and the environmental assessments are expected to take about five years to complete.

After the EPA issued a proposed BART rule it solicited input from stakeholders: the Department of the Interior, the Central Arizona Project, the Navajo Nation, the Gila River Indian Community, the Salt River Project, the Environmental Defense Fund, and Western Resources Advocates who as a technical working group negotiated a "Reasonable Progress Alternative to BART" which was submitted by the Department of the Interior to the EPA on July 26, 2013, for consideration in development of a final rule:

The Parties shall submit this Agreement to EPA and request that EPA: adopt the Reasonable Progress Alternative to BART set forth in Appendix B as the Final BART Rule;

The agreement contains a commitment by the current owners of NGS to cease their operation of conventional coal-fired generation at NGS no later than December 22, 2044.

==== Wastewater handling ====
NGS was built with one of the first zero liquid discharge (ZLD) systems in a power plant, recovering all cooling tower blow-down and runoff from developed areas of the site. The waste water is processed through three brine concentrators and a crystallizer, which remove the solids and produce distilled water for re-use within the plant. Several lined ponds are used in conjunction with the ZLD system to capture and regulate the flow of waste water to the system.

==== Byproducts handling ====
The plant sold about 500,000 tons of fly ash per year for use in the manufacture of concrete and Flexcrete insulating block building product. Bottom ash and gypsum, a byproduct of the scrubber operation, are dewatered in the removal process; and, along with any fly ash not sold, were landfilled on-site as solids.

The plant's ash handling contract required the landfilled ash be covered with a minimum of two feet of native soil cover at closure, and be contoured to contain a 100-year storm runoff event to prevent erosion, although the original lease had only specified covering it with six inches of native soil.

=== Economic aspects ===
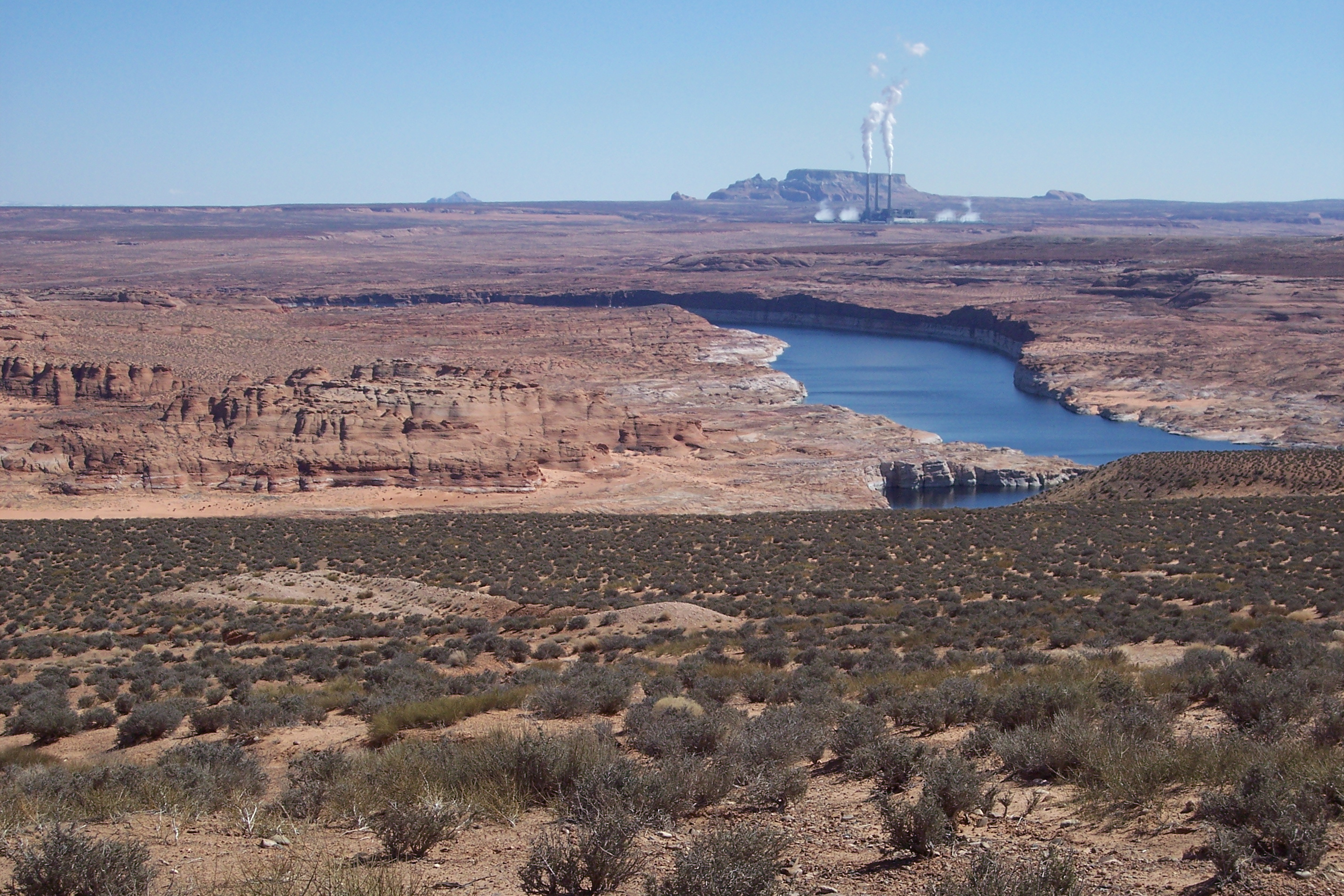
Lake Powell, Page city area on the right and Navajo generating station in the background

Economic benefits of the plant resulted from NGS wages and site leases, as well as Kayenta Mine wages and royalties that result from NGS coal purchases, NGS being the sole source of revenue for the mine. The plant and mine annually pay out about $100 million in direct wages and $50 million in leases and royalties.

The majority owners of the NGS did not plan to keep the plant running past 2019, because natural-gas-fired electricity is a cheaper nationwide trend. The Navajo Nation has petitioned the federal government to keep the plant open and preserve Navajo jobs. This would likely require relaxation of emissions standards and/or direct subsidy.

==== Plant employment, leases, and payments ====
NGS had 538 employees, and paid about $52 million per year in total wages.

The 1,786 acres for the plant site is leased from the Navajo Nation.

Rights-of-way and easements on tribal lands, permitted under a 25 U.S.C. §323 grant, include the plant site, 78 miles of railroad right-of-way covering 1,309 acres, and 96 miles of transmission line right-of-way covering 3,850 acres.

Annual lease payments to the Navajo Nation were $608,000 as of 2012.

Air permit fees paid to the Navajo Nation EPA were about $400,000 per year.

Property taxes paid to the State of Arizona were about $4.8 million per year. Since 2011, payments in lieu of taxes have also been paid to the Navajo Nation at half the Arizona tax rate, or about $2.4 million per year.

==== Lease extension ====
Plant owners and the Navajo Nation negotiated terms for a 25-year extension to the original lease that ended in December 2019. Proposed lease payments under the extended lease would increase to $9 million per year beginning in 2020. The terms also include 'Additional Payments' in lieu of taxes and other compensation, starting at $10 million per year following approval by the tribe and escalating to $34 million in 2020, although prorated if one or more units are retired or permanently de-rated. Payment terms, stated in 2011 dollars, would be adjusted annually based on the consumer price index (CPI). Due to CPI adjustments, actual payments by 2020 had been projected to be around $52 million/year. As of 2013 permission to operate as a conventional coal-fired plant was anticipated until December 22, 2044. Because the new lease was not approved, the station would shut down by the end of 2017 if decommissioning is to be finished by original lease end in 2019.

==== Mine employment and royalties ====
The Kayenta mine has 430 employees, and pays about $47 million per year in total wages.

Coal royalties are paid at 12.5% of gross proceeds, as on federal BLM lands. The royalties and other mine payments amount to about $50 million per year, $37 million paid to the Navajo Nation and $13 million to the Hopi tribe.

==== Impact on regional economies ====
NGS and Kayenta Mine payments in 2012 accounted for about a quarter of the Navajo Nation's revenues, and 65% of the Hopi Tribe's revenues. Native American tribal members, mainly Navajo, make up 83% of plant employees and 93% of mine employees, resulting in about 850 direct tribal positions.

Indirectly, plant and mine operations support the equivalent of about 1,600 full-time positions. With increased lease and royalty payments, by 2020 the plant and mine had been expected to generate more than 2,100 indirect jobs for the Navajo Nation alone, if all three units continued running.

The cumulative economic impact on the state of Arizona as a whole for the time period 2011–2044 was expected to be $20 billion in gross state product, or about $330 million per year in disposable income and $20 million per year in state tax revenues, also assuming all three units continued running.

Regional effects of installing SCR and baghouses would include increasing CAP water rates by as much as 32% for agricultural users and Indian tribes. If the plant were to shut down, those rates were expected to increase as much as 66%.

In 2012, NGS and the Navajo Tribal Utility Authority (NTUA) formed a partnership to extend electrical power to 62 homes in the area surrounding the nearby community of LeChee. Since NGS participants have no jurisdiction for supplying electricity on the reservation (that authority belonging solely to the NTUA), NGS and the NTUA would jointly fund the project, and the NTUA would build it.

==== Water service contract ====
Water used by the plant is supplied from Arizona's annual allocation of 50,000 acre-feet of upper basin Colorado River water through Water Service Contract No. 14-06-400-5003 with the U.S. Bureau of Reclamation and Arizona Department of Water Resources permit A-3224.

Water payment rate had been $7 an acre-foot, resulting in payments to the U.S. of about $180,000 per year.Payments were set to increase to $90 an acre-foot in 2014, or about $2.4 million per year. By comparison, water rates and leases in the Four Corners region are typically $40 to $155 per acre-foot.

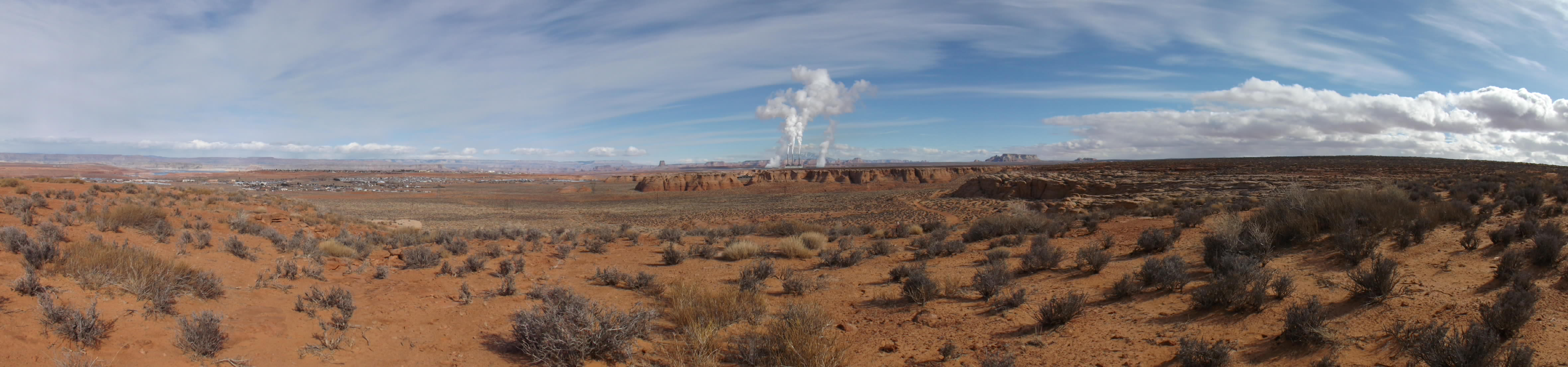
Winter panorama showing the city of Page, the Navajo Generating Station, and LeChee Rock (left to right, looking east near center). Water vapor from the plant's stacks and cooling towers forms a large plume due to the cold air and relative humidity.

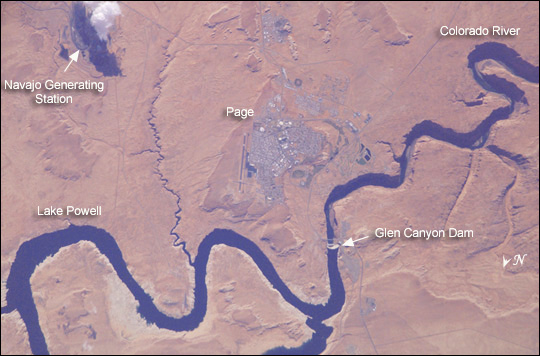
Satellite photo showing Page, Lake Powell, Glen Canyon Dam, Navajo Generating Station and Colorado River (North towards bottom, see arrow at lower right)

==== Production ====
Navajo Generating Station's production was as follows.

| Year | GW·h |
|---|---|
| 2011 | 16,952 |
| 2012 | 15,888 |
| 2013 | 17,132 |
| 2014 | 17,297 |
| 2015 | 13,573 |
| 2016 | 12,059 |
| 2017 | 13,781 |
| 2018 | 13,017 |

== Popular culture ==
Navajo Generating Station featured extensively in one of the sequences in the 1982 film Koyaanisqatsi. The Navajo Generating Station is featured in Edward Abbey's book The Monkey Wrench Gang

== See also ==
- List of largest power stations in the United States
