= Kayenta Mine =

Arizona coal mine (1973–2019)

Kayenta mine
- Location within Arizona
- Location: Navajo Nation, US, Arizona, United States; 36°31′36″N 110°25′52″W
- Opened: 1973
- Closed: 2019
- Company: Peabody Energy
- Website: http://www.peabodyenergy.com

The Kayenta mine was a surface coal mine operated by Peabody Western Coal Company, a subsidiary of Peabody Energy) on the Navajo Nation in northern Arizona from 1973 to 2019. About 400 acres were mined and reclaimed each year, providing about 8 million tons of coal annually to the Navajo Generating Station.

== History ==
The Kayenta mine was located near the northern edge of Black Mesa, a 5,400 square mile highland plateau in northeast Arizona that contains extensive coal deposits in several geologic formations.

Since about 1300 AD, the Hopi had extracted coal from the area for pottery firing and domestic heating. In the early 1900s, limited surveying of the coal field was made and a number of small underground mines were put into production, supplying local reservation schools and communities in the region.

The coal field received increased attention beginning in 1950 when the Navajo-Hopi Long Range Rehabilitation Act was enacted in response to dire economic conditions on the reservations. The Act intended to promote economic development and better utilization of the reservations’ natural resources. As a result, the strata and coal deposits of Black Mesa were more extensively studied; and in 1961 and 1964 Sentry Royalty Company, a subsidiary of Peabody Coal Company, was issued drilling and exploration permits on the Mesa to determine areas where coal could be economically recovered.

In 1964 and 1966, Sentry entered into mining lease agreements with the tribes for 64,848 acres. The first lease was made in 1964 for 24,858 acres of land held exclusively by the Navajo Tribe, designated Navajo Coal Lease No. 14-20-0603-8580, or N-8580 for short. The additional 40,000 acres were leased in 1966 in the Navajo-Hopi Joint Use Area, leases being entered into with each of the two tribes – Joint Mineral Lease No. 14-20-0450-5743, a.k.a. J-5743, with the Hopi tribe, and 14-20-0603-9910, a.k.a. J-9910, with the Navajo Tribe. When the Joint Use Area was later partitioned between the tribes in 1974, much of the mine lease area and surface rights ended up with Navajo Nation, but the two tribes retained joint and equal interest in the coal and other minerals under the partitioned lands.

Peabody developed two separate mines within the leasehold area – the Black Mesa mine and Kayenta mine. The Black Mesa mine, located on 20,775 acres in the southwestern section of the leasehold area, began operation in 1970 supplying the Mohave Generating Station in Laughlin, Nevada via a pipeline. The Kayenta mine, on 44,073 acres in the northern and eastern sections, began operation in 1973 supplying the Navajo Generating Station near Page, Arizona.

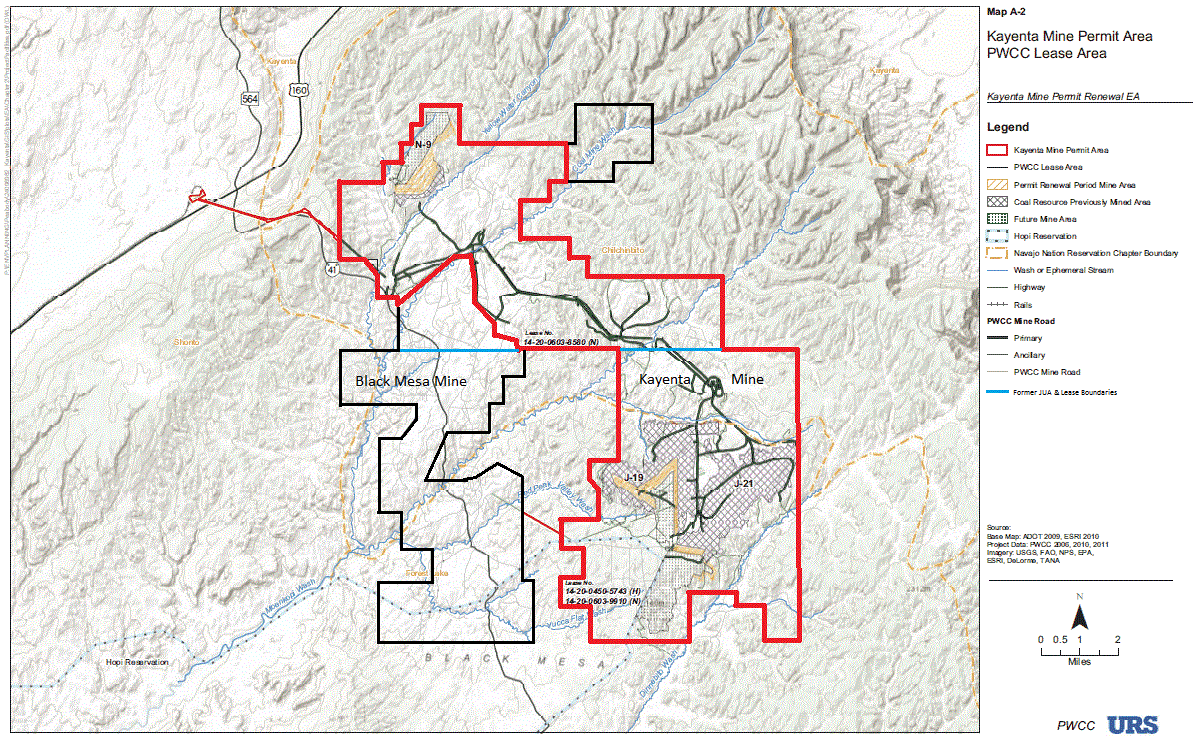
Mine complex leasehold area

Mine locations were set relative to conveying transfer points, natural divisions between recoverable sections of coal (called coal resource areas), and projected quantities to be supplied to the respective power plants, such that each mine had portions on both the Navajo Reservation and in the Joint Use Area. The leased areas, mines, and facilities were collectively termed the Black Mesa Complex.

In 1982, the U.S. Office of Surface Mining Reclamation and Enforcement (OSM) issued permit AZ-0001 for surface mining and reclamation operations on the Black Mesa and Kayenta mines. The permit was most recently renewed in 2012 for the Kayenta Mine as permit No. AZ-0001E.

In 2005, the Black Mesa Mine ceased production when the Mohave Generating Station was shut down, leaving the Kayenta Mine as the only active mine in the leasehold area.

As of June, 2019, the mine staff was being reduced in anticipation of the closure of the Navajo Generating Station. The mine delivered its last load of coal to the station in August 2019, and the station closed in November 2019. The closures reduced the Hopi budget by $12 million, or 80% of the total budget.

== Coal characteristics ==
The coal that is mined comes from the Wepo formation, the uppermost coal-bearing formation on the Mesa, and is removed from multiple seams that are typically 3 to 15 feet thick and lie within about 130 feet of the surface.

It is classified as low-sulfur, high volatile C bituminous, having a heat content of 10,820 Btu/lb, ash content of 10.4%, and sulfur content of 0.63%. Average mercury content is 0.04 ppm, or about 4 lb/trillion Btu, a concentration that is about 1/10th that of average shale rock and among the lowest concentrations in US coals.

== Operation ==
Coal is removed by the open cut or strip mining method. Topsoil is first removed and placed on previously mined and re-contoured areas or stored separately for later reclamation. Overburden is then blasted to loosen the materials and is removed primarily by electric dragline to expose the coal seams. Excavators, loaders and haul trucks then remove the exposed coal to a collection point, where it is crushed and loaded on a 17-mile-long (27 km) overland belt conveyor.

The conveyor carries the coal to rail load-out silos, where the coal is loaded into BM&LP rail cars bound for the Navajo Generating Station.

Areas disturbed by mine activities cover less than half of the leasehold area, and traditional land use and occupancy are allowed to continue within the leased area where safely removed from active mining operations. As of 2010, approximately 83 households were located within the leasehold area, four of them in an area planned for future mining operations. For those households that must be moved, Peabody provides for relocation to an agreed-upon area within or adjacent to the leasehold area, as well as compensation for acreage removed from customary grazing as a result of mining activities.

== Environmental controls and impacts ==
=== Archaeology ===
From 1967 to 1986, one of the largest and longest-running archaeological projects in North America, the Black Mesa Archaeological Project, was conducted with the assistance of Peabody Coal Company to record, preserve or relocate archaeological artifacts within the leasehold area. Since 1986, Peabody has continued archaeological testing and mitigation ahead of mine activities. Mining operations have also been adjusted to avoid a number of locations identified as sacred or ceremonial sites.

=== Air quality ===
Measures to protect air quality include water sprays and sprinklers to control dust on dirt roads and disturbed areas, enclosures and water sprays at belt conveyor transfer points, baghouses on coal storage silos, and other requirements of the mine's Clean Air Act operating permit NN-OP 08-010. The permit is administered, monitored and enforced by the Navajo Nation Environmental Protection Agency (NNEPA), as authorized by the US EPA. Peabody maintains a network of PM10 particulate monitors to assess the effectiveness of fugitive dust control measures and ensure compliance with national ambient air quality standards (NAAQS). Monitoring data are reported quarterly to the OSM and NNEPA.

=== Water resources ===
Two main washes – Moenkopi Wash and Dinnebito Wash – pass through the mine permit area and eventually run into the Little Colorado River. Although mining does not occur in these washes, storm water runoff from areas disturbed by mining activities could potentially degrade the quality of water going into them. To prevent degradation of surface waters, sedimentation ponds are constructed under the mine's surface water protection program. Water quality is monitored and controlled at these ponds, as well as at livestock watering ponds, seeps and storm water runoff. The program is regulated through the US EPA's National Pollutant Discharge Elimination System under NPDES permit No. NN0022179, and Multi-Sector General Permit No. AZR05000I.

The mine pumps about 1,240 acre-feet (1.5 million cubic meters) of ground water per year from the Navajo aquifer (a.k.a. N-aquifer). The water is used primarily for dust control, with about 60 acre-feet (74,000 m^{3}) made available to area residents. Up until December 2005, the Black Mesa mine had used ground water to slurry coal through a 273-mile-long (439 km) pipeline to the Mohave Generating Station. Until the station was shut down, the combined water usage by both mines had been 4,450 acre⋅ft (5.5 million m^{3}) per year.

== Reclamation of mined lands ==
Once a section has been mined out, it is backfilled and graded to the approximate previous contour and topped with suitable spoil, subsoil, and topsoil to create a four-foot-thick root zone. The land is then seeded and restored for grazing, wildlife habitat, and cultural plant cultivation. Replanted areas are monitored for a minimum of 10 years to correct any erosion problems, control invasive weeds, and insure the plant systems are fully established before being released for grazing.

As of 2012, more than 15,000 acres had been restored on the Black Mesa Complex and 39 permanent ponds had been created for livestock watering and wildlife habitat.

Reclamation efforts were recognized by the U.S. Office of Surface Mining for reclamation excellence in 1998; for cultural, historic and archaeological preservation in 2002; good neighbor award in 2003, and reclamation excellence and good neighbor awards in 2005.

== See also ==
- Black Mesa Peabody Coal controversy
