= Coal pipeline =

Coal pipelines are pipelines used to transport coal from where it is mined to where it is consumed. For very short distances, large trucks are used to transport coal, but trains and barges are preferred for long distances. In some cases it is more economical to move the coal by pipeline than by train or barge. This can happen when there is no suitable railway or waterway to transport the coal, or when it must be moved very long distances.

There are two types of coal pipelines, slurry and log. Slurry pipelines use a slurry of water and pulverized coal. The ratio of coal to water is about 1 to 1 by weight. Coal log pipelines use coal that has been compressed into logs with a diameter 5 to 10% less than the diameter of the pipeline and a length about twice the diameter of the pipeline. The ratio of coal to water is about 3 or 4 to 1.

Coal needs a very low moisture content before it can be burned efficiently, so the coal must be dried after it arrives at the coal power plant. Coal transported as slurry requires a lot of drying and electricity generation will be substantially less if it is not dried effectively. Coal logs do not require as much drying because they are tightly packed so they do not absorb much water, and any water originally in the coal is squeezed out during compression. To dry the coal, the water is evaporated or separated in a centrifuge.

Large coal power plants use large amounts of coal each day; enough to fill a hundred train coal cars carrying 100 tonnes (98 long tons; 110 short tons) each. Water used to transport the coal is likewise significant, particularly in arid regions like the Southwestern United States. Such a power plant would use about 2.4 million US gallons per day (0.11 m^{3}/s) with a coal slurry pipeline or about 700,000 US gallons per day (2,600 m^{3}/d) with a coal log pipeline. This amounts to about 2,700 or 780 acre-feet (3,330,000 or 960,000 m^{3}) per year respectively. The 1,580-megawatt (2,120,000 hp) Mohave Generating Station in Laughlin, Nevada had the longest coal slurry pipeline in the world at 273 miles (439 km). From 1969 until 2005, the pipeline used 4,500 acre-feet (5,600,000 m^{3}) of water per year to carry about 5 million tonnes (4,900,000 long tons; 5,500,000 short tons) of coal to the plant from the Black Mesa Mine in the northeastern corner of Arizona. The plant was shut down on December 31, 2005 because the controversial coal and water supply terms were being renegotiated.

== See also ==
- Coal-water slurry fuel
