= Mohave Power Station =

Decommissioned coal-fired power plant in Laughlin, Nevada

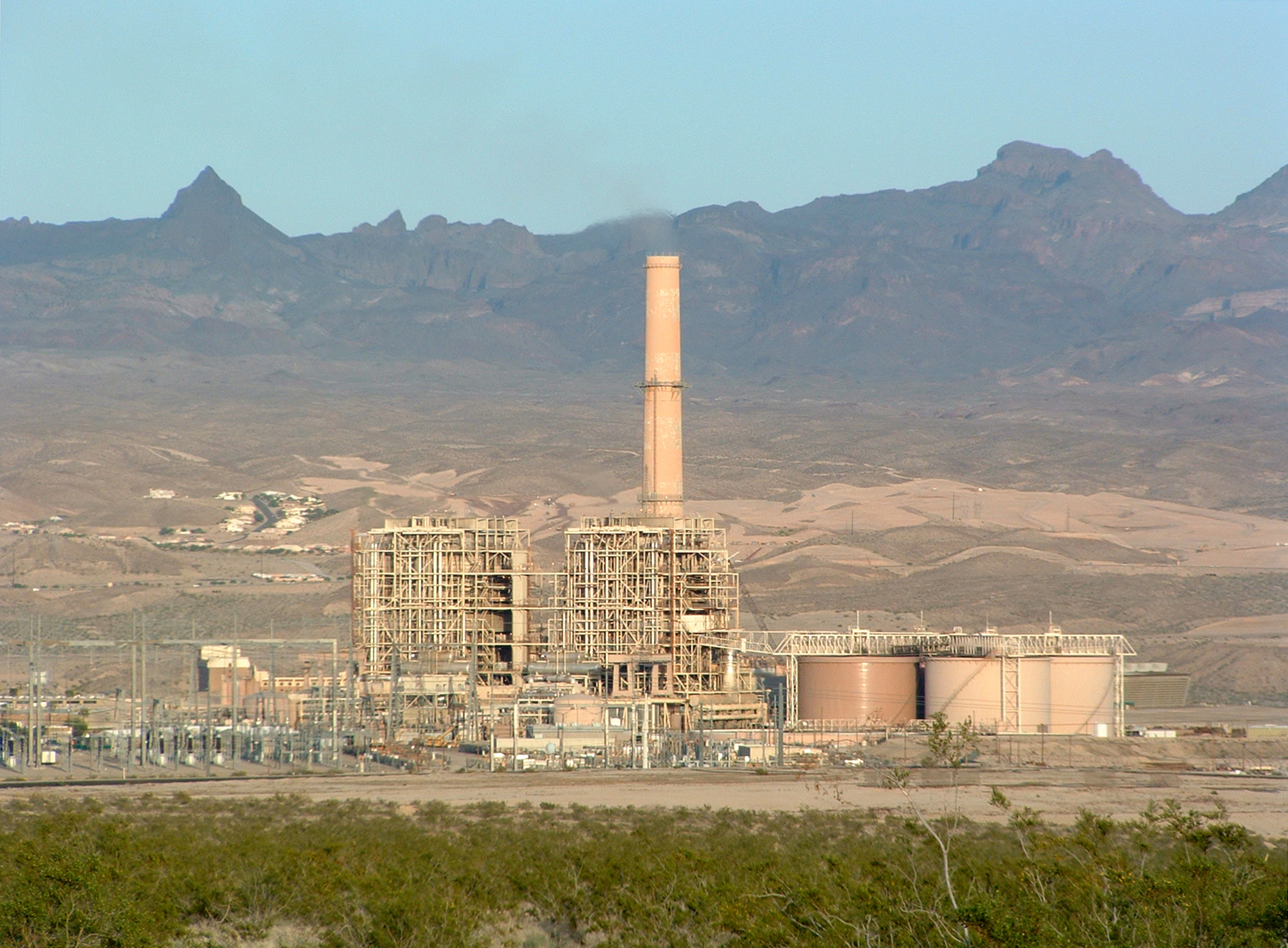
- Mohave Generating Station
- Country: United States
- Location: Laughlin, Nevada
- Coordinates: 35°08′42″N 114°35′19″W
- Status: Shut down
- Commission date: 1971
- Decommission date: 2005
- Owner: Southern California Edison

Thermal power station
- Primary fuel: Bituminous coal
- Turbine technology: Steam turbine

Power generation
- Units operational: 2 x 818.1 MW (1,097,100 hp)
- Nameplate capacity: 1,636.2 MW (2,194,200 hp)

External links
- Commons: Related media on Commons

Mohave Power Station (known also as Mohave Generating Station, or MOGS) was a 1580 megawatt electric (MWe) coal-fired power plant that was located in Laughlin, Nevada. Southern California Edison is the majority owner of the plant and was its operator. The plant entered commercial operation in 1971. A steam line that ran near the plant's control room and cafeteria ruptured on June 9, 1985, fatally scalding six and injuring ten more. In 2005, the plant was shut down and was later dismantled.

== Design ==
The plant was composed of two units capable of generating 790 MWe each. During normal operation, output varied between 350 and 750 MWe; the baseload plant operated with a capacity factor of 71.5% between 1990 and 1998. Combustion Engineering supplied the boilers and GE supplied the turbine-generators. Bechtel was the architect-engineer, responsible for engineering, procurement and construction.

The Mohave Generating Station was built on a 2,500-acre (1,000 ha) site in the Mojave Desert adjacent to the Colorado River in Laughlin, Clark County, Nevada. It had supercritical boilers and cross-compound steam turbines. The plant was owned by a utility consortium of operator Southern California Edison Co (56%), Salt River Project (20%), Nevada Power (14%) and LADWP (10%).

Mohave was the only power plant in the United States that used coal delivered by coal-slurry pipeline, composed of approximately half coal and half water. The 18 inch (460 mm) diameter Black Mesa Pipeline ran 275 miles (443 km) to the plant from the Peabody Energy Black Mesa Mine in Kayenta, AZ, and could deliver 660 short tons (600 t) per hour.

The coal slurry was stored in four storage tanks or eight Marcona ponds. Each storage tank held up to 8,000,000 US gal (30,000,000 L), the equivalent of 20,000 short tons (18,000 t) of dry coal; the conical Marcona ponds were each 436 ft (133 m) in diameter and 40 ft (12 m) deep, for a capacity of 3,040,000 cu ft (86,000,000 L) or 80,000 short tons (73,000 t) of coal. Eight full ponds was the equivalent of a 40-day supply of coal for the plant. The slurry transport water was separated from the coal through a series of centrifuges, which removed approximately 75% of the water, the damp coal then passed through pulverizers for drying and grinding. The plant had a total of 20 pulverizers, each of which could process 90,400 lb (41,000 kg) of coal per hour. The separated water was stored in clariflocculators to allow remaining coal fines to settle; the water was then recycled for cooling tower water makeup; this and all other waste water was reused, making Mohave a zero-discharge facility.

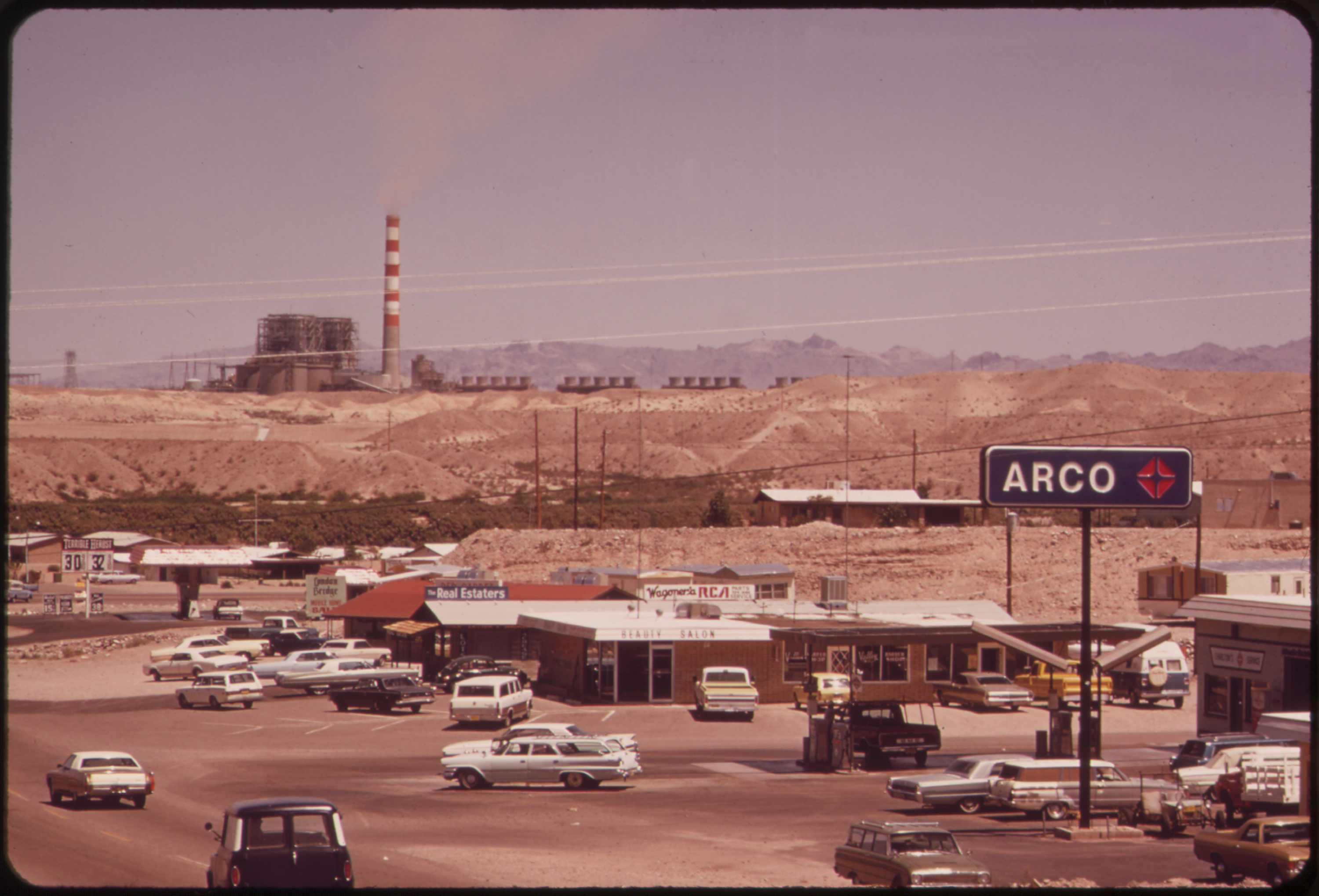
Bullhead City, Arizona with the prominent 500 ft (150 m) tall stack at Mohave in the background. Photo by Charles O'Rear for Documerica (1972).

At full capacity, the plant consumed 16,000 short tons (15,000 t) of coal per day. Ash was collected from the bottom of the steam generating units (bottom and economizer ash) and captured via electrostatic precipitation from the plant's stack (fly ash); 70% of the plant's total ash was fly ash, and almost all of the fly ash was sold to be used as a concrete additive. Approximately 160,000 cu yd (120,000 m^{3}) of bottom ash and 60,000 cu yd (46,000 m^{3}) of sludge were placed in an onsite landfill each year; the disposal site, named Ash Canyon, was approximately 360 acres (150 ha) in area.

A 20 in (510 mm) in diameter natural-gas pipeline also ran to the plant from a gas facility near Topock, Arizona to supply the required heat to start the plant, although the pipeline was too small to operate the plant exclusively on natural gas. Electricity was transmitted via two 500 kV lines to substations in southern Nevada and southern California.

== History ==
=== Commissioning ===
The plant's two identical units went into initial operation in 1971.

=== Early failures ===
The plant suffered two early failures before 1975.

Both of these failures were of the turbine-generators, and both failures occurred during unseasonably cold weather. The cold weather proved to be an essential clue. One of the joint owners (LADWP) was assigned to determine the cause of these failures, through use of computer simulations.

The power station and its connected 500 kV transmission systems (one to California, the other to Nevada) were subjected to extensive simulations, which ultimately led to identification of the root cause of the failures.

When initially installed, the then-new concept of "series compensation" (sets of capacitors connected in series at the sending- and receiving-ends of the transmission lines) were installed, with the expectation that this "series compensation" would reduce or even eliminate the losses inherent with long distance alternating-current power transmission lines (these losses do not occur with direct-current transmission).

What was not then known, but was later identified during the simulations, which were performed in the System Development Division of LADWP, was the series resistance of the ACSR transmission lines, when under near freezing conditions, combined with the "series compensation", which was designed to counteract the series impedance of the lines, could, under certain conditions of generation and load, and low ambient temperatures, place an effective negative impedance on the generators, thereby causing a mechanical response by the turbine-generators that resulted in their destruction.

This behavior had not been anticipated, and as it had not been anticipated, it could hardly have been simulated prior to the installation and commissioning of the power station. In general, such simulations formerly focused on steady-state system behavior, not subsystem transient behavior. These two failures caused a renewed interest in "dynamic" simulation. Only "static" (that is, steady-state) simulation had been done previously.

General Electric, the manufacturer of the turbine-generators, refused to repair or replace subsequent damage—after all it had already replaced two failed turbine-generators due to reasons which were then unknown, and were subsequently proved not to be its fault—so new operational procedures were implemented to prevent subsequent failures. These procedures were successful, and there were no more turbine-generator failures.

But, these new procedures would not address what later happened, due to other causes, including improper operation of the steam generator's "superheat"/"reheat" system, which is a usual, and necessary part of a "compound" turbine-generator system (a high-pressure 3600 rpm turbine-generator section compounded with a lower-pressure 1800 rpm turbine-generator section, both of which were supplied by the same steam generator, but using separate "loops").

Typical thermal power plant with two-stage turbine; the "superheat" line starts at the boiler exit (C) and proceeds through the flue before returning to the HP turbine (D); the "reheat" line starts at the HP turbine exit (E) and proceeds through the flue before returning to the LP turbine (F).

=== 1985 pipe failure disaster ===
At 3:25 pm on June 9, 1985, a 30-inch (760 mm) hot reheat line, carrying steam at 600 psi (4,100 kPa), burst open. The reheat line circulates exhaust steam from the high pressure turbine back through the boiler stack, where it is reheated before entering the low pressure turbine. A 1,000 °F (538 °C) steam cloud blew down a door leading to the control room of the station, fatally scalding six workers: Michael Bowman, John Dolan, Ernest Hernandez, Terry Leroy, Danny Norman, and Howard Turner. Ten others were injured. A preliminary report cited a faulty weld as the immediate cause. Approximately 35 employees were on-site at the time; of those, 20 were in the control room.

The station was out of service for six months while all the steam piping was replaced.

A report on the accident was completed in May 1991, but was not released until Christmas Day because of Edison's objections that it would compromise civil suits.

Although several factors contributed to the pipe's failure, the report said Edison's actions—or lack of actions—were "primary and critical factors in causing the accident":

- Edison knowingly operated the system at temperatures above design specification for long periods of time, and operators were unable to control the temperatures within the system as a result of a "design flaw."
- Even so, the pipe, part of a steam reheat system, was not routinely maintained or inspected, though the pipe shifted and distorted because of exposure to abnormal stresses, the report said.
- Edison's management made high production a priority over safety. In 1979, Edison disciplined a supervisor for ordering an unauthorized inspection of unrelated pipe welds. "The fear SCE management has instilled in its employees is counterproductive to safety and increases the chances that additional incidents as serious as this one may occur in the future," the report said.

The report found no evidence that the accident was caused by a specific action on the day of the pipe failure.

The report recommended sweeping changes to Edison's policies, including annual reports to the PUC on the utility's safety training, inspection and maintenance programs. In addition, the report argues that, because the accident was avoidable, the costs should be borne by Edison's shareholders, not its rate-paying customers.

=== Shutdown ===
The plant was shut down on December 31, 2005, with the possibility it may not reopen. With the shutdown of the plant, the mine supplying the coal was also closed as well. The land where the mine was located is owned by the Navajo and Hopi tribes. This closure had a major negative impact on the Hopi.

The plant was shut to comply with a consent agreement reached to settle a 1998 CAA lawsuit brought by several environmental groups. The plant had been targeted as a major source of pollution in the Grand Canyon and other locations to the east. Furthermore, the Hopi and Navajo signed an agreement preventing the use of water from the local aquifer to make up slurry. Various plans were presented, including selling the plant and retrofitting it to burn natural gas, although the latter would have required construction of a second high pressure gas line from Topock, 30 miles (48 km) to the south. Another option would have been to install exhaust scrubbers, which would have cost $1 billion.

In May 2007, SCE discontinued efforts to restart or sell the plant.

=== Dismantling ===
On June 10, 2009, Southern California Edison announced that the Mohave Generating Station would be decommissioned and all generating equipment would be removed from the site. Later, SCE announced that all administrative buildings on site would also be razed. The only structure remaining on the property will be the 500 kV switchyard, which will continue to serve as a switching location for the regional bulk power system as well as provide electricity to a nearby Nevada Power substation supplying the Laughlin area. As of December 2025 four solar and battery storage generators in Nevada are in the California Independent System Operator's interconnection queue to connect to the bulk power system through the Mojave 500 kV bus, although none are yet operational. (CAISO Public Queue report, accessed 19 Dec 2025)

Dismantling got underway in October 2009 and is expected to take 2 years and cost $30 million. About 300 staff lost their jobs when the plant was closed.

On March 11, 2011, the 500-foot (150 m) exhaust stack, a longtime landmark of the Laughlin/Bullhead City area, was felled by explosives.

In October 2016, the entire site was listed for sale.

== Owners ==
- Southern California Edison (56%)
- Salt River Project (20%)
- Nevada Power Company (14%)
- Los Angeles Department of Water and Power (10%)
