= Power plant efficiency =

Percentage of energy converted into electricity

The efficiency of a plant is the percentage of the total energy content of a power plant's fuel (the primary energy) that is converted into electricity (the secondary energy). When energy is converted from one for to another, such as from the chemical bonds in coal to electricity, some of the energy that was in the chemical bonds is lost as heat. Reducing the amount of energy that is lost to heat increases the amount of electricity produced per unit of fuel, thus increasing the efficiency of the power plant. In the U.S., about 60% of the energy used to produce electricity is lost as heat. One of the most common ways to measure the efficiency of a thermal power plant (e.g. a generator that is fueled by fossil fuels such as coal, natural gas, or oil) is by the plant's heat rate.

Some heat can be captured as useful energy when it is used in some type of combined heat and power system such as district heating (e.g. university heating), or in an industrial processes such as drying. Waste heat is also utilized in combined cycle plants to run two turbines, but this use of waste heat is not usually classified as a type of CHP as the heat is partially converted to electricity.

== Heat rate ==
Heat rate is a term commonly used in power stations to indicate the power plant efficiency. The heat rate is the inverse of the efficiency: a lower heat rate is better.

$\text{Heat Rate} =\frac{\text{Thermal Energy In}}{\text{Electrical Energy Out}}$

The term efficiency is a dimensionless measure (sometimes quoted in percent), and strictly heat rate is dimensionless as well, but often written as energy per energy in relevant units. In SI-units it is joule per joule, but often also expressed as joule/kilowatt hour or British thermal units/kilowatt hour. This is because joule or British thermal units (Btu) is commonly used when referring to thermal energy and kilowatt hour (kWh) is often used when referring to electrical energy.

Heat rate in the context of power plants can be thought of as the input needed to produce one unit of output. It generally indicates the amount of fuel required to generate one unit of electricity. Performance parameters tracked for any thermal power plant like efficiency, fuel costs, plant load factor, emissions level, etc. are a function of the station's heat rate and can be linked directly.

Given that heat rate and efficiency are inversely related to each other, it is easy to convert from one to the other. A 100% efficiency implies equal input and output: for 1 kWh of output, the input is 1 kWh. The thermal energy input to produce 1 kWh of output is 3.6 MJ or, equivalently, 3,412 Btu. Therefore, the heat rate of a 100% efficient plant is simply 1 or 1 kWh/kWh or 3.6 MJ/kWh or 3,412 Btu/kWh.

To express the efficiency of a generator or power plant as a percentage, invert the value. However, this only works if it is in dimensionless notation, i.e. the same unit are used for energy input and output. For example:

- A heat rate value of 5 gives an efficiency factor of 20%.
- A heat rate value of 2 kWh/kWh gives an efficiency factor of 50%.
- A heat rate value of 4 MJ/MJ gives an efficiency factor of 25%.

For other units, use the corresponding conversion factor for the units. For example, if using Btu/kWh, use a conversion factor of 3,412 Btu/kWh to calculate the efficiency factor. If the heat rate is 10,500 Btu/kWh, the efficiency is 32.5%, see below.

$10,500 \frac{\text{Btu}}{\text{kWh}} \times \frac{1}{3,412}\frac{\text{kWh}}{\text{Btu}} = 3.077$

$\text{Efficiency} = \frac{1}{3.077} = 0.325 = 32.5%$

The higher the heat rate (i.e. the more energy input that is required to produce one unit of electric output), the lower the efficiency of the power plant. The U.S. Energy Information Administration gives a general explanation for how to translate a heat rate value into a power plant's efficiency value.

Most power plants have a target or design heat rate. If the actual heat rate does not match the target, the difference between the actual and target heat rate is the heat rate deviation.

== Heat of Combustion ==
Rating efficiency is complicated by the fact that there are two different ways to measure the fuel energy input:

- LCV = Lower Calorific Value (same as NCV = Net Calorific Value) neglects thermal energy gained from exhaust H_{2}O condensation
- HCV = Higher Calorific Value (same as GCV, Gross Calorific Value) includes exhaust H_{2}O condensed to liquid water

Depending on which convention is used, a differences of 10% in the apparent efficiency of a gas fired plant can arise, so it is very important to know which convention, HCV or LCV (NCV or GCV) is being used.

== See also ==
- Fuel efficiency
- Energy conversion efficiency
- Thermal efficiency
- Electrical efficiency
- Mechanical efficiency
- Cost of electricity by source
