= Yuma International Airport =

Airport in Arizona, United States

Yuma International Airport MCAS Yuma

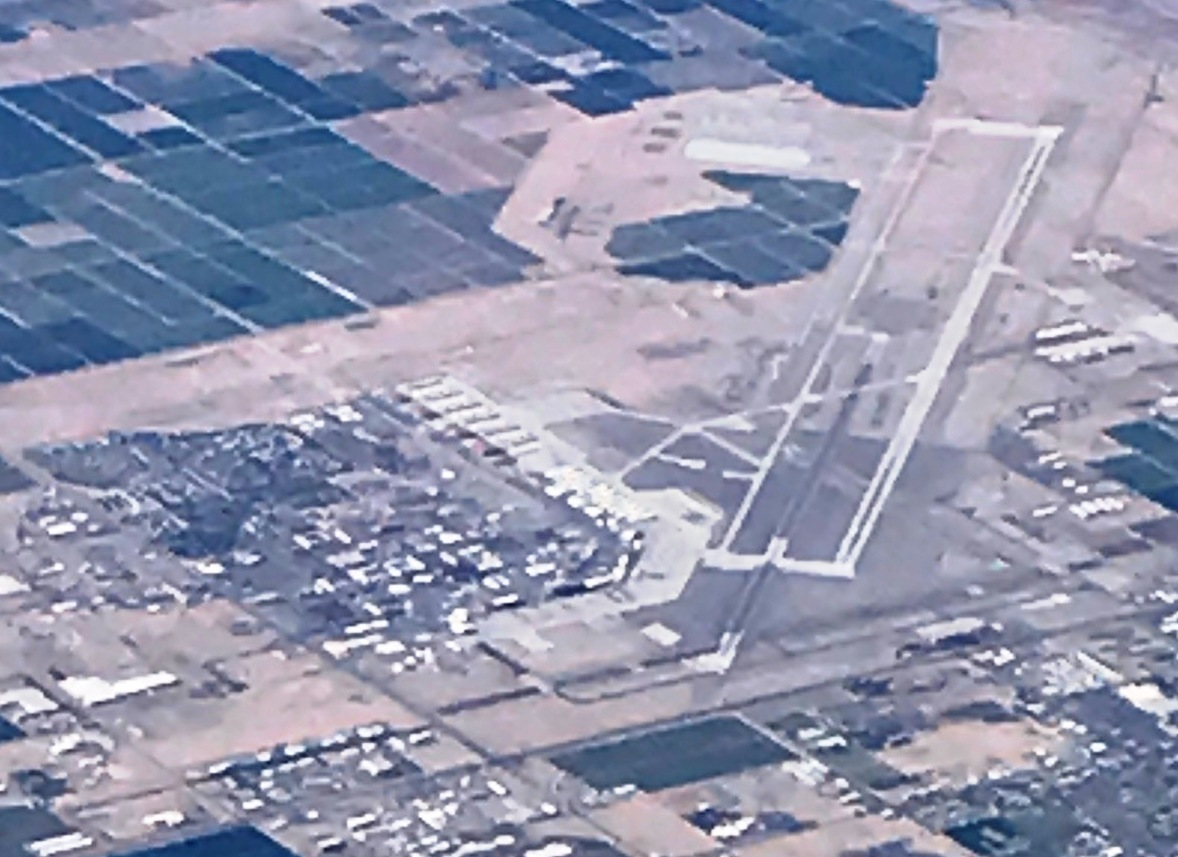
- Aerial view
- IATA: YUM; ICAO: KNYL; FAA LID: NYL

Summary
- Airport type: Public / Military
- Owner: United States Navy
- Operator: Yuma County Airport Authority and USMC
- Serves: Yuma, Arizona
- Hub for: AeroCare
- Elevation AMSL: 213 ft / 65 m
- Coordinates: 32°39′24″N 114°36′22″W
- Website: www.flyyuma.com

Maps
- FAA airport diagram

Runways
Direction	Length		Surface
Direction	ft	m	Surface
3L/21R	13,300	4,054	Concrete
3R/21L	9,239	2,816	Asphalt/concrete
8/26	6,146	1,873	Asphalt/concrete
17/35	5,710	1,741	Asphalt/concrete

Statistics (2021)
- Aircraft operations: 136,611
- Based aircraft: 183
- Source: Federal Aviation Administration

Yuma International Airport (IATA: YUM, ICAO: KNYL, FAA LID: NYL) is a joint use airport with civilian and military flight activity operated in conjunction with the U.S. Marine Corps via the Marine Corps Air Station Yuma. The airfield is located 3.5 miles (3.0 nmi; 5.6 km) south of the central business district of Yuma, a city in Yuma County, Arizona, United States, and 150 miles (130 nmi; 240 km) east of San Diego International Airport. It is mostly used for military aviation, but is also served by 4 commercial airlines and 2 aeromedical Medevac companies as well as being used for general aviation activities.

Although most U.S. airports use the same three-letter location identifier for the FAA and IATA, this airport is assigned NYL by the FAA and YUM by the IATA (which has not assigned NYL to any airport). The airport's ICAO identifier is KNYL.

== Facilities and aircraft ==
Yuma International Airport covers an area of 3,100 acres (1,300 ha) at an elevation of 213 feet (65 m) above mean sea level. It has four runways:

- 3L/21R measuring 13,300 by 200 feet (4,054 by 61 m), concrete
- 3R/21L measuring 9,240 by 150 feet (2,816 by 46 m), asphalt/concrete
- 8/26 measuring 6,146 by 150 feet (1,873 by 46 m), asphalt
- 17/35 measuring 5,710 by 150 feet (1,740 by 46 m), asphalt

For the 12-month period ending December 31, 2017, the airport had 179,838 aircraft operations, an average of 493 per day: 53% military, 38% general aviation and 9% air carrier. At that time there were 171 aircraft based at this airport: 41% single-engine, 9% multi-engine, 2% jet, no helicopter, 1% ultralight and 47% military.

== Airlines and destinations ==
=== Passenger ===
Airlines	Destinations
American Eagle	Dallas/Fort Worth, Phoenix–Sky Harbor

Destinations map
Destinations from Yuma International Airport

=== Cargo ===
Airlines	Destinations
Ameriflight	Nogales, Phoenix–Sky Harbor
FedEx Feeder	Phoenix–Sky Harbor

=== Top destinations ===
Top domestic destinations from YUM (June 2024 – May 2025)
Rank	Airport	Passengers	Airline
1	Phoenix, Arizona	61,930	American Eagle
2	Dallas/Fort Worth, Texas	19,100	American Eagle

== History ==
Yuma's history of flight dates to 1911 when Robert Fowler took off from Yuma to set a world's record for endurance and distance. He entered a Transcontinental Air competition sponsored by William Randolph Hearst. Originating in Los Angeles, he arrived in Yuma on October 25. Over 2,000 spectators watched the aircraft circle and make a landing. The next day he succeeded in setting a world's record.

In 1925, the Yuma Chamber of Commerce went to work to secure an airport for Yuma. After two years of negotiations, 40 acres (16 ha) of land was secured from the federal government. The land was cleared, leveled, and the first hangar constructed. The 40 acres (16 ha) of land was officially designated as an active airport and named Fly Field after Colonel Ben Franklin Fly. In the beginning, Fly Field had limitations, including loose sand and a lack of facilities. In 1925, the Chamber's Aviation Committee decided another 160 acres (65 ha) was needed to create a first-class landing field in Yuma. Intense negotiations resulted in a public/private land trade, along with a promise by the government to provide Fly Field a steel frame hangar capable of housing 12 airplanes. Congressman Douglas of Arizona introduced a bill asking for the lease of 640 acres (260 ha) of government land to Yuma County for 20 years at a cost of $1 per year, with the privilege of renewal for another 20 years at the same rate. President Calvin Coolidge signed the Yuma Aviation Bill on February 27, 1928. Almost immediately, the aviation committee started lining up activities for the airport. Yuma was selected to be a night stop for three transcontinental air races from New York to Los Angeles, and an international air race from Mexico to Los Angeles. The Chamber agreed to provide free gas and oil to the racers, at an estimated cost of $2,000. Yuma was also selected to be a stop-over for the first All American Tour of 25 Airplanes. In June of that year, the military announced that a United States Meteorological and Aerological station would be constructed at Fly Field at a cost of $30,000 and would be manned by four Army personnel, marking the first military presence at Yuma's airport.

In 1929, Yuma was selected as the first stop for the Women's Transcontinental Air Race. Amelia Earhart experienced landing problems and nosed her aircraft in the soft sand, destroying her propeller. A new propeller and mechanics were flown in from Los Angeles to make repairs so she could continue in the race. Fly Field experienced a downturn during the depression; but in the late 1930s it became clear that the United States faced a threat of conflict with the German Reich. The War Department needed facilities to train combat pilots and crews. Planning for the Yuma area, including a potential bombing range located between Yuma and Gila Bend, started in 1939 when a group of aeronautical experts toured the area. The Yuma County Board of Supervisors recommended Fly Field as a base for the Army Air Corps. Initially, Yuma County assumed the burden of airfield maintenance and limited the use exclusively to Army and Navy aircraft.

Money for the Fly Field expansion arrived early in 1941. Three separate government agencies pooled a total of $781,000 to initiate construction. By mid-year another $635,000 became available for re-paving the north–south runway. Between 1941 and 1942 two paved runways, each measuring 4,200 by 150 feet (1,280 by 46 m), were completed under the command of the 403rd Army Air Force Base Unit, Army Air Forces West Coast Training Center. In June 1942, the War Department authorized an additional $3 million. The first class of cadets arrived in January 1943 when the field was used for advanced pilot and gunnery training.

In September 1946, Yuma Army Air Field was scaled back and declared a surplus. The civilian portion of the field was returned to Yuma County, who again referred to it as Fly Field. The Chamber of Commerce promoted the City of Yuma airplane's famous endurance flights, which highlighted the region's weather which was very conducive to flying. This was a topic of particular importance to the military. The airport became very active as a military facility during the Korean War, and was used extensively by the U.S. Air Force. In early 1951, the county supervisors received a Department of Defense proposal to lease the airfield as a civilian-operated military training base with specific military and civilian sides. The Yuma County Board of Supervisors gave the U.S. Air Force a right of entry and, in 1956, the field was named Vincent Air Force Base.

In 1959, control of the base was given to the United States Navy and then, nine days later, to the U.S. Marine Corps. The base was renamed Marine Corps Air Station Yuma (MCAS Yuma) on July 20, 1962. In 1965, the Yuma County Board of Supervisors created the Yuma County Airport Authority in accordance with the provisions of section 10-451, of the Arizona Revised Statutes, to take over the airport and all associated activity. A board of directors was elected from the community to oversee the Airport Authority and all airport functions. In 2007, the board of directors passed a resolution declaring that Yuma International Airport was an "Aviation Partner" with MCAS Yuma. That partnership continues today, allows for unrestricted civil aviation use of the airfield facilities, including all runways and taxiways and promotes the security of the United States.

The airport's FAA location identifier was YUM (ICAO: KYUM) until June 2008, when it was changed to use MCAS Yuma's identifier of NYL (ICAO: KNYL). The IATA airport code, used for passenger travel, remains YUM.

== Historic airline service ==
Western Airlines was serving the airport in the late 1940s with Douglas DC-3 flights to Los Angeles via stops at the Imperial County Airport (which serves El Centro), San Diego and Long Beach. Bonanza Air Lines, a "local service" air carrier as defined by the federal Civil Aeronautics Board (CAB), began serving Yuma during the early 1950s. According to its March 1, 1953, system timetable, Bonanza was operating Douglas DC-3 prop aircraft into the airport with a daily westbound routing of Phoenix-Blythe-Yuma-El Centro-San Diego-Santa Ana-Los Angeles. At this same time, Bonanza was operating a daily eastbound DC-3 service with a routing of Los Angeles-Santa Ana-San Diego-El Centro-Yuma-Blythe-Phoenix-Prescott-Kingman-Las Vegas. By 1963, Bonanza had retired the DC-3 from its fleet and was operating all flights into the airport with new Fairchild F-27 turboprop aircraft. In 1964, the airline was operating nonstop F-27 propjet service to Phoenix with direct, no change of plane flights to San Diego and Los Angeles via an intermediate stop in El Centro. In 1968, Bonanza merged with Pacific Air Lines and West Coast Airlines to form Air West which continued to serve the airport with the F-27 with nonstops to Phoenix as well as direct flights to Los Angeles, San Diego, Santa Ana and Tucson. In late 1970, Air West was serving the airport with Douglas DC-9-10 and McDonnell Douglas DC-9-30 jetliners with four flights a day including two nonstops to Phoenix (PHX) and two one-stop direct flights to Los Angeles (LAX) via an intermediate stop in El Centro (IPL). At this same time, one of the DC-9 jet flights to LAX operated continuing, no change of plane service to San Francisco, Portland, Oregon and Seattle via intermediate stops at other Air West destinations. Air West would then be renamed Hughes Airwest which in 1972 had ceased jet service into the airport but was still operating nonstop F-27 propjet flights to Phoenix with direct service to Los Angeles and San Diego via a stop in El Centro.

By 1980, Hughes Airwest had transitioned to an all-jet fleet and was no longer serving Yuma. Following the cessation of service by Hughes Airwest, a number of commuter and regional airlines operated flights over the years into the airport. America West Airlines served Yuma as well with nonstop Boeing 737-200 jet service to its hub in Phoenix prior to being merged into US Airways. The following is a list of airlines and aircraft that served Yuma from 1974 through 1999 primarily with flights to Phoenix (PHX) and/or Los Angeles (LAX) with this information being taken from various editions of the Official Airline Guide (OAG) over the years:

- America West Airlines – Boeing 737-200, de Havilland Canada DHC-8 Dash 8
- America West Express operated by Mesa Airlines – Beechcraft 1900D
- Baja Cortez Airlines – Piper Chieftain
- Cochise Airlines – Cessna 402, Convair 440, de Havilland Canada DHC-6 Twin Otter, Fairchild Swearingen Metroliner
- Delta Connection operated by SkyWest Airlines – Embraer EMB-120 Brasilia, Fairchild Swearingen Metroliner
- Imperial Airlines – Cessna 402, Fairchild Swearingen Metroliner
- Scenic Airlines – Fairchild Swearingen Metroliner
- Sun Aire Lines – Fairchild Swearingen Metroliner
- Sun West Airlines – Beechcraft C99
- United Express operated by Mesa Airlines – Beechcraft 1900C
- United Express operated by SkyWest Airlines – Embraer EMB-120 Brasilia
- Wings West Airlines – Fairchild Swearingen Metroliner

Another commuter airline that served Yuma was Air Cortez. In 1981, Air Cortez was operating nonstop service to Ontario, CA (ONT) with Beechcraft 18 prop aircraft. Air Cortez also operated international flights from the airport with service to Guaymas, Loreto and Mulege in Mexico.

== Commercial airliner flight testing ==
The airport has been the location of flight testing of commercial jet airliners on several occasions in the past. In 1981, a wide body McDonnell Douglas DC-10-10 in the livery of Continental Airlines was engaged in flight tests of new, retrofitted winglets. In 1990, McDonnell Douglas conducted flight tests with new McDonnell Douglas MD-11 wide body jetliners. In 1999, Boeing conducted flight tests with new Boeing 717-200 jetliners. Boeing then returned to the airport in 2011 and conducted flight tests of the new Boeing 787-8 Dreamliner . Boeing has in 2022, 2024, and 2025 conducted tests with the 777X in yuma.

== Past controversy ==
=== Yuma International Airport relationship with MCAS Yuma ===
Over a span of many years the relationship between the airport and Marine Corps Air Station Yuma (MCAS Yuma) deteriorated to an exceptional degree. In October 2006, the Yuma County Airport Authority (YCAA) brought in a new management team to solve the problem. On January 9, 2007, the new airport director presented a resolution to the YCAA board of directors which acknowledged that MCAS Yuma and YCAA share the use of the airfield, that MCAS Yuma was important to the nation's security, and that both MCAS Yuma and YCAA provide important economic benefits to the region through their respective aviation efforts.

Most importantly, the resolution stated the YCAA identified itself as an "aviation partner" with MCAS Yuma and that the civilian airport staff would work in a spirit of cooperation and goodwill with the military.

The board unanimously approved the resolution. That first step initiated a transition between the two agencies. The term "aviation partner" became a focus of the airport in repairing the relationship. The result is what today is considered by many to be the best example of a joint use airfield between civilian and military operators in the nation.

== Medevac ==
Guardian Flight/AeroCare and Air Methods/TriState CareFlight provide air ambulance services to Yuma and the surrounding region. Each company operates both fixed and rotary wing aircraft.

== Incidents ==
On April 1, 2011, Southwest Airlines Flight 812 with 118 passengers en route from Phoenix to Sacramento diverted to the airport after a rapid decompression which was the result of a large tear in the plane's fuselage 40 minutes into the flight. The Boeing 737-300 series aircraft made an emergency landing at the airport (one flight attendant suffered minor injuries during the rapid descent), and a replacement aircraft was sent to the airport to board the passengers and complete the flight to Sacramento.

== Other tenants ==
Other tenants at Yuma International Airport include:

- CBP Air and Marine Operations
- Million Air
- Jacobs Engineering Group

== See also ==
- List of airports in Arizona
