= KGCN =

KGCN may refer to:

- KGCN (FM), a radio station (91.7 FM) licensed under construction permit to Roswell, New Mexico, United States
- KGCN, the ICAO code for Grand Canyon National Park Airport, in Coconio County, Arizona, United States
- KGCN, Knight Grand Cross of the Order of the Nation (Antigua and Barbuda) and other Orders of the same name
