= Flight 812 =

Flight 812 could refer to several separate incidents that occurred on a flight with that designation.

Listed chronologically

- Pan Am Flight 812, a Boeing 707 that crashed into mountainous terrain whilst preparing to land in Bali on 22 April 1974, killing all 107 on board. The accident was found to be due to both pilot error and instrument failure.
- Philippine Airlines Flight 812, an Airbus A330-300 which was hijacked just before landing on 25 May 2000. The hijacker robbed passengers and then parachuted out of the plane. His body was found, buried in mud, three days after the incident.
- Air India Express Flight 812, a Boeing 737-800 which overshot the runway at Mangalore International Airport on 22 May 2010, killing 158 passengers and crew on board.
- Southwest Airlines Flight 812, a Boeing 737-300 which suffered structural failure of the fuselage in flight on 1 April 2011, leading to explosive decompression. A successful emergency landing was made and all 122 occupants survived.
