= TriStar Airlines =

IATA	ICAO	Call sign
T3	TRY	TriStar Air
- Commenced operations: July 17, 1995; 31 years ago
- Ceased operations: January 1997; 29 years ago
- Operating bases: McCarran International Airport (Las Vegas)
- Fleet size: 1
- Destinations: 2
- Headquarters: Las Vegas, Nevada, United States

TriStar Airlines was an airline based at McCarran International Airport in Las Vegas, Nevada. It launched operations in July 1995 with scheduled flights to Los Angeles and San Francisco and added more destinations later in the year. TriStar utilized British Aerospace 146 aircraft on its routes. In late 1996, the airline began to suffer financial difficulties, deciding to reduce its scheduled operations in favor of the charter industry. Although it settled a lessor dispute in November 1996, TriStar ended all flights not long after in January 1997.

== History ==
TriStar Airlines began operations on July 17, 1995, with flights to Las Vegas, Los Angeles, San Francisco, and the Grand Canyon. It had a joint marketing agreement with Japan Airlines negotiated by Tulsie Issurdutt. Under this arrangement, TriStar Airlines transported Japan Airlines passengers on package tours to Las Vegas and the Grand Canyon. TriStar operated leased British Aerospace 146 (BAe 146) aircraft on all its routes. In November 1995, the airline introduced flights to Reno and Eugene, Oregon; flights to Aspen, Colorado, started the following month.

TriStar Airlines signed a marketing agreement with Eagle Canyon Airlines in June 1996, thereby ending flights to the Grand Canyon. Faced with financial troubles and low passenger numbers, TriStar decided to shift its focus to the more lucrative charter industry in September 1996. It ended flights to Reno and Eugene and reduced operations to Los Angeles and San Francisco.

In October 1996, British Aerospace terminated its lease to TriStar and sued for its aircraft's return, claiming TriStar owned the company US$3 million. As a result, all four of the airline's aircraft were grounded on October 28. TriStar and British Aerospace negotiated for the return of three aircraft, allowing TriStar to resume operations nine days later with a single BAe 146. At this point, TriStar only offered twice weekly Las Vegas–San Francisco flights, with charter operations reserved for the rest of the week.

The airline ended operations in January 1997.

== Corporate affairs ==
TriStar Airlines was headquartered in Las Vegas, Nevada, It used the slogan The better choice; color scheme of red, gray, black, and white, won the Award of Excellence For Logo Design in a 1996 American Corporate Identity competition. The airline had 160 employees in June 1996.

== Destinations ==
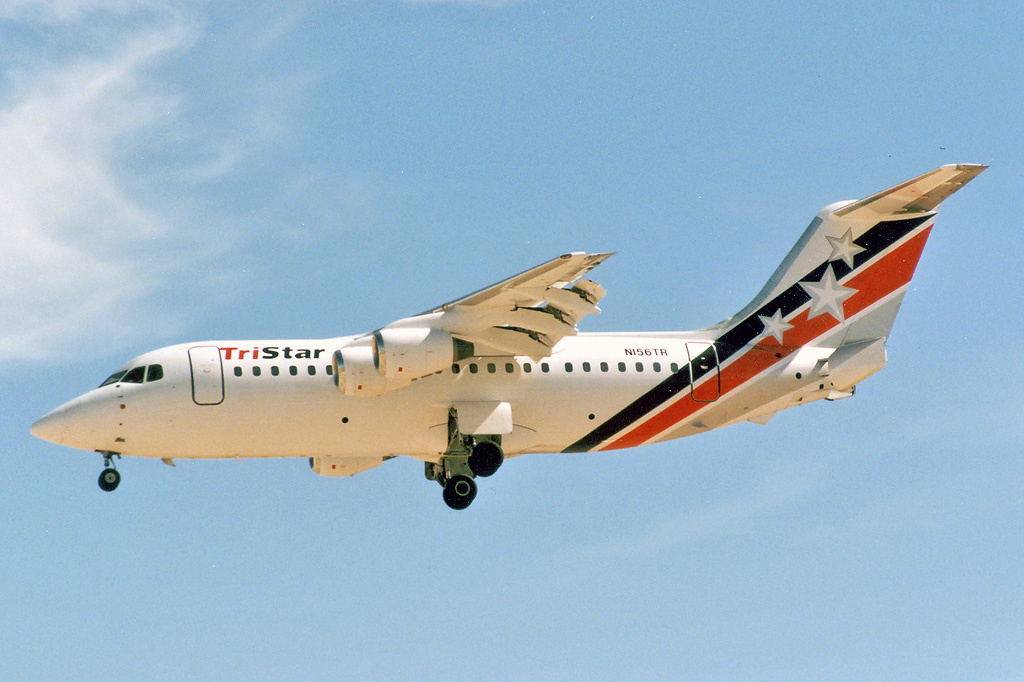
A TriStar Airlines BAe 146-200 on approach to McCarran International Airport in Las Vegas

At the time it ceased operations, TriStar Airlines offered scheduled flights to the following destinations:

- United States
  - Las Vegas – McCarran International Airport
  - San Francisco – San Francisco International Airport

The destinations below were terminated earlier:

- United States
  - Aspen, Colorado – Aspen–Pitkin County Airport (seasonal)
  - Eugene, Oregon – Eugene Airport
  - Grand Canyon – Grand Canyon National Park Airport
  - Los Angeles – Los Angeles International Airport
  - Reno – Reno–Tahoe International Airport

== Fleet ==
TriStar Airlines was operating a total of 5 British Aerospace 146 aircraft in June 1996, configured with 86 to 100 seats in an all–economy class layout. (Note: Sources state TriStar Airlines' aircraft had 86 seats, 100 seats, or 86–100 seats.) Following the settlement of a dispute with lessor British Aerospace, TriStar was allowed to retain a single BAe 146.

== Services ==
TriStar Airlines offered only one class of service, economy class. It offered assigned seating and complimentary snacks and beverages.

== See also ==
- List of defunct airlines of the United States
