= Bonanza Air Lines =

US airline (1945–1968) that merged into Air West

IATA	ICAO	Call sign
BL^{(1)}	BL^{(1)}	—
- Founded: 1945
- Commenced operations: August 5, 1946 as a Nevada intrastate airline; December 19, 1949 as a local service carrier
- Ceased operations: July 1, 1968(merged with Pacific Air Lines and West Coast Airlines to form Air West)
- Hubs: Las Vegas; Phoenix
- Headquarters: Las Vegas, Nevada (1945–1966); Phoenix, Arizona (1966–1968)
- Founder: Edmund Converse president

Notes
- (1) IATA, ICAO codes were the same until the 1980s

Bonanza Air Lines was a local service carrier, a scheduled airline focused on smaller routes in the Western United States (and eventually Mexico) from 1949 until it merged with two other local service airlines to form Air West in 1968. Its headquarters was initially Las Vegas, Nevada, and moved to Phoenix, Arizona in 1966.

The company started as Bonanza Air Service, a charter operator in Las Vegas, before becoming a Nevada intrastate carrier in 1946 operating between Las Vegas and Reno. In 1949 it obtained Federal certification as a local service (or feeder) airline, starting service between Phoenix and Reno the same year. In the 1950s and early 1960s the airline expanded into Arizona, Southern California and Utah, including Phoenix, Los Angeles and Salt Lake City. Until 1978 Bonanza had the only scheduled nonstop flights between Las Vegas and Reno. It became an international airline just before it merged with Pacific Air Lines and West Coast Airlines to form Air West, flying Douglas DC-9s to Mexico from Phoenix and Tucson.

== History ==
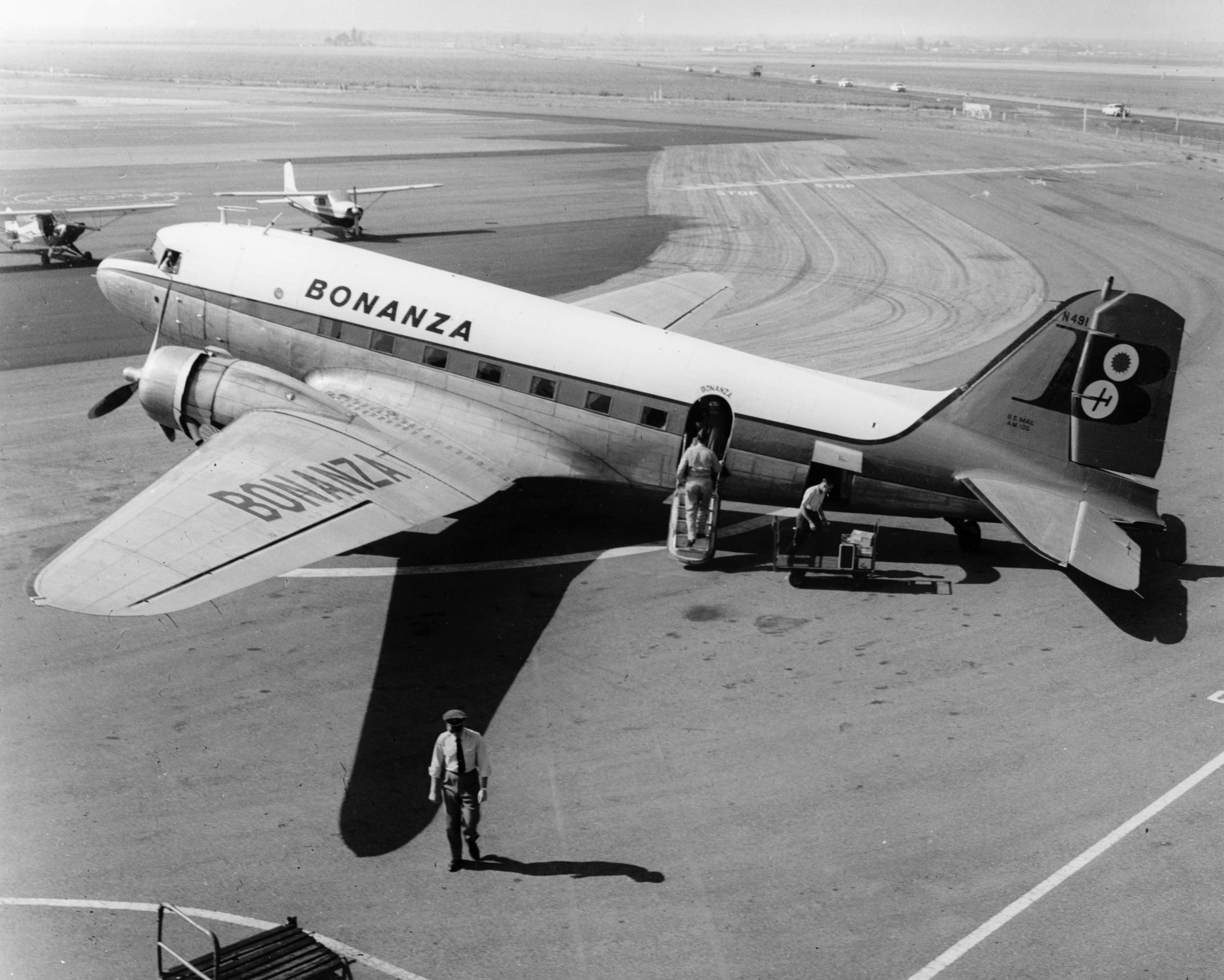
Douglas DC-3, Orange County Airport, circa 1958

Bonanza Air Service began charter operations in 1945 in Las Vegas with a single-engine Cessna. In 1946 it acquired a C-47 from Flying Tiger Line and had it converted to civilian Douglas DC-3 configuration. The airline started intrastate airline service from Las Vegas to Reno on 5 August 1946 as Bonanza Air Lines, initially three times a week, increasing up to daily by 2 September 1947, requiring another DC-3. In 1947 the airline applied to the Civil Aeronautics Board (CAB) for a certification as a feeder or local service airline. In June 1947, the airline announced a proposed merger with Arizona Airways, then also operating as an intrastate carrier, but within Arizona. However, there is no mention of such a merger in either of the CAB cases that awarded local service certificates to Arizona Airways and Bonanza.

In June 1949, the CAB awarded Bonanza a feeder certificate from Reno to Phoenix via intermediate points including Las Vegas. The award was unusual in that it involved the transfer of Las Vegas to Phoenix authority from trunk carrier Transcontinental & Western Air (TWA) to Bonanza. In 1945, Arizona Airways had asked the CAB to approve of a deal by which TWA would sell that route to Arizona Airways for $100,000 and the right to be a 20% owner. The CAB had deferred any decision until it awarded the feeder certification for the state of Arizona. In November 1949, the CAB approved a deal by which Bonanza bought the rights from TWA for $672.09, significantly less than what Arizona Airways had proposed to pay in 1945. Certificated operations began 19 December 1949.

There is no railroad between Las Vegas and Reno, and roads were primitive. Las Vegas and Reno were isolated from each other, with Las Vegas being better connected to Southern California and Reno to Northern California than to each other. Bonanza was credited with bringing the two parts of the state together. It also did a better job of the Vegas to Phoenix route than TWA had done, also credited with building traffic and bringing those two cities together. The founder and first president of Bonanza was Edmund Converse, who also funded much of its development. In July 1952, the airline started service on a new route from Phoenix to Los Angeles via many intermediate points.

Like other local service air carriers, Bonanza was subsidized by the federal government. In 1962 its operating revenues of $11.0 million included $3.2 million "Pub. serv. rev."

In 1959, Bonanza introduced Fairchild F-27s and unsuccessfully applied for routes to Texas. The F-27 was a U.S. built version of the Dutch built Fokker F27 Friendship. The last scheduled DC-3 flight was in late 1960, and Bonanza became the first all-turbine airline in the U.S. Bonanza F-27s flew to Grand Canyon National Park Airport (GCN) in northern Arizona with flights to Las Vegas, Phoenix, Salt Lake City and Tucson.

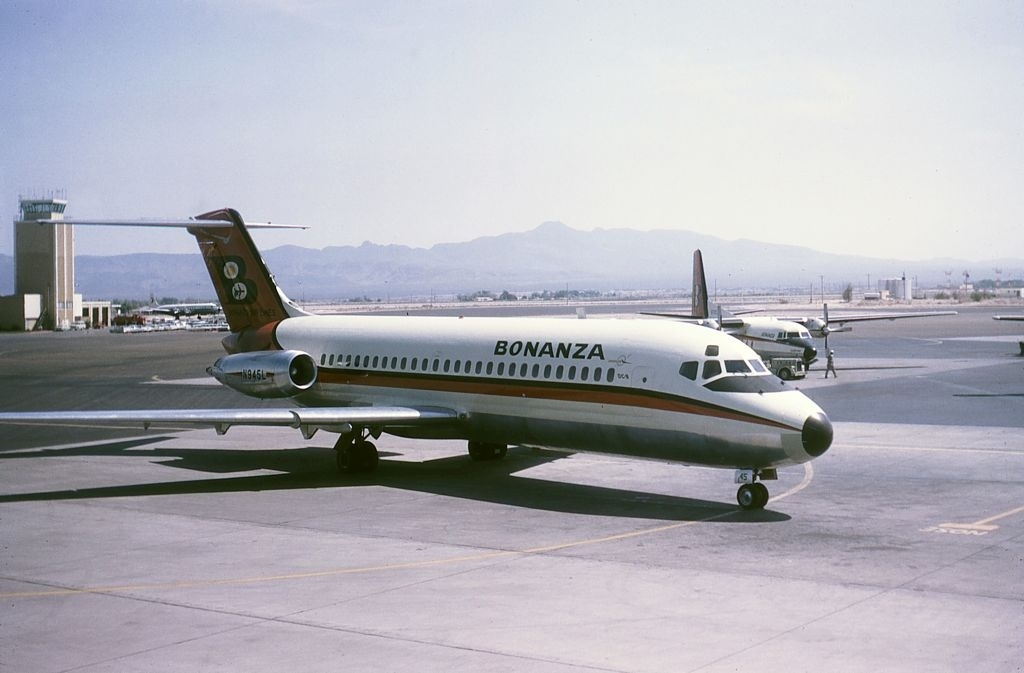
DC-9-14 Funjet at Las Vegas in 1966

Bonanza ordered three BAC One-Elevens in October 1962; this request was denied by the federal Civil Aeronautics Board (CAB), although U.S. authorities allowed American Airlines, Braniff International Airways, Aloha Airlines and Mohawk Airlines to purchase the same aircraft. An order was then placed for the U.S. built equivalent, the Douglas DC-9 series 10. Deliveries of the DC-9 began in late 1965 and flights commenced on March 1, 1966. The DC-9s, dubbed Funjets, flew the following routes in the first year: Las Vegas—Reno, Las Vegas—Los Angeles, Reno—Los Angeles, Salt Lake City—Phoenix, and Reno—Las Vegas—Phoenix. The headquarters moved to Phoenix during 1966.

Bonanza's April 28, 1968, timetable listed DC-9 jet service on the following routes:

- Las Vegas - Los Angeles
- Las Vegas - Phoenix
- Las Vegas - Orange County Airport (now John Wayne Airport)
- Las Vegas - Reno
- Las Vegas - Tucson
- Los Angeles - Las Vegas - Reno
- Los Angeles - Tucson - Phoenix
- Los Angeles - San Diego - Tucson
- Phoenix - Las Vegas - Reno
- Phoenix - Orange County Airport
- Phoenix - Tucson - La Paz - Mazatlan - Puerto Vallarta
- Salt Lake City - Phoenix - Tucson
- Reno - Las Vegas - Phoenix - Tucson

With Civil Aeronautics Board approval on April 17, 1968 Bonanza Air Lines merged with Pacific Air Lines and West Coast Airlines to form Air West on July 1. Bonanza's DC-9-10s and F-27As joined the new Air West fleet.

A McDonnell Douglas DC-9-31 (construction number 47246/registration N9333) was ordered by Bonanza but was delivered to Air West after the merger. It flew with Bonanza's successors until about 2009.

== Destinations in 1968 ==
The Bonanza route map in their April 28, 1968 timetable lists the following destinations. Cities in bold were served with DC-9 jets and F-27 turboprops or only by DC-9s while other destinations were served only by F-27s:

- Blythe, California (BLH)
- Cedar City, Utah (CDC)
- El Centro, California (IPL)
- Grand Canyon, Arizona (GCN)
- Kingman, Arizona (IGM)
- **La Paz, Mexico** (LAP)
- **Las Vegas, Nevada** (LAS)
- **Los Angeles, California** (LAX)
- **Mazatlan, Mexico** (MZT)
- Ontario, California (ONT)
- **Orange County, California** (SNA)
- Page, Arizona (PGA)
- Palm Springs, California (PSP)
- **Phoenix Arizona** (PHX)
- Prescott, Arizona (PRC)
- **Puerto Vallarta, Mexico** (PVR)
- **Reno, Nevada** (RNO) (Lake Tahoe was served via Reno)
- Riverside, California (RAL)
- **Salt Lake City, Utah** (SLC)
- **San Diego, California** (SAN)
- **Tucson, Arizona** (TUS)
- Yuma, Arizona (YUM)

Guaymas, Mexico (GYM) is shown on this map; however, Bonanza was not serving Guaymas at this time although it had the authority to do so. Earlier in 1968, the airline served Apple Valley, California (APV) with F-27s.

== Fleet ==
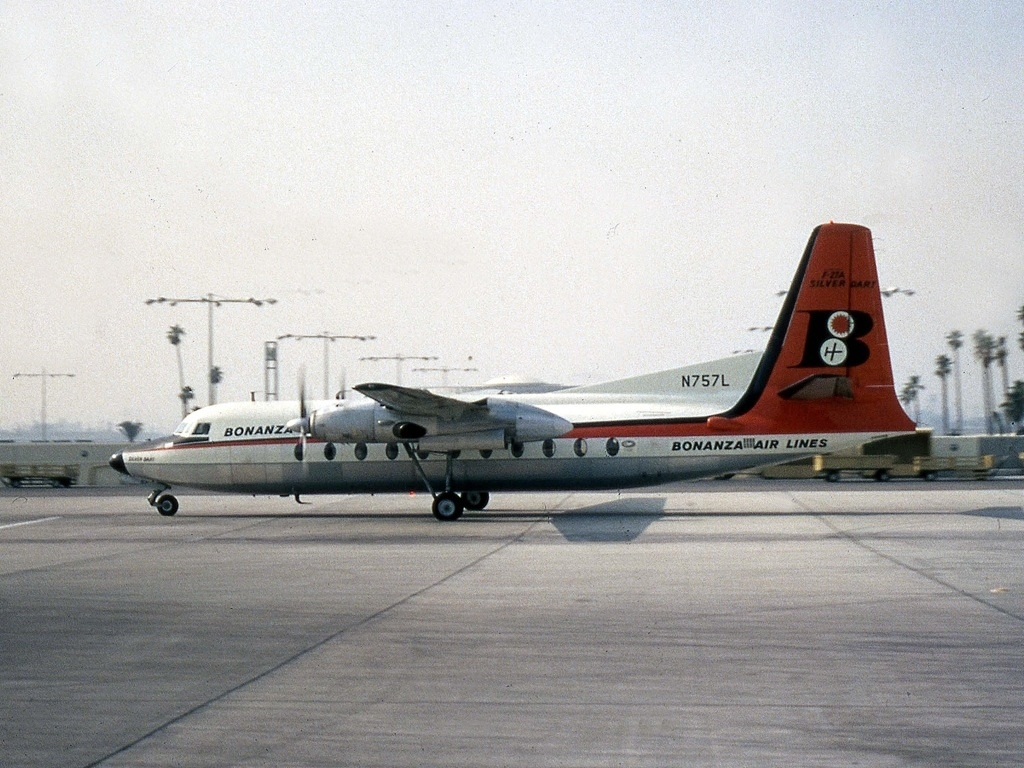
Fairchild F-27A, circa 1964

Bonanza Air Lines operated the following aircraft:

Aircraft	Total	Introduced	Retired	Notes
Cessna T-50	2	1945	Unknown	
Douglas C-47 Skytrain	10	1949	1963	
McDonnell Douglas DC-9-10	7	1965	1968	
Fairchild F-27A	17	1959	1968	
Grumman Gulfstream I	1	Unknown	Unknown	

== Legacy ==
- In 1970 Howard Hughes buys Air West, naming it Hughes Airwest.
- Republic Airlines buys Hughes Airwest in 1980.
- Northwest Airlines buys Republic in 1986
- Delta Air Lines buys Northwest in 2010

== Incidents and accidents ==
The airline's only fatal incident was on November 15, 1964, when Bonanza Air Lines Flight 114, flying from Phoenix, Arizona to Las Vegas, Nevada, crashed into a mountain south of Las Vegas during poor weather. There were no survivors among the 26 passengers and three crew on board the F-27.

== See also ==
- List of defunct airlines of the United States
