= 1986 Grand Canyon mid-air collision =

Fatal aircraft collision in Arizona, US

Coordinates: 36°08′12″N 112°14′47″W

1986 Grand Canyon mid-air collision Grand Canyon Airlines Flight 6 · Helitech Flight 2
Accident
- Date: June 18, 1986
- Summary: Mid-air collision
- Site: Grand Canyon National Park, Arizona, United States
- Total fatalities: 25
- Total survivors: 0

First aircraft
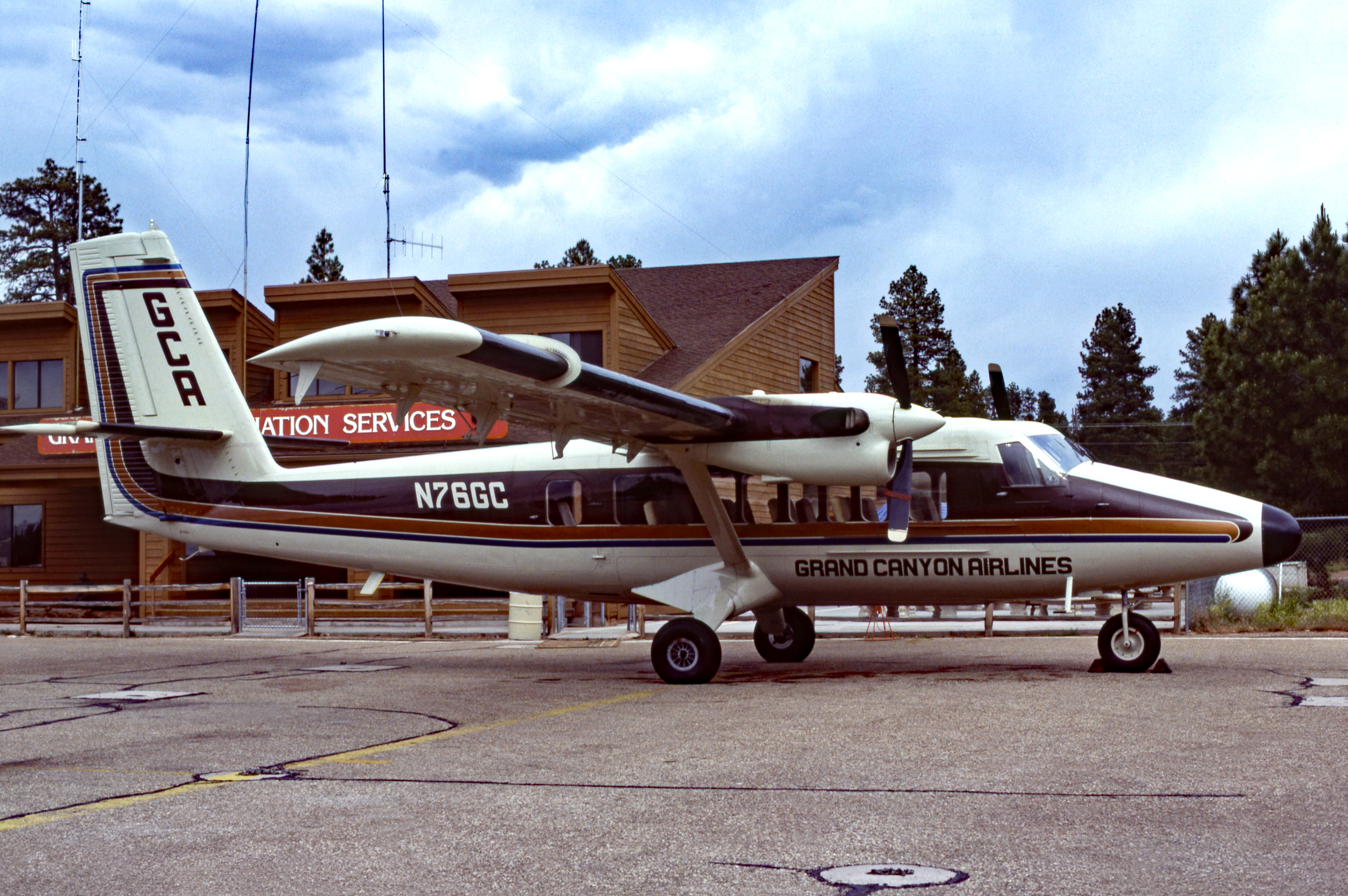
- N76GC, the aircraft involved in the collision, seen in August 1983
- Type: DHC-6 Twin Otter
- Operator: Grand Canyon Airlines
- Call sign: CANYON 6
- Registration: N76GC
- Flight origin: Grand Canyon National Park Airport, United States
- Destination: Grand Canyon National Park Airport, United States
- Occupants: 20
- Passengers: 18
- Crew: 2
- Fatalities: 20
- Survivors: 0

Second aircraft
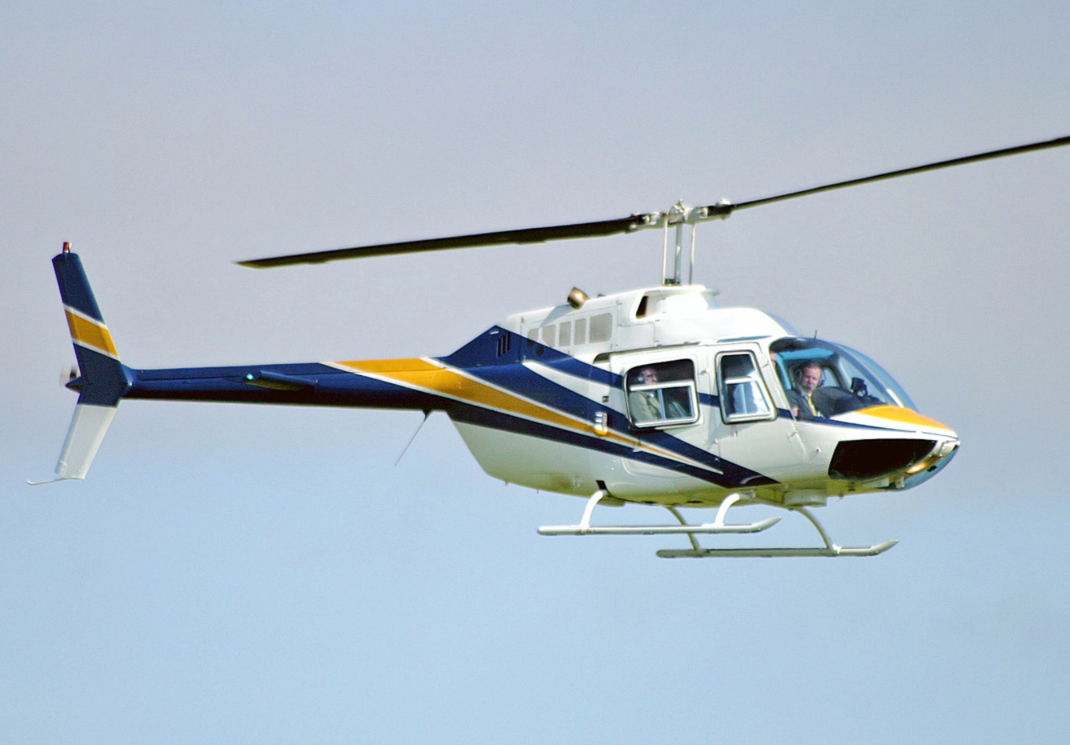
- A Bell 206 similar to the helicopter involved in the collision
- Type: Bell 206
- Operator: Helitech
- Call sign: TECH 2
- Registration: N6TC
- Flight origin: Tusayan, Arizona, United States
- Destination: Tusayan, Arizona, United States
- Occupants: 5
- Passengers: 4
- Crew: 1
- Fatalities: 5
- Survivors: 0

The Grand Canyon mid-air collision occurred when Grand Canyon Airlines Flight 6, a de Havilland Canada DHC-6 Twin Otter, collided with a Bell 206 helicopter, Helitech Flight 2, over Grand Canyon National Park on June 18, 1986. All 25 passengers and crew on board the two aircraft were killed. It remained the deadliest accident involving a helicopter on United States soil for nearly 40 years, surpassing the crash of Los Angeles Airways Flight 841 in 1968, until being surpassed itself by the Potomac River mid-air collision in 2025.

== Collision ==
On the morning of the accident, Grand Canyon Airlines Canyon 6 took off from Grand Canyon National Park Airport at 8:55 am for a sightseeing flight over Grand Canyon National Park with two pilots and 18 passengers on board; the pilots were operating their second scenic flight for the day. At 9:13 am, Helitech Flight 2 took off from the company's heliport in Tusayan, Arizona, for a 30-minute sightseeing flight. At approximately 9:33, at an altitude of approximately 6,500 feet (2,000 m), the Bell 206 and DHC-6 collided, with the helicopter on the left of the Twin Otter and the two aircraft traveling at approximately right angles to each other. The helicopter's main rotor struck the nose landing gear and tail of the Twin Otter. The Bell 206's main rotor was torn off and disintegrated and the Twin Otter's tail separated, causing both aircraft to crash. All 20 passengers and crew on Canyon 6, and the pilot and four passengers on Tech 2, were killed in the accident.

== Cause ==
The National Transportation Safety Board found that the crews of the two aircraft failed to 'see and avoid' each other, but could not determine why this occurred due to the lack of recorded flight data (there being no requirement for such recording for the scenic flights that were being operated). The accident investigation also found that the limited number of scenic points of interest in the Grand Canyon concentrated flights over these points, increasing the risk of collision; and recommended that the Federal Aviation Administration (FAA) regulate the separation of flight routes of fixed-wing aircraft and helicopters. Following the accident, the FAA imposed changes to the operation of scenic flights over the Grand Canyon.

== See also ==
- 1956 Grand Canyon mid-air collision
