= Southwest Airlines Flight 2294 =

2009 aviation incident in West Virginia

Coordinates: 38°22′33″N 081°35′35″W

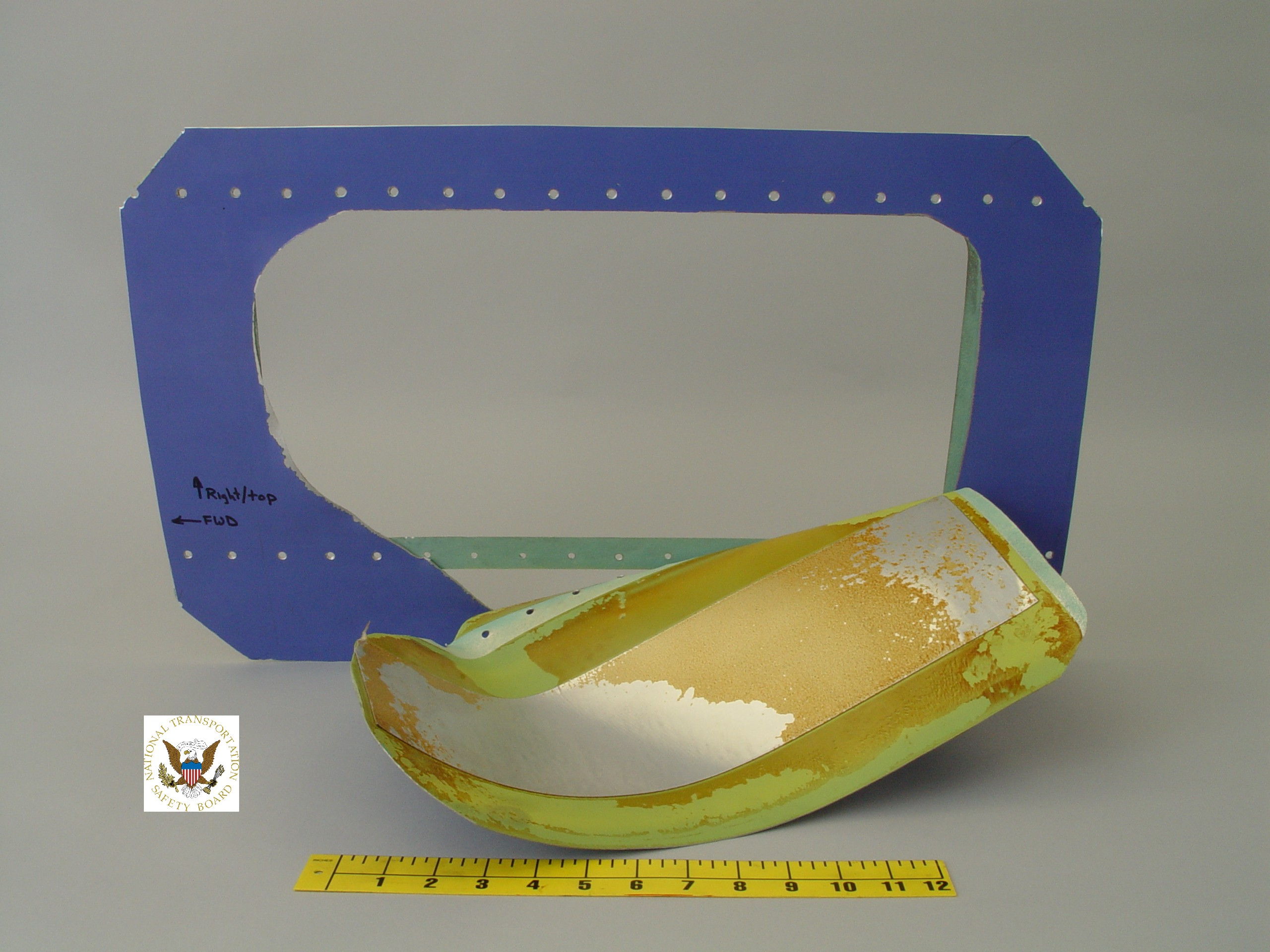
- Exterior view of the damaged fuselage section

Incident
- Date: July 13, 2009
- Summary: In-flight structural failure leading to rapid decompression
- Site: near Charleston, WV

Aircraft
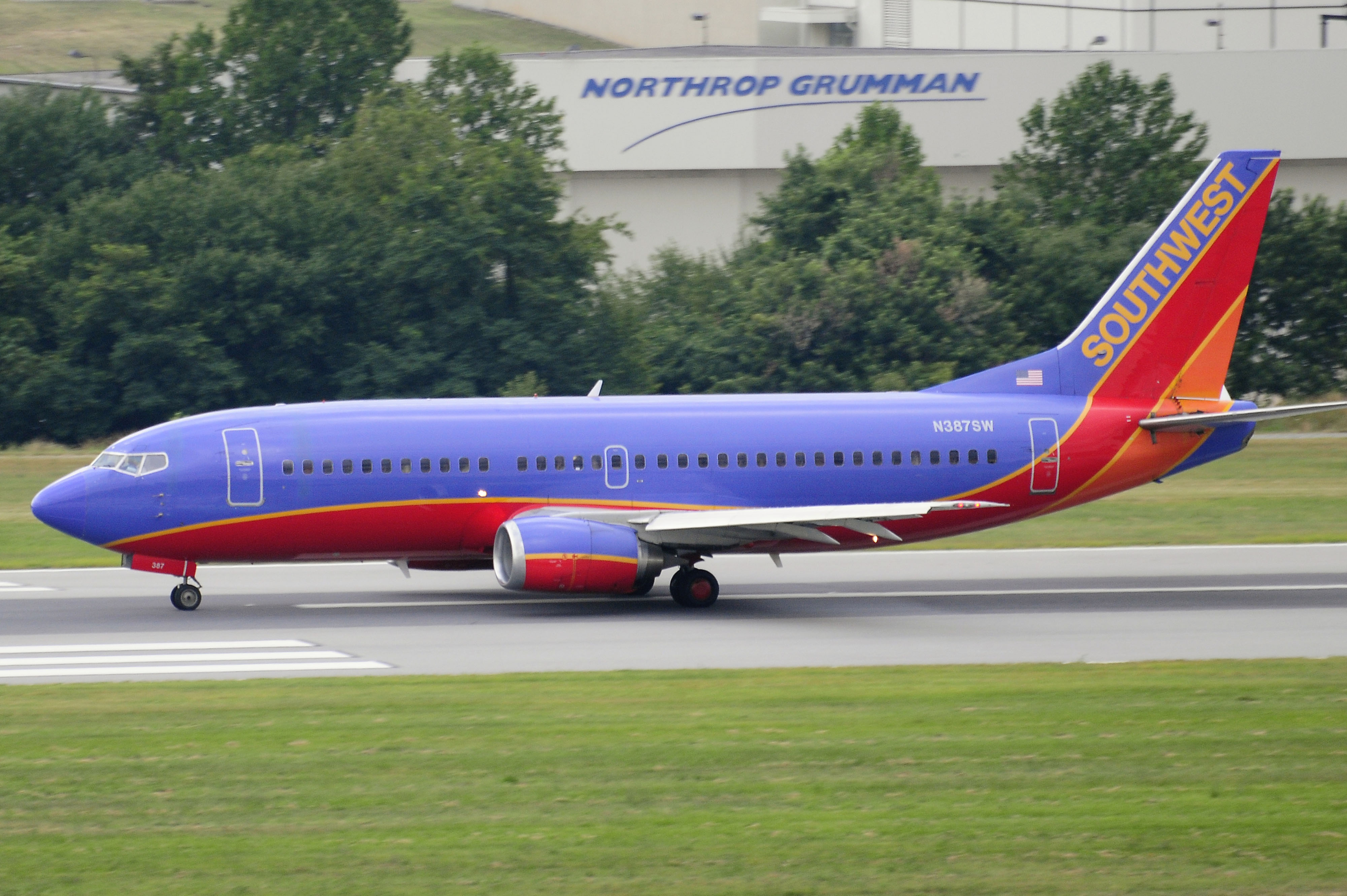
- N387SW, the aircraft involved, photographed 2 days before the incident
- Aircraft type: Boeing 737-3H4
- Operator: Southwest Airlines
- IATA flight No.: WN2294
- ICAO flight No.: SWA2294
- Call sign: SOUTHWEST 2294
- Registration: N387SW
- Flight origin: Nashville International Airport
- Destination: Baltimore Washington International Airport
- Occupants: 131
- Passengers: 126
- Crew: 5
- Fatalities: 0
- Survivors: 131

Southwest Airlines Flight 2294 was a scheduled US passenger aircraft flight which suffered a rapid depressurization of the passenger cabin on July 13, 2009. The Boeing 737-300 made an emergency landing at Yeager Airport in Charleston, West Virginia, with no fatalities or major injuries to passengers and crew. Investigation performed by the National Transportation Safety Board concluded that the incident was caused by a failure in the fuselage skin due to metal fatigue.

== Incident ==
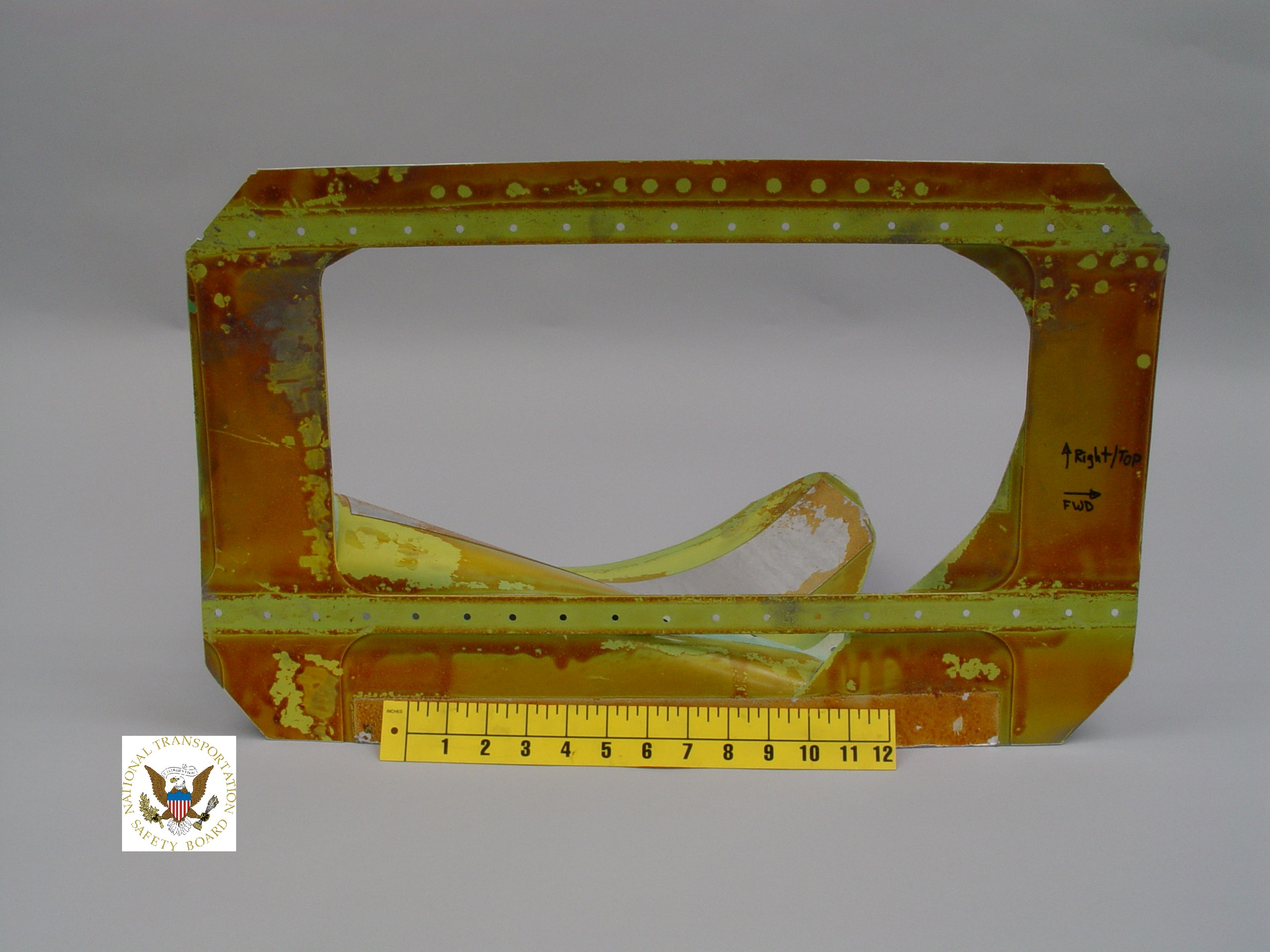
The interior of the damaged fuselage section

The aircraft involved was a Boeing 737-3H4, (Note: The aircraft is a Boeing 737-300 model. Southwest's customer code of "H4" is applied as a suffix in the model number.) registered as N387SW, with serial number 26602. 126 passengers and 5 crew members were on board, on a scheduled flight from Nashville International Airport to Baltimore/Washington International Airport. The aircraft took off from Nashville at 4:05 pm CDT (5:05 pm EDT) and climbed for about 25 minutes, leveling off at a cruising altitude of approximately 35,000 feet (11,000 m).

At about 5:45 pm EDT, the aircraft experienced a rapid decompression event, causing the cabin altitude warning to be activated in the cockpit, indicating a dangerous drop in cabin pressure. Passenger oxygen masks deployed automatically. The aircraft systems disengaged the autopilot, and the captain began an emergency descent to bring the aircraft down into denser air to prevent passenger hypoxia. The cabin altitude alarm ceased as the aircraft passed through about 9,000 feet (2,700 m).

The flight crew declared an emergency and landed the aircraft safely at Yeager Airport in Kanawha County, West Virginia, near Charleston. After landing, the aircraft was found to have a three-sided hole in the fuselage, 17.4 inches (44 cm) long, and between 8.6 to 11.5 inches (22 to 29 cm) wide, forward of the leading edge of the vertical stabilizer, at the rear end of the aircraft.

== Investigation ==
The incident was investigated by the Federal Aviation Administration (FAA) and the National Transportation Safety Board (NTSB). NTSB review of the cockpit voice recorder records, and post-incident interviews, showed that the flight crew acted appropriately in response to the emergency. The NTSB investigation found that the incident was caused by a metal fatigue crack in the fuselage skin.

The aircraft was delivered to Southwest Airlines in June 1994, and at the time of the incident flight, had accumulated approximately 42,500 takeoff/landing cycles, and 50,500 airframe hours. Highly magnified inspections found that a long metal fatigue crack had developed at the boundary of two different manufacturing processes used by Boeing in creating the fuselage crown skin assembly. Boeing finite element modeling had suggested that stress forces in this boundary region are higher due to differences in stiffness, indicating that a failure was more likely to occur in this area after a certain number of pressurization-depressurization cycles.

Following this incident, on September 3, 2009, Boeing issued a Service Bulletin calling for repetitive external inspections to detect any cracks in this more-vulnerable area of the fuselage skin. The FAA then followed up by issuing an Airworthiness Directive on January 12, 2010, mandating these inspection requirements.

Earlier criticism of the carrier's lax maintenance and inspection practices, for which the airline had been fined $7.5 million in 2008, was quickly echoed.

== Aftermath ==
On April 1, 2011, less than two years later, a similar incident occurred on Southwest Airlines Flight 812, involving another Southwest Airlines Boeing 737-3H4. In response to the second incident, the FAA issued an Airworthiness Directive requiring more frequent inspections by all airlines operating Boeing 737 Classic aircraft.

As of April 2024, Southwest Flight 2294 is a daily service from Honolulu to Hilo, operated by a Boeing 737 MAX 8 aircraft.
