= Bonanza Air Lines Flight 114 =

U.S. air crash

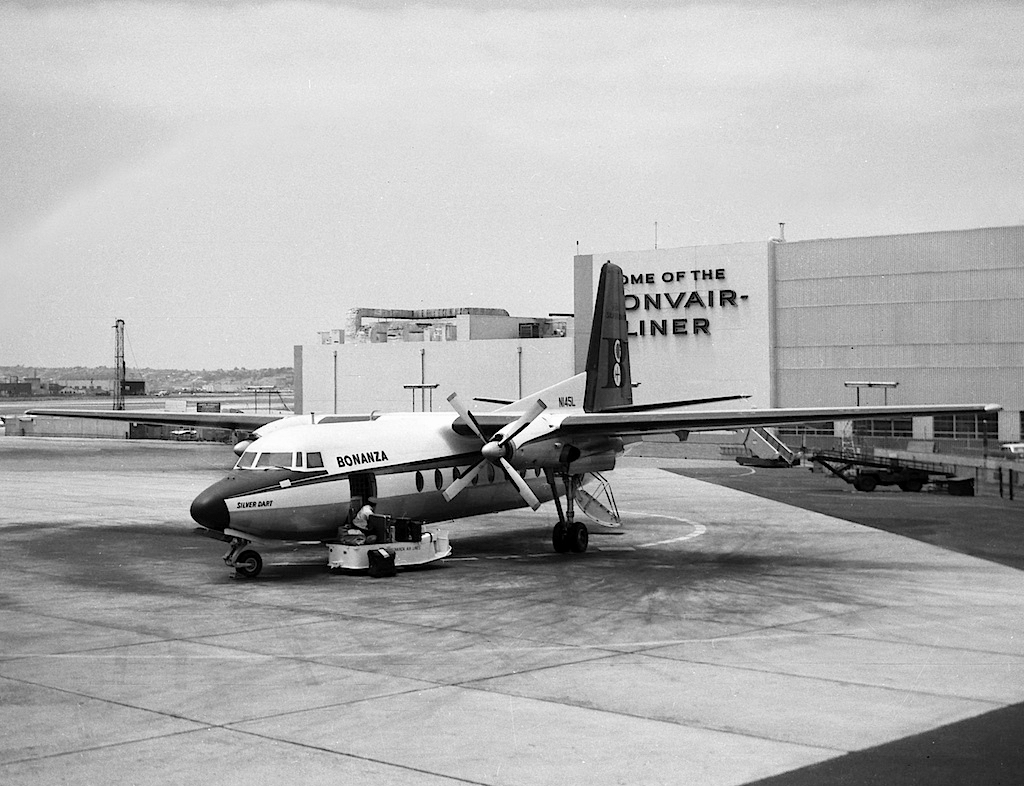
- The accident aircraft in January 1959 with old registration

Accident
- Date: November 15, 1964
- Summary: Controlled flight into terrain
- Site: Clark County, 2.7 miles (4.3 km) west of Sloan, Nevada; 35.9405°N 115.2647°W

Aircraft
- Aircraft type: Fairchild F-27
- Operator: Bonanza Air Lines
- Registration: N745L (formerly N145L)
- Flight origin: Phoenix Sky Harbor International Airport
- Destination: McCarran International Airport
- Passengers: 26
- Crew: 3
- Fatalities: 29
- Survivors: 0

Bonanza Air Lines Flight 114 was a Fairchild F-27 turboprop airliner flying out of Phoenix, Arizona, to McCarran International Airport in Las Vegas, Nevada, on the evening of November 15, 1964.

At 8:25 p.m., during a landing approach in poor weather conditions, it crashed into the top of a hill in open desert country about 8 miles (13 km) SSW of Las Vegas. All 29 aboard—26 passengers and a crew of three—died instantly when the plane exploded on impact, no more than 10 feet (3 m) below a ridge crest. Although this was not the only incident involving a Bonanza Air Lines airplane, it is the only crash with fatalities during the airline's 23-year history.

Media reports initially stated that 28 had died, but these were corrected when the body of a very young girl was found amid the debris. The rugged terrain and snowdrifts surrounding the crash site initially prevented ground vehicles from reaching the wreckage, so four helicopters assisted in the recovery efforts. Eventually a narrow, unimproved road one mile long that climbs up a ridge and terminates at the hilltop crash site was built to assist in salvage operations; it can still be seen in current aerial photos.

Pilot Henry "Hank" Fitzpatrick, a veteran with over 11,000 hours experience, was initially blamed for flying too low due to misreading the approach chart for McCarran International, but an investigation years later showed that the chart was marked in a non-standard, and possibly confusing, manner. Some heirs of the crash victims sued the publisher of the chart, but before a verdict was reached in the wrongful death lawsuit the chart company, Jeppesen, agreed to pay the plaintiffs US$490,000.
