= Apple Valley Airport (California) =

Airport in southeastern California

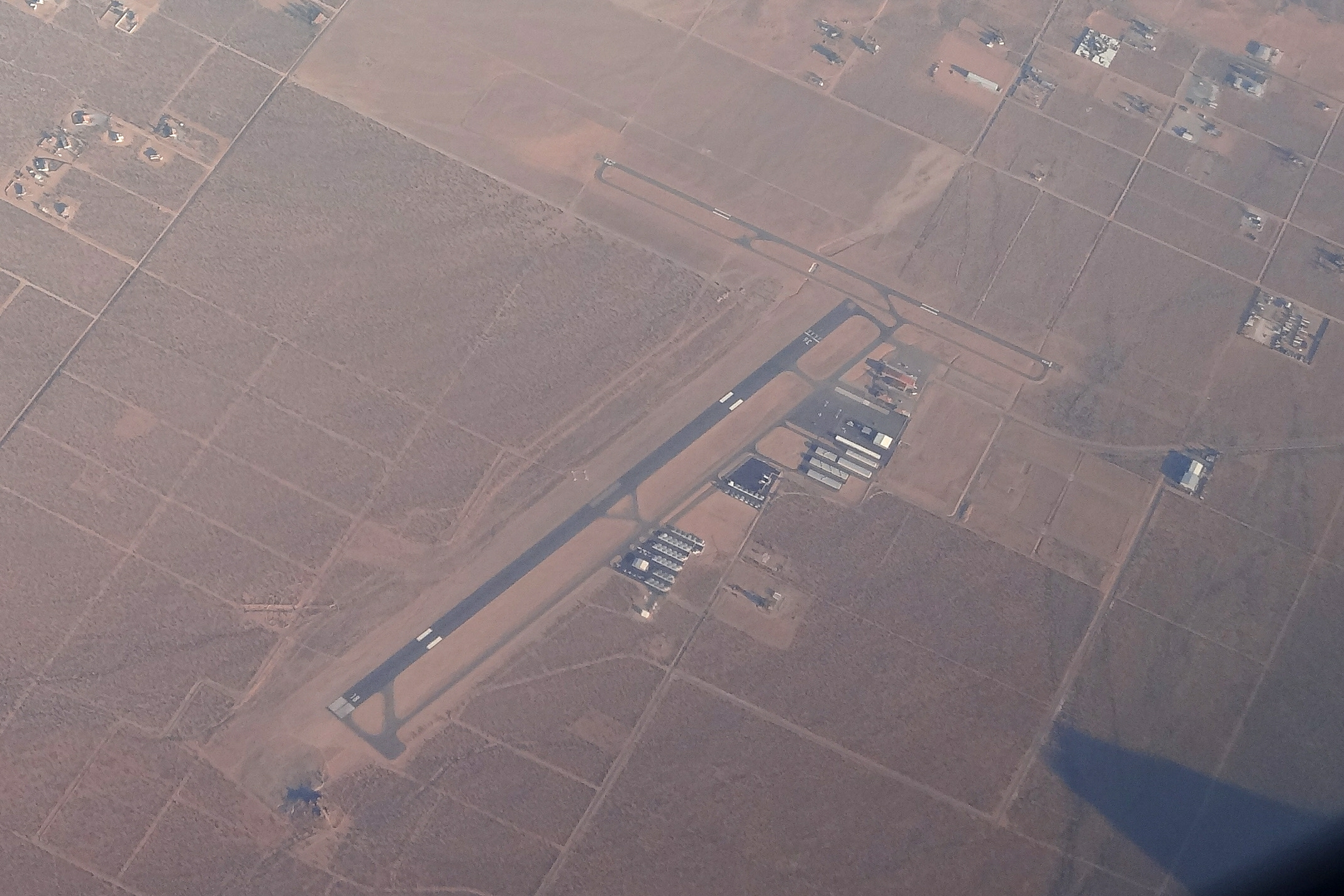
- IATA: APV; ICAO: KAPV; FAA LID: APV

Summary
- Airport type: Public
- Location: Apple Valley, California
- Elevation AMSL: 3,062 ft (933 m)
- Coordinates: 34°34′31.2″N 117°11′10.3″W
- Interactive map of Apple Valley Airport

Runways
Direction	Length		Surface
Direction	ft	m	Surface
18/36	6,498	1,981	Asphalt
8/26	4,099	1,249	Asphalt
- Source: Federal Aviation Administration

Apple Valley Airport (IATA: APV, ICAO: KAPV, FAA LID: APV) is a public airport three miles (4.8 km) north of Apple Valley in San Bernardino County, California, United States. The airport has two runways and is used for general aviation. It opened around 1970.

== Past airline service ==
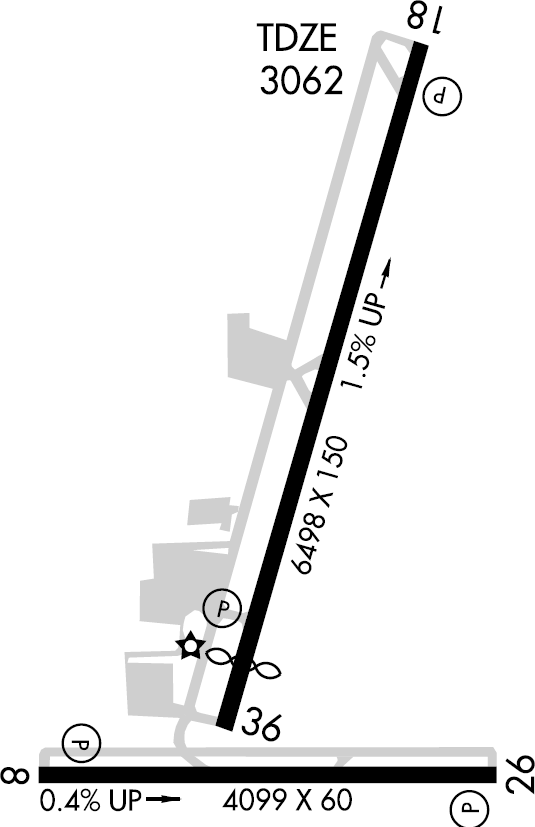
Apple Valley Airport diagram

The first airline flights to Apple Valley were to the old airport 34.528°N 117.215°W by Air West predecessor Bonanza Air Lines from the late 1950s until 1966: DC-3s, then Fairchild F-27s.

From 1970 to 1973 Apple Valley was served by Hughes Airwest (formerly called Air West) F-27s to Las Vegas, Riverside, Ontario, and Los Angeles (LAX). In 1979 commuter airline Inland Empire Airlines scheduled Swearingen Metros to Ontario, Los Angeles, Bullhead City, and Las Vegas.

== Facilities ==
The airport has two runways:

- 18/36: 6,498 x 150 ft (1,981 x 46 m), asphalt
- 8/26: 4,099 x 60 ft (1,249 x 18 m), asphalt
