= Cochise Airlines =

Commuter airline

IATA	ICAO	Call sign
DP	—	—
- Founded: 1971; 55 years ago Tucson, Arizona
- Ceased operations: c.1982; 44 years ago
- Destinations: Arizona and southern California
- Headquarters: Tucson, Arizona, United States

Cochise Airlines was a commuter airline which was founded in 1971 in Tucson, Arizona. It operated until 1982. Cochise linked small cities in Arizona with Phoenix, Arizona and Tucson, Arizona and also served southern California and New Mexico at one point.

== History ==
According to the February 1, 1976 edition of the Official Airline Guide (OAG), Cochise was operating de Havilland Canada DHC-6 Twin Otter turboprop aircraft as well as Cessna 402 prop aircraft. By 1979, the airline was flying Swearingen Metroliner (Metro II) turboprops. In 1979, the airline purchased two Convair 440 which were previously operated by Scandinavian Airlines. One route served with the Metro II at this time was Tucson (TUS) - Phoenix (PHX) - Yuma (YUM) - Imperial, CA (IPL) - Los Angeles (LAX) while another route served Phoenix (PHX) - Flagstaff (FLG) - Winslow (INW) - Gallup (GUP).

Besides serving Phoenix, Tucson, Imperial and Yuma, the February 1, 1976 OAG listed scheduled service operated by Cochise into the following destinations in Arizona: Flagstaff (FLG), Grand Canyon National Park Airport (GCN), Kingman (IGM), Lake Havasu City (LHU), Page (PGA), Prescott (PRC) and Winslow (INW).

By 1981, Cochise was flying a Convair 440 propliner nonstop between Tucson (TUS) and San Diego (SAN) and also on the Tucson - Phoenix - Yuma - El Centro - Los Angeles route in addition to Metro II propjet service on the latter route. The Convair 440 was the largest aircraft type ever operated by the airline. Also in 1981, Cochise was flying a Phoenix (PHX) - Blythe, CA (BLH) - Los Angeles (LAX) route in addition to operating its other routes within Arizona and southern California.

The air carrier's two letter airline code in the OAG was "DP".

== Destinations in 1974 ==
According to its April 15, 1974 route map, Cochise was serving the following destinations:

- Douglas, Arizona
- Flagstaff, Arizona
- Fort Huachuca/Sierra Vista, Arizona
- Grand Canyon National Park Airport, Arizona
- Kingman, Arizona
- Lake Havasu City, Arizona
- Phoenix, Arizona - Hub
- Prescott, Arizona
- Tucson, Arizona - Home base and focus city
- Yuma, Arizona

== Destinations in 1979 ==
According to its November 15, 1979 route map, Cochise Airlines was serving the following destinations:

- Blythe, California
- Flagstaff, Arizona
- Fort Huachuca/Sierra Vista, Arizona
- Gallup, New Mexico
- Grand Canyon National Park Airport, Arizona
- Imperial, California - El Centro, California was served via the Imperial County Airport
- Kingman, Arizona
- Los Angeles, California (LAX)
- Phoenix, Arizona - Hub
- Prescott, Arizona
- Tucson, Arizona - Home base
- Winslow, Arizona
- Yuma, Arizona

The airline also served San Diego, California during the early 1980s.

Cochise ceased all operations on June 2, 1982.

== Fleet ==
Piston aircraft:

- Cessna 402
- Convair 440 - largest aircraft type operated by the airline

Turboprop aircraft:

- de Havilland Canada DHC-6 Twin Otter
- Swearingen Metroliner (Metro II model)

== See also ==
- List of defunct airlines of the United States
