= Southwest Airlines Flight 812 =

2011 aviation accident in Arizona

Coordinates: 32°39′24″N 114°36′22″W

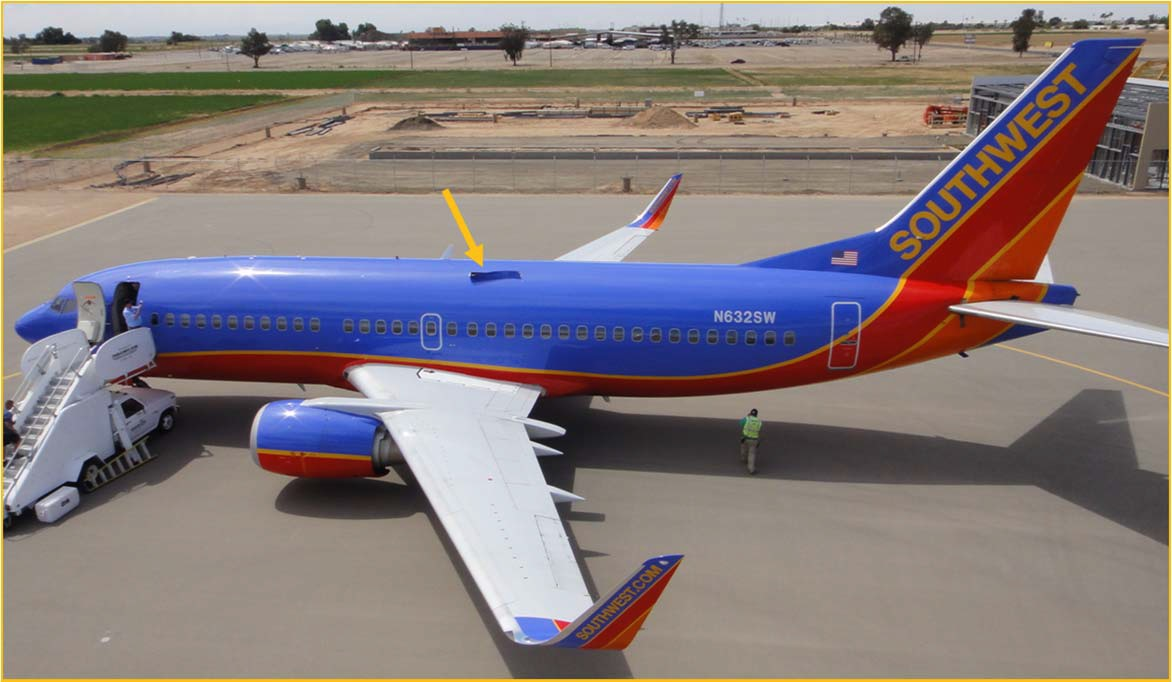
- The aircraft after the incident, with the yellow arrow indicating the failure in the upper fuselage skin

Incident
- Date: April 1, 2011
- Summary: Rapid decompression caused by in-flight structural failure
- Site: near Yuma, Arizona

Aircraft
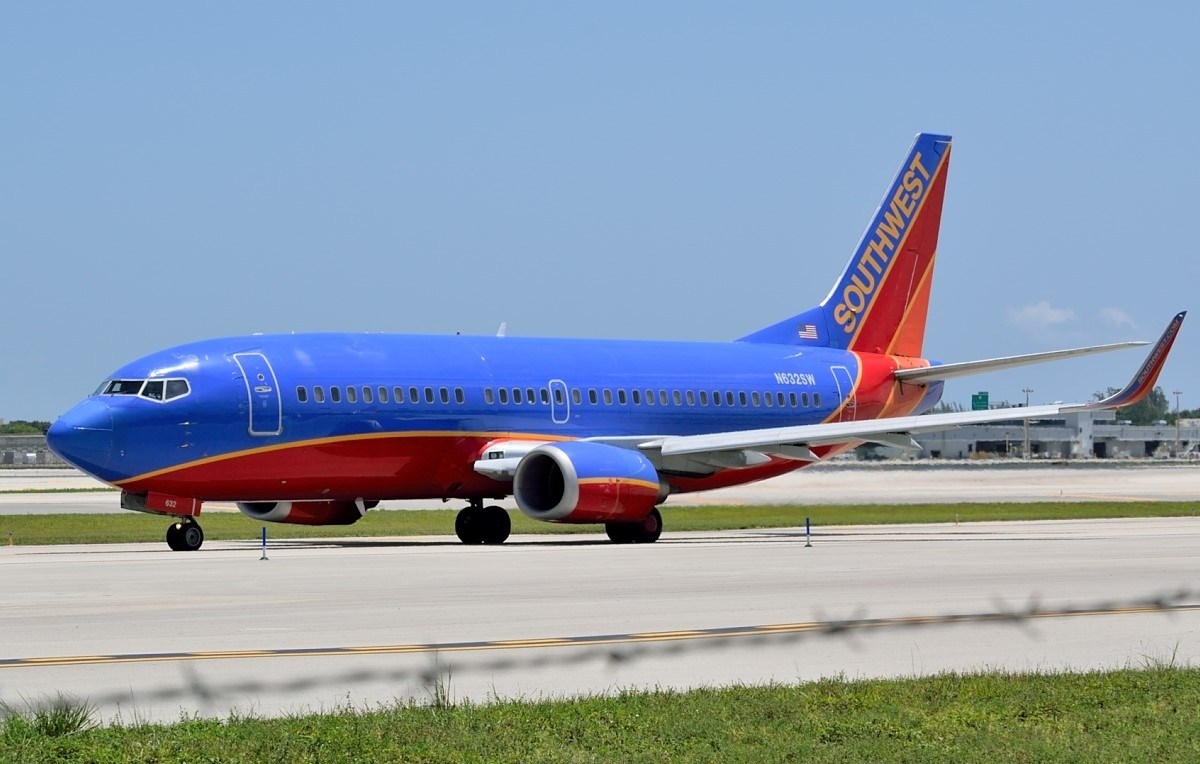
- N632SW, the aircraft involved in the incident, seen in 2016 after being repaired
- Aircraft type: Boeing 737-3H4
- Operator: Southwest Airlines
- IATA flight No.: WN812
- ICAO flight No.: SWA812
- Call sign: SOUTHWEST 812
- Registration: N632SW
- Flight origin: Phoenix Sky Harbor International Airport, Phoenix, Arizona, U.S.
- Destination: Sacramento International Airport, Sacramento, California, U.S.
- Occupants: 122
- Passengers: 117
- Crew: 5
- Fatalities: 0
- Injuries: 2
- Survivors: 122

Southwest Airlines Flight 812 was a domestic flight from Phoenix Sky Harbor International Airport in Phoenix, Arizona, to Sacramento International Airport in Sacramento, California, operated by a Boeing 737-300 passenger jet. On April 1, 2011, the flight suffered rapid depressurization while cruising at 34,000 ft (10,000 m) near Yuma, Arizona, leading to an emergency landing at Yuma International Airport. Two of the 122 people on board suffered minor injuries.

The depressurization was caused by the structural failure of the fuselage skin, which produced a hole approximately 60 inches (150 cm) long on the upper fuselage. The NTSB investigation revealed evidence of pre-existing metal fatigue, and determined the probable cause of the incident to be related to an error in the manufacturing process for joining fuselage crown skin panels.

The incident was the second of this type in less than two years, following the structural failure of Southwest Airlines Flight 2294 in 2009, and led to the FAA increasing the inspection rate of certain airframes.

== Incident ==
Flight 812 was a domestic scheduled passenger flight from Phoenix Sky Harbor International Airport to Sacramento International Airport. On April 1, 2011, it was carrying five crew and 117 passengers. Takeoff and initial climb-out were normal. As the aircraft approached its cruising altitude, at approximately 15:58 local time (22:57 UTC), while climbing through FL344 (34,400 feet [10,485 m]) to reach FL360 (36,000 feet [10,973 m]), a loud bang was heard, recorded as an unidentified noise on the cockpit voice recorder (CVR). According to eyewitnesses, one of the ceiling panels dislodged.

About two seconds later, the captain announced that cabin pressurization had been lost, and called for oxygen masks on. At this point, sounds of increased wind noise were heard on the CVR. Cabin oxygen masks deployed. The captain declared an emergency to air traffic control, and received clearance to make an emergency descent. The pilots performed a rapid descent to 11,000 feet (3,353 m), where atmospheric pressure is sufficient to prevent hypoxia. At this point the flight attendants began relaying reports to the pilots of an injury and a "two-foot hole" in the fuselage. The pilots requested a further descent to 9,000 feet (2,700 m) and vectors to the nearest airport that could accommodate the 737. The aircraft then landed without further incident at 16:23 at the joint Marine Corps Air Station Yuma/Yuma International Airport.

One flight attendant and an off-duty airline employee received minor injuries, but were both treated at the airport. The flight attendant had been attempting to make an interphone call to the pilots or a PA announcement to the passengers, instead of immediately donning his oxygen mask as he had been trained. As a result, he lost consciousness, fell, and struck the forward cabin partition, breaking his nose. An off-duty airline employee rushing to assist the flight attendant also lost consciousness, fell, and received a cut to the head. Both regained consciousness as the aircraft descended. A spare aircraft with maintenance technicians, ground crew, and customer service agents was dispatched from Phoenix to take the passengers to Sacramento. The replacement aircraft was expected to reach Sacramento with a 4-hour delay to the passengers on board Flight 812.

This was the second structural failure, rapid decompression, and emergency landing for Southwest Airlines in two years. Southwest Airlines Flight 2294, also a 737-300, suffered a football-sized hole in its fuselage on July 13, 2009, in a similar incident. That aircraft also made a safe emergency landing.

== Aircraft ==
The aircraft involved was Boeing 737-3H4 (Note: The aircraft is a Boeing 737-300 model. Southwest's customer code of "H4" is applied as a suffix in the model number.) with registration N632SW, manufacturer's serial number 27707, line number 2799. It was delivered to Southwest in 1996 and at the time of the accident had completed 48,748 hours and 39,786 cycles.

The aircraft fuselage was manufactured at Boeing's facility at Wichita, Kansas, and was shipped in two pieces (forward and aft sections) by rail from Wichita to Boeing's Renton, Washington, facility for final assembly. The Renton facility then joined the forward and aft fuselage sections, completing a drilling and riveting process that had been intentionally left unfinished at the Wichita facility, for ease of production in Renton. The area of fuselage crown skin that would fail in this incident was at the site of the split manufacturing process, where work was partially performed in Wichita and finished in Renton.

== Aftermath ==
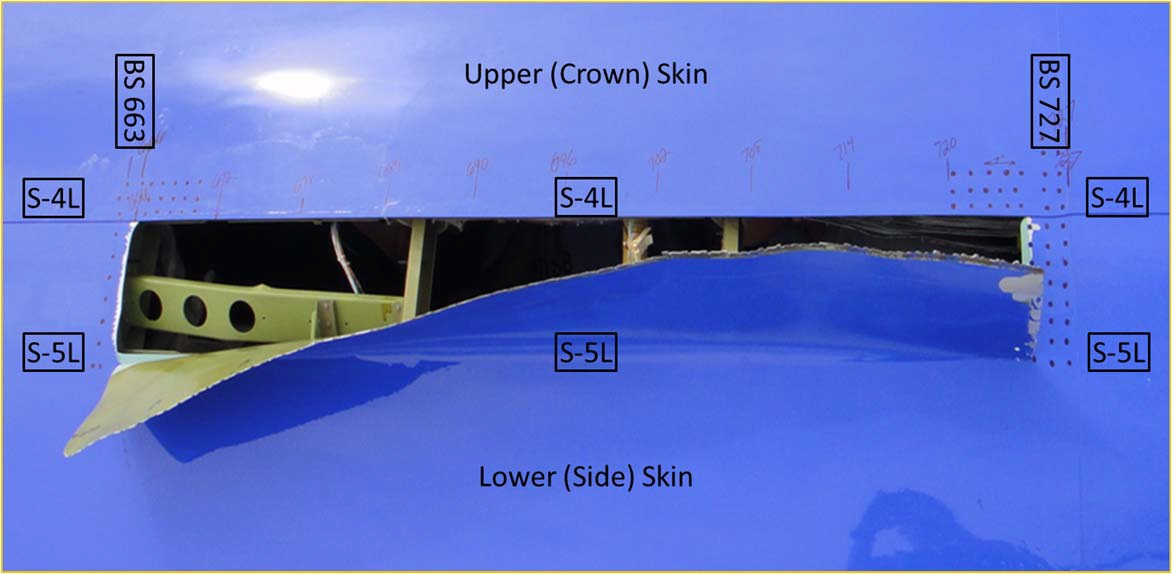
Annotated photograph of the 60-inch-long (150 cm) hole in the fuselage skin caused by the failure, from the NTSB report

Inspection of the aircraft at Yuma revealed a section of fuselage skin had fractured and flapped open, causing the rapid decompression. The opening was approximately 60 inches (150 cm) long and 8 inches (20 cm) wide. Southwest grounded 80 of its Boeing 737-300s for inspection following the incident. The grounded aircraft were those that had not had the skin on their fuselage replaced. Five aircraft were discovered to have cracks. The aircraft were to be repaired and returned to service. As of April 3, 2011, Boeing was developing a Service Bulletin for the inspection of similar aircraft.

On April 5, 2011, the FAA issued an emergency airworthiness directive (AD) requiring operators of 737 series 300, 400 and 500 aircraft to increase the frequency of inspections of lap joints on high flight cycle airframes. The AD requires that aircraft with over 30,000 cycles be inspected within 20 days of receipt of the AD, or upon reaching 30,000 cycles. For aircraft with over 35,000 cycles, the inspection is required within 5 days. The AD also requires periodic inspections of the same joints at every 500 cycles for aircraft with over 30,000 cycles. The AD refers to a range of airframes, line numbers 2553 – 3132 inclusive, totaling 580 aircraft. Of the total of 580 aircraft, only 175 met the 30,000 cycle requirement at the time of the AD issuance, with 80 of those operating in the United States. The FAA AD is effective to only the portion of those that are registered in the United States, since the FAA can only mandate such changes in the United States. Countries with reciprocity airworthiness agreements will also follow the AD, but other nations are not required to adhere to the ruling. As a result of the incident, the FAA investigated Boeing's manufacturing techniques to discover whether or not they had any bearing on the cause of the failure. The incident aircraft was not considered to have a high number of cycles. Boeing co-operated with the FAA in the investigation.

Air New Zealand inspected all fifteen of their 737-300s and Qantas inspected four of their 21 737-400s. Several of the thirty-seven 737-400s operated by Malaysia Airlines were also to be inspected.

Post-incident interviews showed the injured flight attendant had seriously overestimated his time of useful consciousness, and the NTSB renewed its criticism of the FAA's overly-optimistic time of useful consciousness tables and training requirements.

== Investigation ==
The Federal Aviation Administration sent an inspector to Yuma. The National Transportation Safety Board opened an investigation into the incident. Inspection of the 5 feet (1.5 m) long tear revealed evidence of pre-existing fatigue. The tear was along a lap joint. In March 2010, cracks had been found and repaired in the same place on the incident aircraft. The cause was determined to have been a manufacturing error dating from when the aircraft was built.

== In popular culture ==
The events of the incident were documented in a series two episode of Aircrash Confidential titled "Maintenance Failure".

The event was referenced in a Weekend Update segment of Saturday Night Live in episode 19 of season 36. Kristen Wiig played a flight attendant from the flight named Shelly Elaine.

== See also ==
- Aloha Airlines Flight 243
- Southwest Airlines Flight 2294
- Southwest Airlines Flight 1380
- Daallo Airlines Flight 159
- Qantas Flight 30
