= Air Cortez =

US airline

- Commenced operations: 1977; 49 years ago
- Ceased operations: 1986; 40 years ago
- Operating bases: Ontario Airport, Ontario, California

Air Cortez was a United States FAR 121 and 135 commuter airline that operated from 1977 to 1986. Air Cortez served a number of cities in Southern California, Arizona, Nevada and Baja California. In 1981, Air Cortez was operating nonstop passenger service between Ontario Airport (ONT) and Yuma, Arizona (YUM) with a Beech 18 prop aircraft. In 1985, the airline was operating scheduled passenger service between Las Vegas (LAS) and Grand Canyon National Park Airport (GCN) with Fairchild F-27 turboprop and Cessna 402 prop aircraft. Air Cortez also operated scheduled international passenger service to Mexico with the Fairchild F-27 on a routing of Ontario-San Diego-Guaymas-Mulege-Loreto.

== History ==
Air Cortez, also known as Air Cortez International, and as Tucan Air (Central America), was based at Ontario, California. Its cargo and passenger operations were based at Ontario Airport, and included scheduled and demand passenger and cargo service to most of the contiguous states, Jamaica, Panama, Mexico, Guatemala, Grand Bahama, Cuba, Honduras, Belize and the Channel Islands.

In 1986, the airline ceased operations.

== Fleet ==
It operated a mixed fleet of Beechcraft D-18, E-18S, G-18S and H-18S, Cessna 401, 402, 404, 411, 414 and 421, and Fairchild F-27 and F-27J aircraft.

== See also ==
- List of defunct airlines of the United States
