= Grand Canyon National Park Airport =

Airport in Coconino County, Arizona

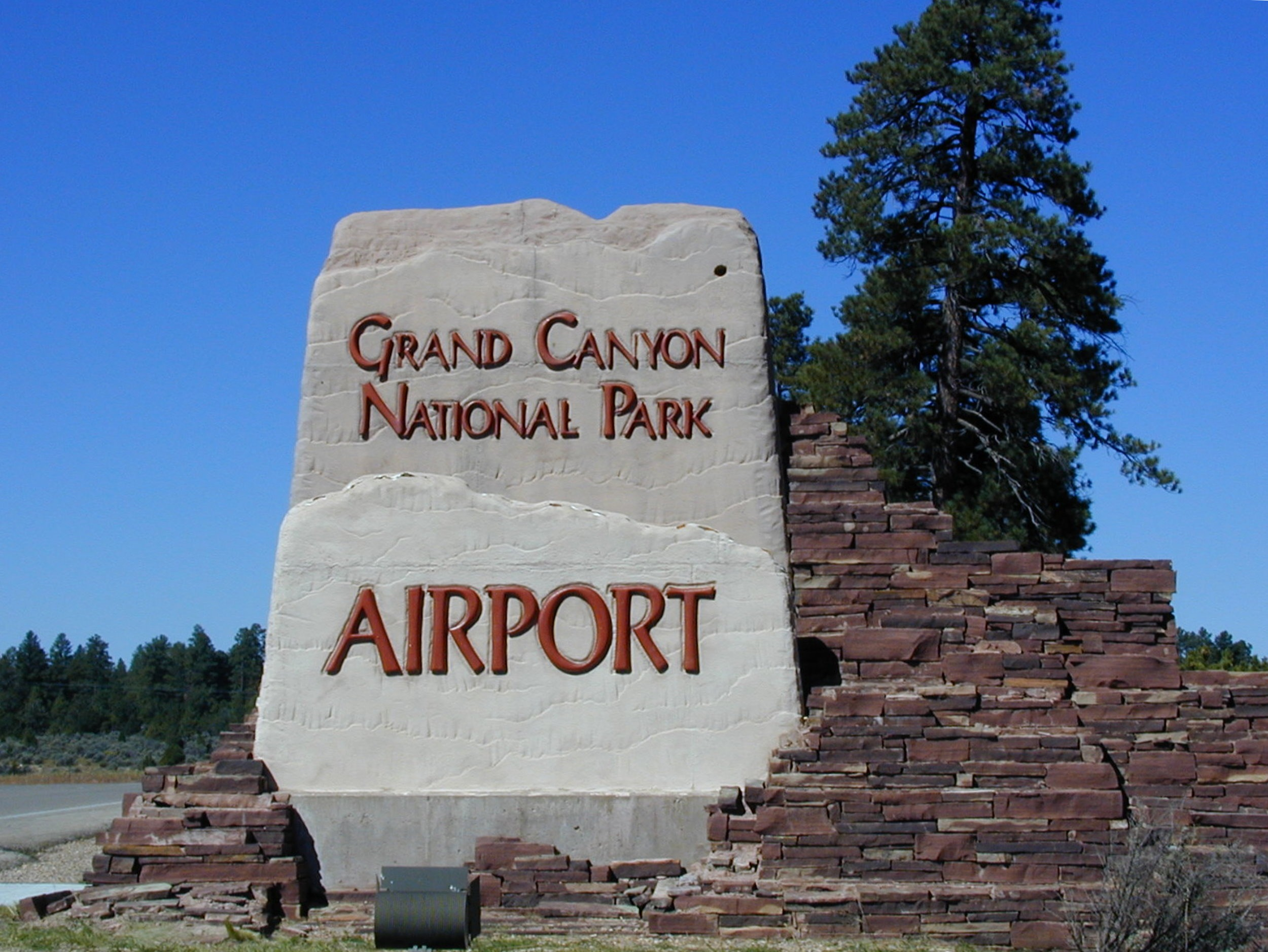
- IATA: GCN; ICAO: KGCN; FAA LID: GCN

Summary
- Airport type: Public
- Owner: State of Arizona
- Serves: Grand Canyon
- Location: Tusayan, Arizona
- Elevation AMSL: 6,609 ft (2,014 m)
- Coordinates: 35°57′08″N 112°08′49″W
- Website: http://www.azdot.gov/

Maps
- FAA airport diagram as of January 2021
- Location within Arizona Location within the United States

Runways
Direction	Length		Surface
Direction	ft	m	Surface
3/21	8,999	2,743	Asphalt

Statistics (2021)
- Aircraft operations: 41,161
- Based aircraft: 46
- Source: Federal Aviation Administration

Grand Canyon National Park Airport (IATA: GCN, ICAO: KGCN, FAA LID: GCN) is a state-owned public-use airport located in Tusayan, CDP in unincorporated Coconino County, Arizona, United States. It is near Grand Canyon National Park, 1 mile (0.87 nmi; 1.6 km) from the South Rim entrance of the Grand Canyon. The airport is primarily used for scenic tours and charter flights.

As per Federal Aviation Administration records, the airport had 294,436 passenger boardings (enplanements) in calendar year 2008 and 354,624 enplanements in 2007. According to the FAA's National Plan of Integrated Airport Systems for 2009–13, it is categorized as commercial service – primary.

== History ==
The site of the first official Grand Canyon Airport was a landing field authorized by the United States Forest Service and opened for commercial flights in 1928. It operated from 1928 to 1965 near Red Butte, in Coconino County, Arizona. The first airport was located 7.6 miles southwest of the present airport. The new airport first opened for business in October 1965. The new airport terminal was completed and formally dedicated on October 20, 1967.

Today, the airport is the fourth most active air carrier airport in Arizona, following Phoenix Sky Harbor International Airport, Tucson International Airport, and Phoenix-Mesa Gateway Airport. A number of air tour and commuter air carriers serve the airport.

The airport announced it would be temporarily closing in summer 2025 for a runway rehabilitation project.

== Facilities and aircraft ==
Grand Canyon National Park Airport covers an area of 859 acres (348 ha) at an elevation of 6,609 ft (2,014 m) above mean sea level. It has one runway designated 3/21 with an asphalt surface measuring 8,999 ft × 150 ft (2,743 m × 46 m).

For the 12-month period ending December 31, 2021, the airport had 41,161 aircraft operations, an average of 113 per day: 85% air tours, 14% general aviation, and 1% military. At that time there were 46 aircraft based at this airport: 8 single-engine, 8 multi-engine and 30 helicopter.

== Historical airline service ==
Grand Canyon National Park Airport had scheduled passenger jet service operated by several airlines at different times in the past including Air West, Hughes Airwest, Republic Airlines (1979–1986) and TriStar Airlines. Hughes Airwest operated Douglas DC-9-10 and McDonnell Douglas DC-9-30 jetliners to Las Vegas (LAS) and Phoenix (PHX) with continuing one-stop, direct service to Los Angeles (LAX) and Burbank (BUR) from 1970 through 1980. At one point, Hughes Airwest also operated Fairchild F-27 turboprop aircraft to Las Vegas and Phoenix with continuing, no change of plane service to Salt Lake City (SLC). Hughes Airwest merged into Republic Airlines in 1980 which continued to operate DC-9 jet flights into the airport. During the summer of 1982, Republic was operating two daily DC-9 flights nonstop to Las Vegas (LAS) as well as daily nonstop DC-9 service to Phoenix (PHX) and direct one-stop service daily to Burbank (BUR). By 1984, Republic had ceased all service into the airport.TriStar flew British Aerospace BAe 146-200 jets to Las Vegas (LAS) with direct one-stop service to LAX in 1995 and 1996.

Air West, the predecessor airline of Hughes Airwest, also operated Douglas DC-9 jets from the airport in the late 1960s in addition to flying services with Fairchild F-27 turboprops. Bonanza Air Lines, which merged with Pacific Air Lines and West Coast Airlines to form Air West in 1968, flew from the airport prior to the Air West service and operated Fairchild F-27 turboprops as well with direct service to Phoenix and Salt Lake City with a daily round trip routing of Phoenix – Prescott, AZ – Grand Canyon Airport – Page, AZ – Cedar City, UT – Salt Lake City. Bonanza then expanded their F-27 propjet service with nonstop flights to Las Vegas and Phoenix. A 1966 Bonanza Air Lines print ad announced the air carrier's new service at the airport, stating that Bonanza was "The only airline serving Grand Canyon" at the time.

Scenic Airlines provided frequent daily flights to Las Vegas from the late 1960s until the 2000s. Scheduled flights ended in 2008 but restarted in 2023 with one daily flight flown with a Cessna 208 Caravan.

The airport was also served by America West Airlines operating de Havilland Canada DHC-8 Dash 8 turboprop aircraft to Las Vegas and Phoenix from 1987 through 1991. Alpha Air, a commuter airline based in California that operated as Trans World Express (TWE) flying Beechcraft 1900C turboprops via a code sharing agreement with Trans World Airlines (TWA), also provided service with nonstop flights to Los Angeles (LAX) or Burbank (BUR) with the latter service continuing on to LAX. Inland Empire Airlines, another California-based commuter air carrier, operated nonstop flights to Los Angeles as well with Swearingen Metro propjets. Cochise Airlines, a commuter air carrier based in Arizona, served the airport with de Havilland Canada DHC-6 Twin Otter and Swearingen Metro turboprops and also Cessna 402 prop aircraft with flights to Phoenix, Tucson and other destinations in Arizona. In 1999 Sunrise Airlines was flying daily nonstop service between Phoenix and the airport with Beechcraft 1900C turboprops. Also in 1999, Scenic Air was operating daily nonstop service with a Grumman Gulfstream I propjet aircraft between Oakland, CA (OAK) and the airport.

A number of commuter air carriers also provided scheduled nonstop passenger service between Las Vegas (LAS) and Grand Canyon National Park Airport over the years. These airlines and the turboprop and prop aircraft they operated on the Las Vegas-Grand Canyon route are as follows with this information being taken from various Official Airline Guide (OAG) flight schedules from 1979 to 1999:

- Air Cortez – Beechcraft 18, Cessna 402, Fairchild F-27
- Air LA – British Aerospace BAe Jetstream 31
- Air Nevada – Cessna 402
- Air Resorts – Convair 580
- Air Vegas – Beechcraft 99, Cessna 402
- Eagle Canyon Airlines – Fokker F27
- Grand Airways – Cessna 402, Fairchild Swearingen Metroliner (Metro III aircraft). Grand Airways also operated McDonnell Douglas DC-9-30 jetliners into the airport on charter flights.
- Las Vegas Airlines – Piper Chieftain
- Nevada Airlines – Douglas DC-3, Martin 404
- Pacific National Airlines – Douglas DC-3
- Royal American Airways – Vickers Viscount
- Scenic Airlines – Cessna 402, de Havilland Canada DHC-6 Twin Otter, Fokker F27, Cessna 208 Caravan
- Silver State Airlines – Embraer EMB-110 Bandeirante

Airlines that operated scheduled passenger jet service in the past between Las Vegas and the airport included Air West, Hughes Airwest, Republic Airlines (1979–1986) and TriStar Airlines.

Wide body commercial jetliners including the Boeing 767-300 jetliner flown by Vision Airlines on charter service have operated into the airport in the past.

Air Force One, operated by the Presidential Air Lift Boeing VC-25 based on the Boeing 747-200B, brought President Biden to the Grand Canyon on August 8, 2023.

== Scenic air tours ==
Four companies operate scenic air tours over the Grand Canyon under FAR Part 135.

- Grand Canyon Airlines operates fixed-wing tours using customized Twin Otters and Cessna Caravans.
- WestWind Aviation Service operates fixed-wing tours using Cessna Skywagons and Cessna Caravans to and from Deer Valley Airport and Page Municipal Airport.
- Papillon Grand Canyon Helicopters operates rotor-wing tours using Bell 206s and Eurocopter EC130s.
- Maverick Helicopters operates rotor-wing tours using Eurocopter EC130s.

== Airport terminal tenants ==
There are currently four tenant businesses in the airport terminal.

- Grand Canyon Rental Adventures rents Polaris ATVs and camping gear.
- GC-Bikes rents electric bikes.
- Paragon Skydive offers tandem skydive services.
- WestWind Aviation Service offers fixed-wing scenic air tours over the Grand Canyon as well as service to Deer Valley Airport and Page Municipal Airport.

== Accidents at or near GCN ==
- On November 16, 1979, Nevada Airlines Flight 2504, a Martin 4-0-4 crashed after takeoff from GCN after a loss of power in the left engine and unwanted feathering of the prop and encountering a downdraft at the end of the runway. The aircraft collided with trees 7531 feet past the end of the runway and 2447 feet left of the extended centerline. The plane was destroyed by a post-crash fire, but there were no fatalities among the 41 passengers and three crew on board.
- On June 18, 1986, Grand Canyon Airlines Flight 6, a de Havilland Canada DHC-6 Twin Otter Vista Liner 300, collided in mid-air at an altitude of 6500 feet with a Helitech Bell 206 in the area of Tonto Plateau. All 18 passengers and two crew perished on the Twin Otter along with five occupants on the helicopter.
- On September 27, 1989, Grand Canyon Airlines Flight 5, a de Havilland Canada DHC-6 Twin Otter Vista Liner 300, crashed into trees after an attempted landing and go-around, killing eight passengers and two crew out of the 21 occupants on board.
- On September 8, 2019, Christopher Swales, a 55-year-old man from the United Kingdom, died during a tandem jump. Police blamed holes in the parachute.

== Climate ==
Grand Canyon National Park Airport has a warm-summer mediterranean continental climate (Köppen Dsb), bordering on a cold semi-arid climate (Köppen BSk).

Climate data for Grand Canyon NP Airport, Arizona, 1991–2020 normals: 6606ft (2014m)
Month	Jan	Feb	Mar	Apr	May	Jun	Jul	Aug	Sep	Oct	Nov	Dec	Year
Record high °F (°C)	70 (21)	69 (21)	77 (25)	82 (28)	91 (33)	97 (36)	99 (37)	96 (36)	95 (35)	85 (29)	74 (23)	66 (19)	99 (37)
Mean maximum °F (°C)	57.5 (14.2)	60.3 (15.7)	69.1 (20.6)	75.4 (24.1)	84.2 (29.0)	92.4 (33.6)	94.6 (34.8)	90.4 (32.4)	85.7 (29.8)	78.2 (25.7)	68.8 (20.4)	59.1 (15.1)	94.9 (34.9)
Mean daily maximum °F (°C)	43.9 (6.6)	46.9 (8.3)	54.5 (12.5)	61.2 (16.2)	70.7 (21.5)	82.5 (28.1)	84.9 (29.4)	82.8 (28.2)	76.9 (24.9)	65.6 (18.7)	53.8 (12.1)	44.2 (6.8)	64.0 (17.8)
Daily mean °F (°C)	29.9 (−1.2)	32.1 (0.1)	38.2 (3.4)	43.2 (6.2)	51.1 (10.6)	60.3 (15.7)	67.0 (19.4)	66.1 (18.9)	58.6 (14.8)	47.8 (8.8)	37.3 (2.9)	29.2 (−1.6)	46.7 (8.2)
Mean daily minimum °F (°C)	15.8 (−9.0)	17.2 (−8.2)	22.0 (−5.6)	25.3 (−3.7)	31.6 (−0.2)	38.0 (3.3)	49.0 (9.4)	49.4 (9.7)	40.4 (4.7)	30.0 (−1.1)	20.8 (−6.2)	14.1 (−9.9)	29.5 (−1.4)
Mean minimum °F (°C)	−7.4 (−21.9)	−4.5 (−20.3)	3.9 (−15.6)	12.7 (−10.7)	19.5 (−6.9)	27.0 (−2.8)	37.6 (3.1)	38.7 (3.7)	28.2 (−2.1)	17.2 (−8.2)	3.2 (−16.0)	−6.7 (−21.5)	−12.9 (−24.9)
Record low °F (°C)	−29 (−34)	−20 (−29)	−8 (−22)	3 (−16)	11 (−12)	20 (−7)	28 (−2)	29 (−2)	20 (−7)	−3 (−19)	−8 (−22)	−30 (−34)	−30 (−34)
Average precipitation inches (mm)	1.23 (31)	1.21 (31)	1.20 (30)	0.69 (18)	0.61 (15)	0.40 (10)	1.66 (42)	2.06 (52)	1.37 (35)	1.34 (34)	0.77 (20)	0.82 (21)	13.36 (339)
Average precipitation days (≥ 0.01 in)	6.2	6.6	5.7	5.1	3.5	2.1	11.2	11.4	6.3	4.9	3.7	5.9	72.6
Source 1: NOAA
Source 2: XMACIS2 (records & monthly max/mins)

== See also ==
- List of airports in Arizona
