= BLD =

BLD could refer to:

== Legal ==
- Black's Law Dictionary

== Stocks ==
- Boral, Australian Securities Exchange symbol BLD

== Transportation ==
- Baildon railway station, England; National Rail station code BLD
- Beresfield railway station, Australia; station code BLD
- Boulder City Airport, Nevada, United States; FAA location identifier BLD (closed c. 1988)
- Boulder City Municipal Airport, Nevada, United States; IATA airport code BLD (opened 1990)

== Other uses ==
- Bharatiya Lok Dal, a former Indian political party
- Blacklite District, an American rock band
- Blue Lambency Downward, an album by experimental band Kayo Dot
- BLD, a computer-building service by NZXT
- Black lung disease, a human disease caused by long-term exposure to coal dust
