= Grand Canyon Scenic Airlines =

Airline of the United States

| IATA | ICAO | Call sign |
|---|---|---|
| YR | SCE | SCENIC |
- Founded: 1967; 59 years ago
- Hubs: Boulder City Municipal Airport
- Parent company: Grand Canyon Airlines
- Headquarters: Paradise, Nevada
- Website: https://www.scenic.com/

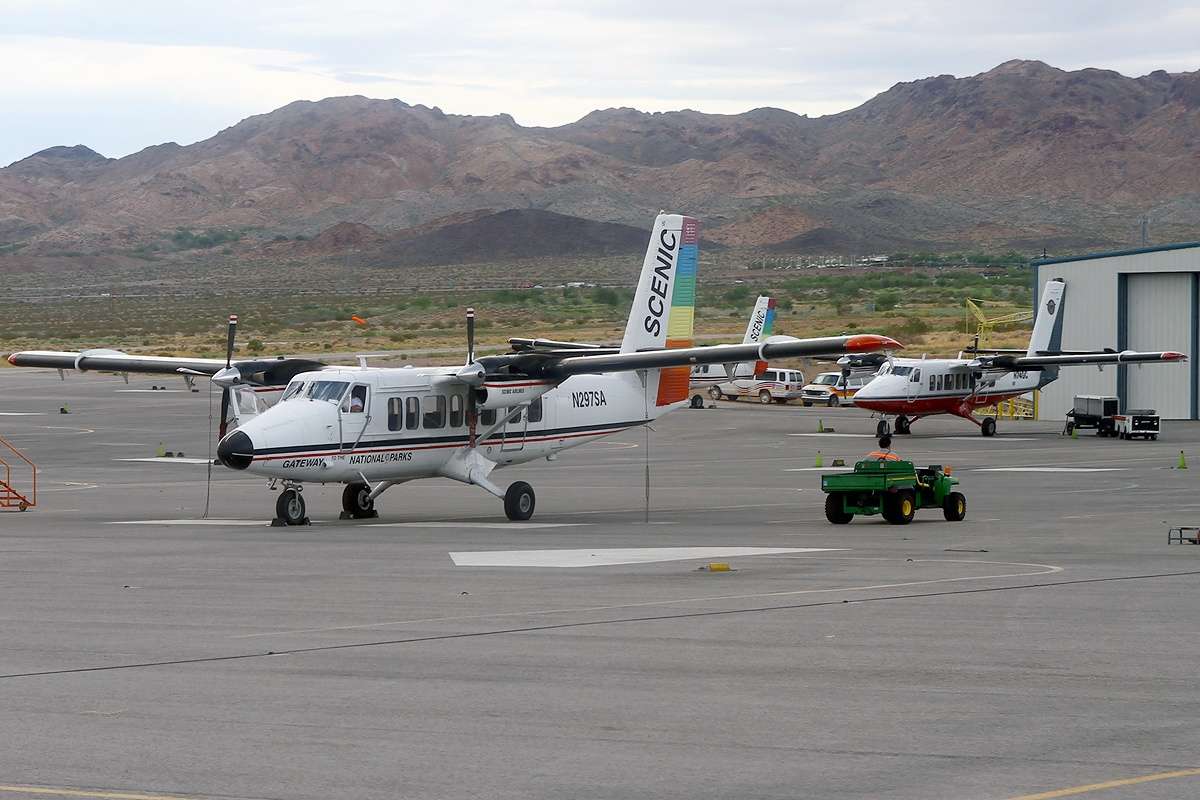
A Scenic Airlines de Havilland Canada DHC-6-300 Twin Otter/VistaLiner at Boulder Municipal Airport in 2011

Grand Canyon Scenic Airlines is an American air charter company, operating sightseeing flights under Part 135 of the US Federal Aviation Regulations. It is based in Paradise in the state of Nevada. Using a fleet of Cessna 208B Grand Caravan and de Havilland Canada DHC-6 Twin Otter high-wing light aircraft, it operates sightseeing flights of the Grand Canyon from several locations, including Boulder City Municipal Airport in Boulder City, Nevada. Scenic has been owned by Grand Canyon Airlines since 2008.

== History ==
Scenic Airlines was started by John and Elizabeth Seibold and their single engine Cessna airplane in North Las Vegas Airport in 1967. Between 1967 and 1993 Scenic Airlines grew to be one of the world's largest fixed-wing air tour operations. In 2000, John Seibold was recognized by the Las Vegas Review Journal as being one of the most influential businessmen in Las Vegas in the previous 100 years. In 1977, Scenic Airlines purchased the design and manufacturing rights to turboprop-powered conversions of the Cessna 402 and Cessna 414 from American Jet Industries. In 1983, the airline co-developed modifications to the de Havilland Canada DHC-6 Twin Otter to make it more suitable for use as an air tour airplane. The airline eventually moved to Las Vegas's Harry Reid International Airport (LAS), formerly known as McCarran International Airport.

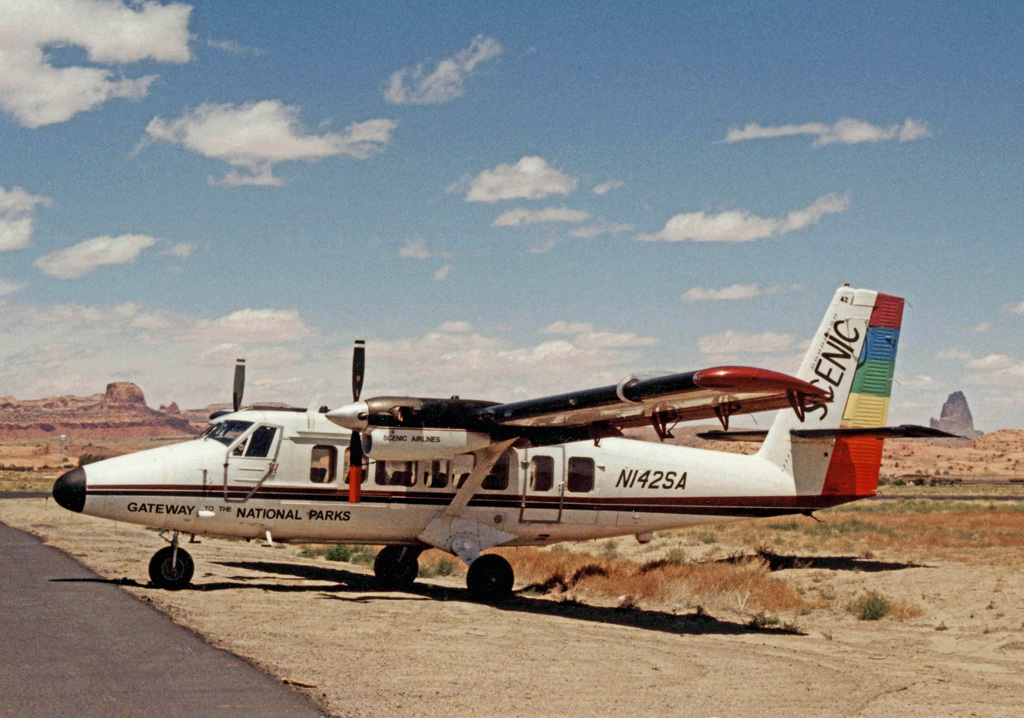
Scenic Airlines de Havilland Canada DHC-6 Twin Otter at Kayenta Airport in Arizona in 1997, with Monument Valley in the background

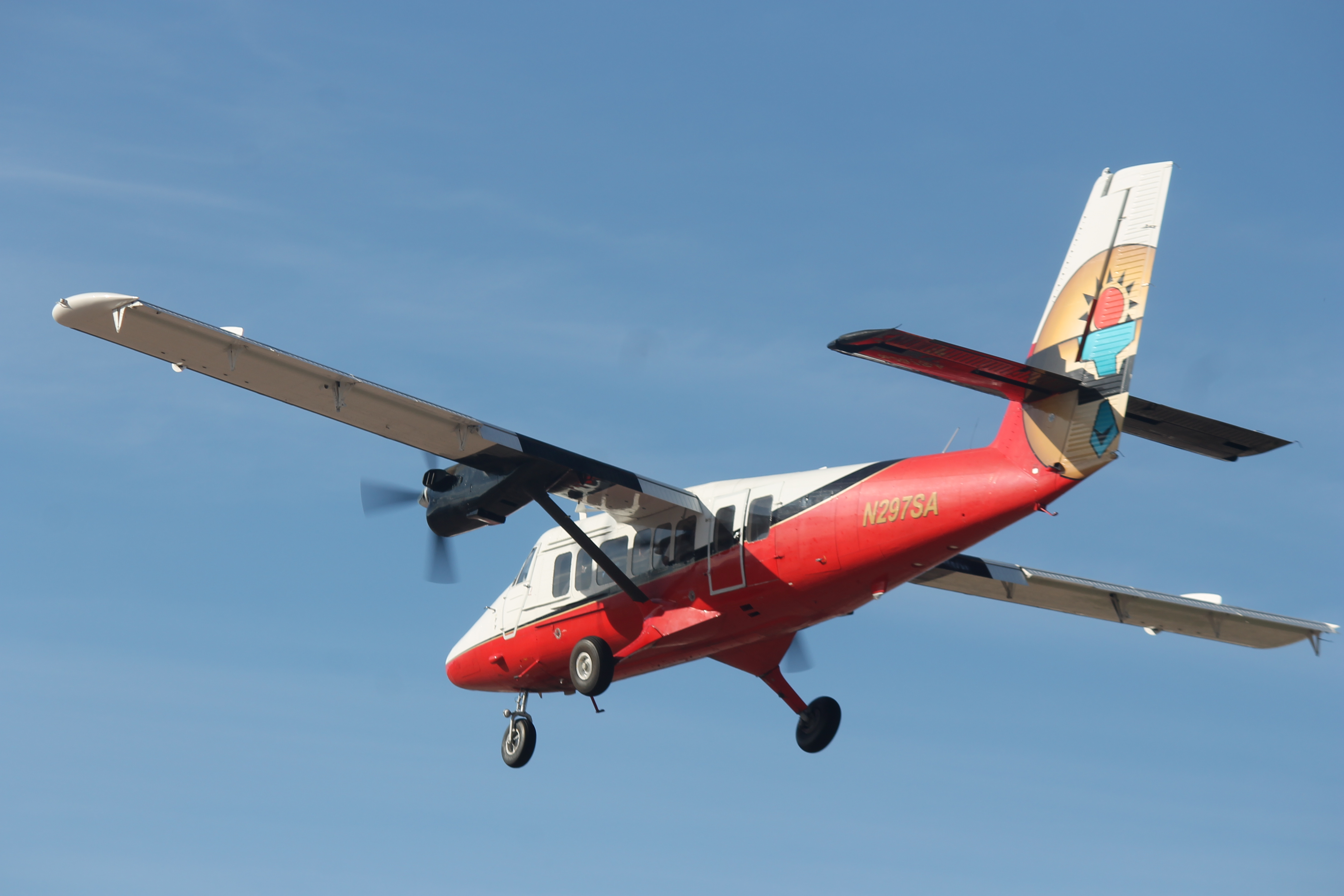
Twin Otter, 2017

Since the late 1960s, Scenic has operated scheduled passenger flights between Las Vegas and the Grand Canyon. Frequent daily flights were operated from the 1970's through the 1990's using Cessna 402's then transitioning to Twin Otters with extra large windows called Vistaliner's in 1984. In 1969 and 1970 Scenic flew a route from Salt Lake City to Cortez, Colorado, making stops at six other cities throughout southeast Utah. During the mid-1970s, Scenic operated from a hub in Las Vegas providing service to Grand Canyon, Page, and Yuma in Arizona, to Long Beach, Palm Springs, Carlsbad, El Centro, and Death Valley in California, and to Ely, and Elko, Nevada. The carrier flew Cessna 402, de Havilland Canada DHC-6 Twin Otter, and Fairchild Swearingen Metroliner aircraft.

During the 1980s Scenic operated a vintage Ford Trimotor aircraft on its flight seeing tours. This was the type aircraft operated by the original Scenic Airways of the late 1920s that also operated flight seeing service across the Grand Canyon.

In 1994 the Seibolds sold the airline to SkyWest Airlines and it continued to see growth until it merged with Eagle Canyon Airlines in 1999. From mid-1997 through mid-1998, Scenic provided scheduled service between Phoenix and Page, Arizona under a code-share agreement with Great Lakes Airlines. In 1999, Eagle Canyon Airlines was operating scheduled passenger service between Las Vegas (LAS) and Grand Canyon National Park Airport (GCN) using Fokker F27 Friendship turboprops. From 2002 through 2006, Scenic operated scheduled flights under the Essential Air Service (EAS) program from Las Vegas to Ely, Nevada, and to Merced and Visalia, California. In 2003 these flights were moved to arrive and depart from the North Las Vegas Airport (KVGT). The flights to Ely were later extended onto Elko, Nevada. Service was also flown to Palmdale, California in 2005. In the spring of 2006, citing rising fuel costs, the airline announced it would be ceasing scheduled passenger operations in order to focus on its sightseeing flights, thus abandoning its scheduled services using its fleet of three Beechcraft 1900 turboprop aircraft. Almost all of the scheduled service flights were then picked up by Air Midwest operating as US Airways Express.

On March 29, 2007, Scenic Airlines was sold to Grand Canyon Airlines and was subsequently renamed Grand Canyon Scenic Airlines. The airline continued to operate from the Boulder City airport providing services to Grand Canyon West, Grand Canyon, Page, Arizona, Monument Valley, Utah, and Rainbow Bridge, Utah now with Cessna 208 Caravan aircraft. At that time, Grand Canyon Scenic Airlines continued to operate sightseeing flight services to the Grand Canyon every day of the year.

On March 19, 2009, Grand Canyon Scenic Airlines moved its operations at the Boulder City airport into the company's new Boulder City Aerocenter, a 30,000 sq ft (2,800 m^{2}) terminal.

On January 5, 2025, new scheduled services between Phoenix and Safford, Arizona began, utilizing a nine-seat Cessna 208 Caravan (the maximum number of seats allowable under Part 135 of the Federal Aviation Regulations) through a local subsidy program. This was the first air service to Safford since the original Frontier Airlines left the city in the early 1960s. The service was terminated in September 2025.

== Destinations ==
The company operates sightseeing flights of the Grand Canyon and Monument Valley to a fixed schedule, to and from several locations:

- Arizona
  - Grand Canyon National Park Airport
  - Grand Canyon West Airport
  - Page Municipal Airport
- Nevada
  - Boulder City Municipal Airport
  - Harry Reid International Airport

=== Former scheduled service ===
The company briefly operated as a commuter airline. Between January and September 2025, it operated a scheduled service in Arizona between Phoenix and Safford using a nine-seat Cessna 208 Caravan, subsidized by a Minimum Revenue Guarantee (MRG). The service was terminated when MRG funds ran out.

== Fleet ==
The Grand Canyon Scenic Airlines fleet includes:

- Cessna 208B Grand Caravan
- de Havilland Canada DHC-6-300 Twin Otter

== Accidents ==
Since it was founded in 1966, Scenic Airlines has experienced at least five fatal accidents.

- On October 16, 1971 a Scenic Airlines Cessna 402 en route from North Las Vegas Airport to the Grand Canyon crashed while attempting to turn away from poor weather conditions on a sightseeing tour. The pilot and all nine passengers were killed.
- On November 30, 1975 a flight from Ely, Nevada to Elko, Nevada in a Scenic Cessna 402 crashed in poor weather due to improper IFR procedures. The pilot and the sole passenger were killed.
- On July 21, 1980 a Cessna 404 Titan departing the Grand Canyon Airport for Phoenix, Arizona experienced an engine failure on take-off due to foreign material, improper maintenance, and improper procedures. All eight persons aboard (seven passengers and one crew member) were killed.
- On September 20, 1996 a Cessna T207A operated by Scenic Airlines was being re-positioned at night from Grand Canyon, Arizona to St. George, Utah. For reasons undetermined, the airplane collided with the top of a 4,600-foot (1,400 m) bluff killing the sole occupant.
- On October 8, 1997 a Cessna 208B Grand Caravan operated by Scenic Airlines departed Montrose, Colorado for a flight to Page, Arizona. While climbing at the normal rate of climb to 15,400 feet (4,700 m), the airplane disappeared from radar. The wreckage was located among pine trees and exhibited evidence of a steep descent angle consistent with a stall or spin. All eight passengers and pilot were killed. The wreckage of the Cessna 208B Grand Caravan crash sits at the Embry-Riddle Aeronautical University, Prescott Arizona, Robertson Crash Laboratory, where it is used by the students of the crash investigation class taught by Safety Science Professor William D. Waldock.
