= Grand Canyon Airlines =

American sightseeing and charter service air carrier

IATA	ICAO	Call sign
YR	CVU	CANYON VIEW
- Commenced operations: October 3, 1927; 99 years ago
- AOC #: GCNA035A
- Subsidiaries: Papillon Airways; Grand Canyon Scenic Airlines
- Fleet size: 21
- Destinations: 4
- Headquarters: Tusayan, Arizona, U.S.
- Key people: Charles Bassett; Mike McComb; Craig Sanderson
- Employees: 600
- Website: grandcanyonairlines.com

Grand Canyon Airlines is a 14 CFR Part 135 air carrier headquartered on the grounds of Boulder City Municipal Airport in Boulder City, Nevada, United States. It also has bases at Grand Canyon National Park Airport and Page Municipal Airport, both in Arizona. It operates sightseeing tours and charter service over and around the Grand Canyon. Its headquarters and main operation center is Grand Canyon National Park Airport and Boulder City Municipal Airport.

== History ==
The airline was started in 1927 as Scenic Airways by J. Parker Van Zandt at Grand Canyon, Arizona with a Stinson SM-1 Detroiter and Ford Trimotor aircraft. On February 23, 1929, the opening day of the Arizona Biltmore Hotel, Scenic Airways dropped a wooden key on the roof of the hotel's ballroom. The key is on display above the fireplace of the Biltmore History Room.

Scenic Airways changed its name to Grand Canyon Airlines in 1930, and Grand Canyon Airlines is believed to be the world's oldest air tour company in continuous operations.

Grand Canyon Airlines introduced commercial airline service to Boulder City Airport (predecessor to the contemporary airport) on June 15, 1936.

Two Grand Canyon Airlines pilots were the first to spot the wreckage left by the 1956 Grand Canyon mid-air collision, between United and TWA aircraft. Pilots Henry and Palin Hudgen had been flying a scheduled service around the area at the time.

On March 29, 2007, Scenic Airlines was sold to Grand Canyon Airlines and was subsequently renamed Grand Canyon Scenic Airlines. The airline continued to operate from the Boulder City airport providing services to Grand Canyon West, Grand Canyon, Page, Arizona, Monument Valley, Utah, and Rainbow Bridge, Utah. At that time, Grand Canyon Scenic Airlines continued to operate sightseeing flight services to the Grand Canyon every day of the year.

On March 19, 2009, Grand Canyon Airlines moved its operations at the Boulder City airport into the company's new Boulder City Aerocenter, a 30,000 sq ft (2,800 m^{2}) terminal.

In 2024 GCSA received the "Best of Las Vegas" Gold award for best airline/charter in the city of Las Vegas.

== Destinations ==
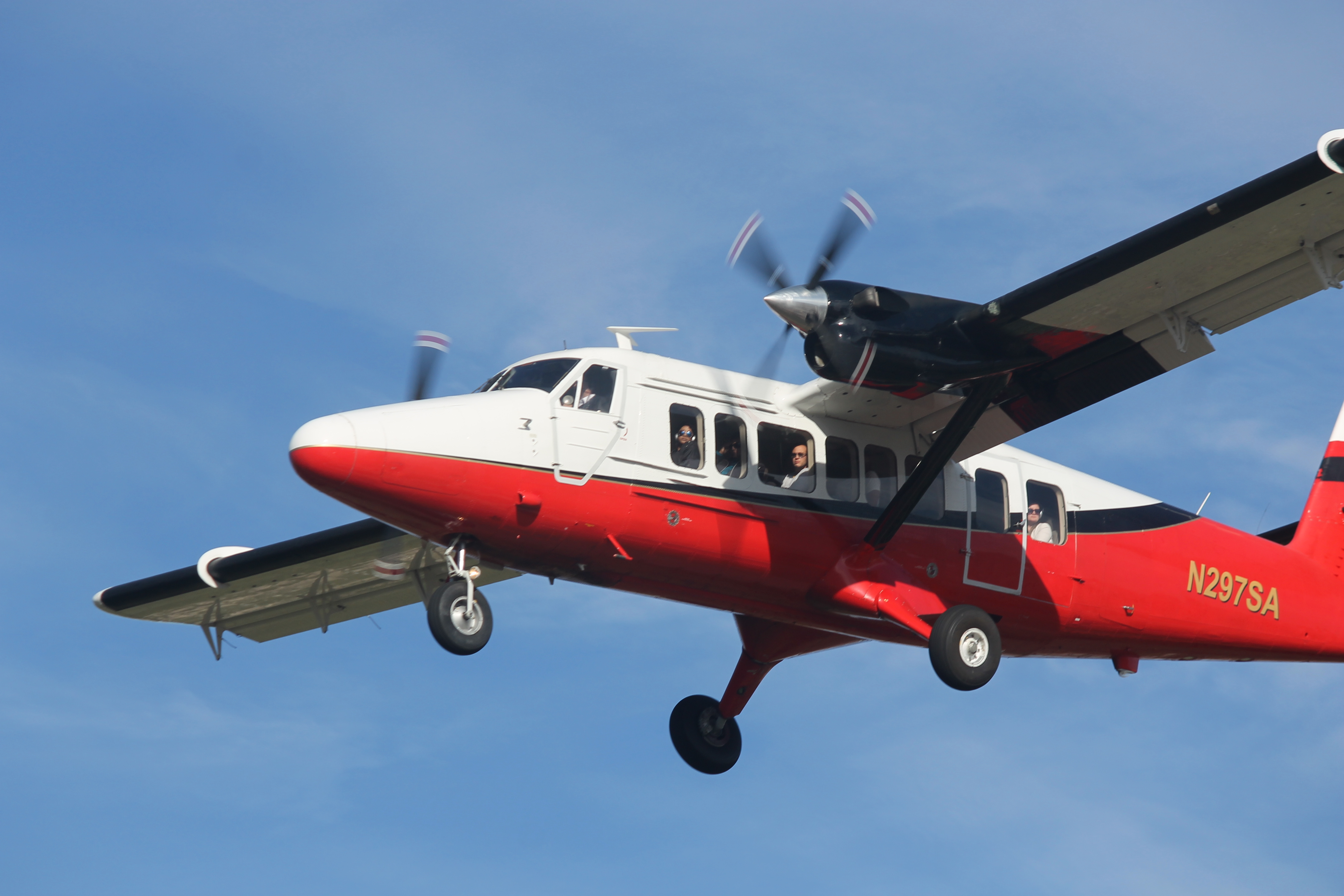
Grand Canyon Airlines De Havilland Canada DHC-6 Twin Otter

City	Airport	IATA Code	Destinations	Notes
Arizona
Grand Canyon West	Grand Canyon West Airport	GCW	Boulder City	
Grand Canyon South	Grand Canyon National Park Airport	GCN	Boulder City	
Page	Page Municipal Airport	PGA	Boulder City	
Phoenix	Phoenix Sky Harbor International Airport	PHX		
Nevada
Boulder City	Boulder City Municipal Airport	BLD	Grand Canyon West	
Boulder City	Boulder City Municipal Airport	BLD	Grand Canyon South	
Boulder City	Boulder City Municipal Airport	BLD	Page	

== Fleet ==
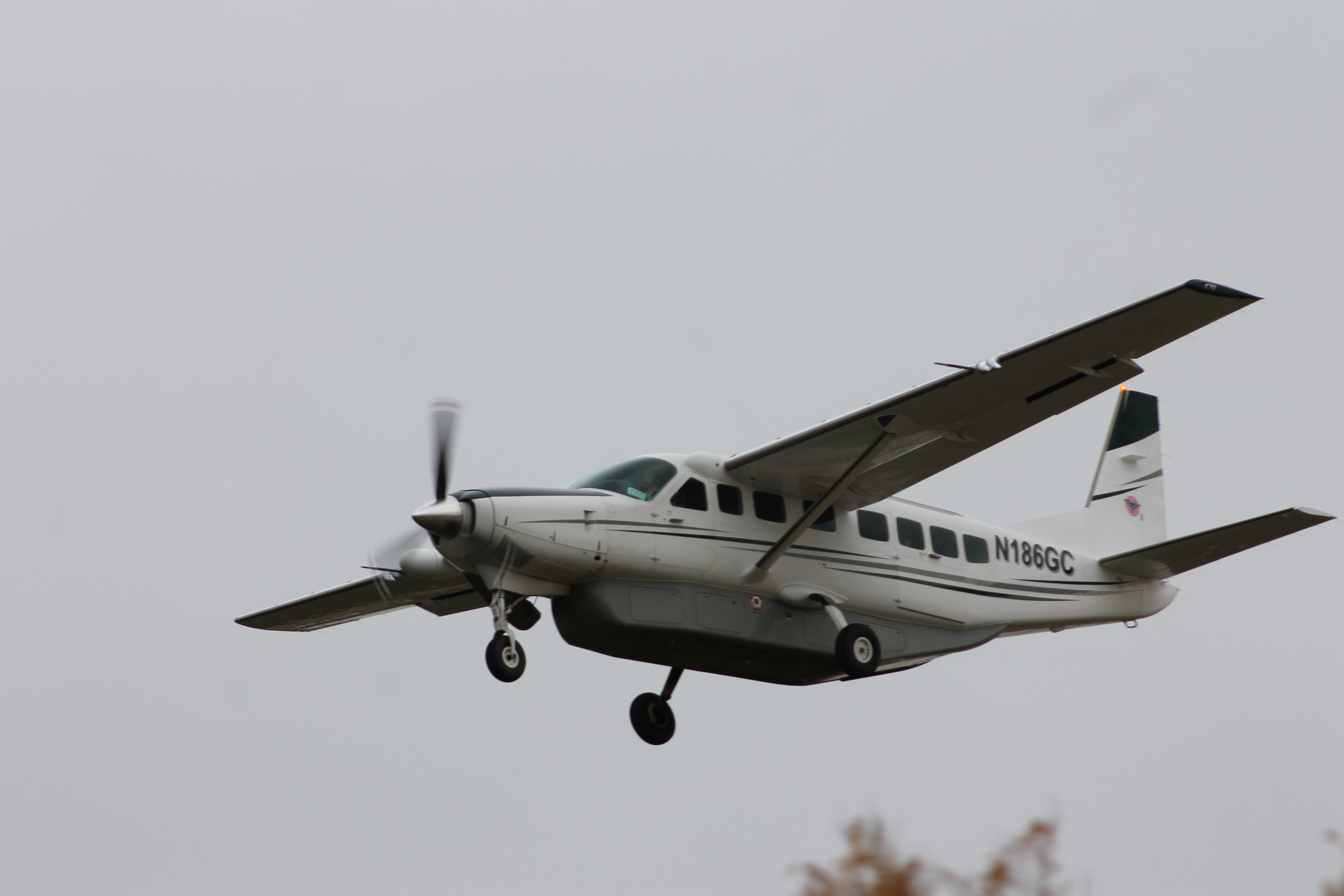
Grand Canyon Airlines Cessna 208B Grand Caravan

As of May 2020 the Grand Canyon Airlines fleet consists of the following aircraft:

Grand Canyon Airlines fleet
Aircraft	In service
De Havilland Canada DHC-6 Twin Otter	12 (as of August 2025)
Cessna 208B Caravan	8

== Accidents and incidents ==
- On June 18, 1986, Grand Canyon Airlines Flight 6, a de Havilland Canada DHC-6-300 (N76GC) of the airline collided with a Bell 206 JetRanger helicopter operated by Helitech Helicopters. Both aircraft were operating scenic air tour flights over the Grand Canyon when the collision occurred near Crystal Rapids. The collision killed all 25 people on both aircraft.
- On September 27, 1989, Grand Canyon Airlines Flight 5, a de Havilland Canada DHC-6-300 (N75GC) of the airline crashed while performing a go-around at Grand Canyon National Park Airport. Both crew members and eight of 19 passengers died.
