= Grand Canyon Skywalk =

Tourist attraction

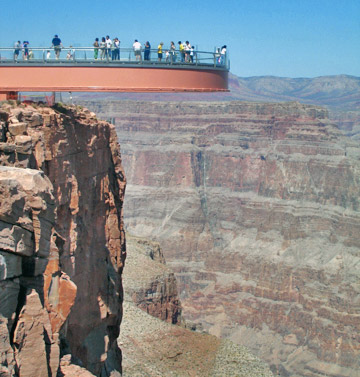
- Skywalk from Outside Ledge
- Coordinates: 36°0′44″N 113°48′40″W
- Carries: Pedestrian
- Locale: Grand Canyon West, Arizona, US
- Official name: Grand Canyon Skywalk
- Owner: Hualapai Tribe

Characteristics
- Design: Curved pedestrian cantilever bridge
- Material: Steel, glass
- Total length: 70 feet (21 m)
- Width: 10 feet 2 inches (3.10 m)

History
- Architect: Mark Ross Johnson
- Opened: March 28, 2007

Location
- Interactive map of Grand Canyon Skywalk

The Grand Canyon Skywalk is a horseshoe-shaped cantilever bridge with a glass walkway at Eagle Point in Arizona near the Colorado River, on the edge of a side canyon in the Grand Canyon West area of the main canyon. It opened as a tourist attraction in 2007, located outside the boundaries of the Grand Canyon National Park.

USGS topographic maps indicate the Skywalk's elevation as 4,770 ft (1,450 m) above sea level. The elevation of the Colorado River at the base of the canyon below is 1,160 ft (350 m). The vertical drop directly below the skywalk is 500 to 800 feet (150 to 240 m). The attraction is immediately north of Grand Canyon West Airport and about 75 miles (121 km) east of Las Vegas, Nevada, although nearly 130 miles (210 km) by car. The nearest city with a population greater than 10,000 people is Kingman, Arizona, about 50 miles (80 km) south.

Commissioned and owned by the Hualapai Indian tribe, the skywalk was unveiled March 20, 2007, and opened to the general public on March 28, 2007. The attraction's operators have reported over one million visitors per year several times, first occurring in 2015.

== Design and construction ==
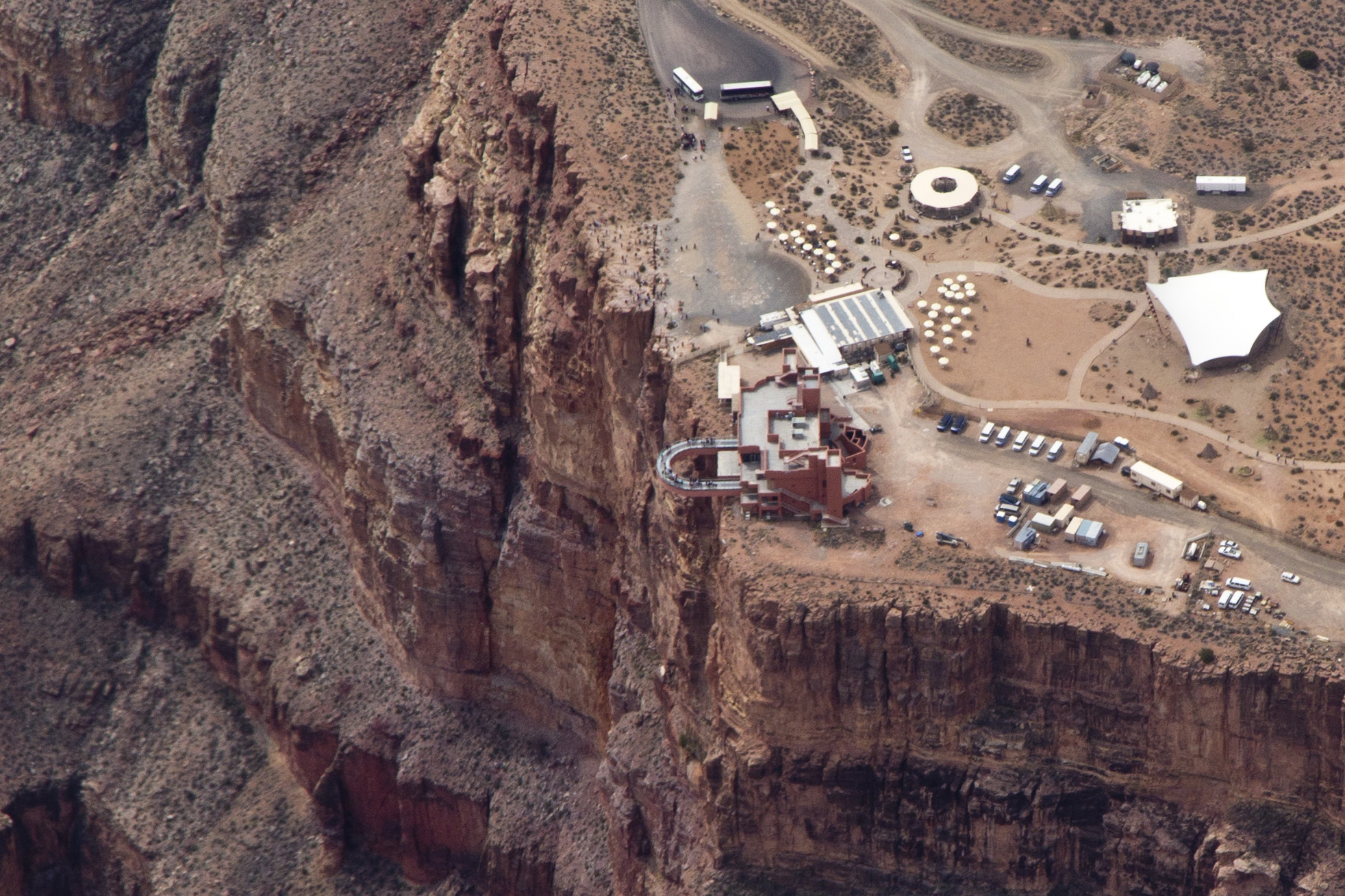
Aerial view of the Grand Canyon Skywalk

David Jin, an entrepreneur who had been involved with tourism and the Hualapai Nation for some time, had the idea of extending a platform out over the edge of the Grand Canyon. With the help of architect Mark Ross Johnson, that idea evolved into a rectangular walkway and eventually the U-shaped walkway constructed. Executive Construction Management, Las Vegas, NV., was the general contractor for the project, Company Owner and Project Manager, Scott Klempke.

The overall Skywalk width is 65 feet (20 m). The Skywalk length extending out from the post supports closest to the canyon wall is 70 feet (21 m). The outer and inner 32-inch-wide (810 mm) by 72-inch-deep (1,800 mm) bridge box beams are supported by eight 32-by-32-inch (810 mm × 810 mm) box posts having four posts on each side of the visitor center, once completed. The eight posts are anchored in pairs into four large concrete footings that are in turn anchored to the bedrock by ninety-six 2 1/2-inch-diameter (64 mm) high strength steel threaded rod rock anchors grouted 46 feet (14 m) deep into the rock.

The deck of the Skywalk has been made with four layers of Saint-Gobain Diamant low-iron glass with DuPont SentryGlas interlayer. Deck width is 10 feet 2 inches (3.10 m). The Skywalk glass sidings were made with the same glass as the deck, but fewer layers (two) bent to follow the walkway's curvature. The glass sidings are 5 feet 2 inches (1.57 m) tall and have been designed for high wind pressures.

The Skywalk deck was designed for a 100-pound-per-square-foot (490 kg/m^{2}) live load along with code-required seismic and wind forces. The foundation can withstand an 8.0 magnitude earthquake within 50 miles (80 km). Fine-tuning of the project occurred after a wind loading and pedestrian induced vibration analysis. Two tuned mass dampers were installed inside the outer box beam as well as one inside the inner box beam at the furthest extension of the Skywalk to reduce pedestrian footfall vibration. The walkway could carry 822 people that weigh 200 pounds (91 kg) each without overstress, but maximum occupancy at one time is 120 people.

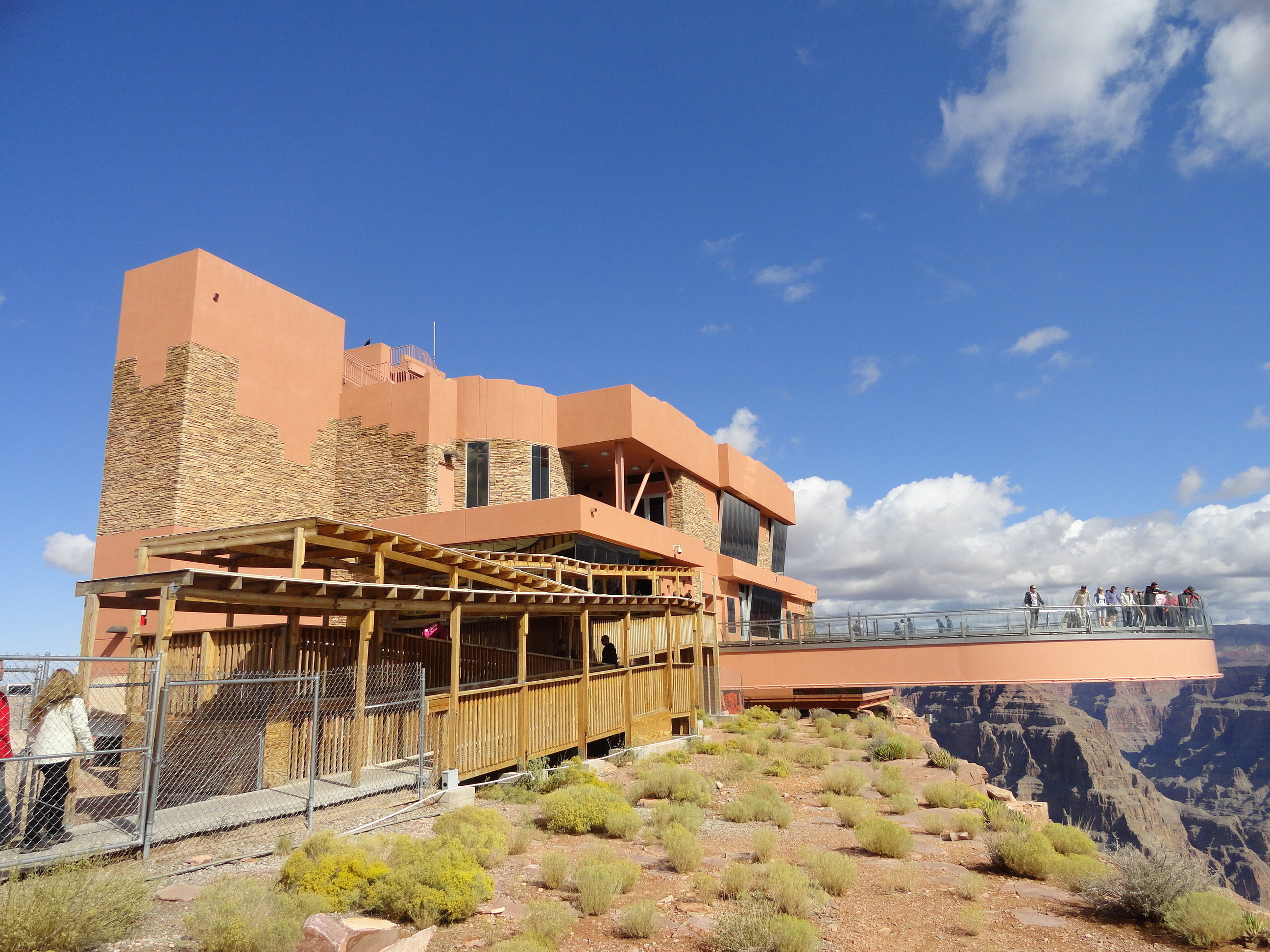
Closer view of the entrance building to skywalk

The Skywalk was assembled on top of the canyon wall in line with its final placement and moved into final position by a jack and roll rig. The Skywalk infrastructure itself weighs a little over 1,000,000 pounds (450,000 kg) without counterweights but including the tuned mass dampers, railing hardware, glass rails, glass deck and steel box beams. At the time of roll-out, the Skywalk weighed approximately 1.6 million pounds (730,000 kg). The process was completed in two days.

Astronauts Buzz Aldrin and John Herrington attended the opening ceremony on March 20, 2007.

A National Geographic documentary film on the construction of the Skywalk has been published.

== Cornerstone of a larger plan ==
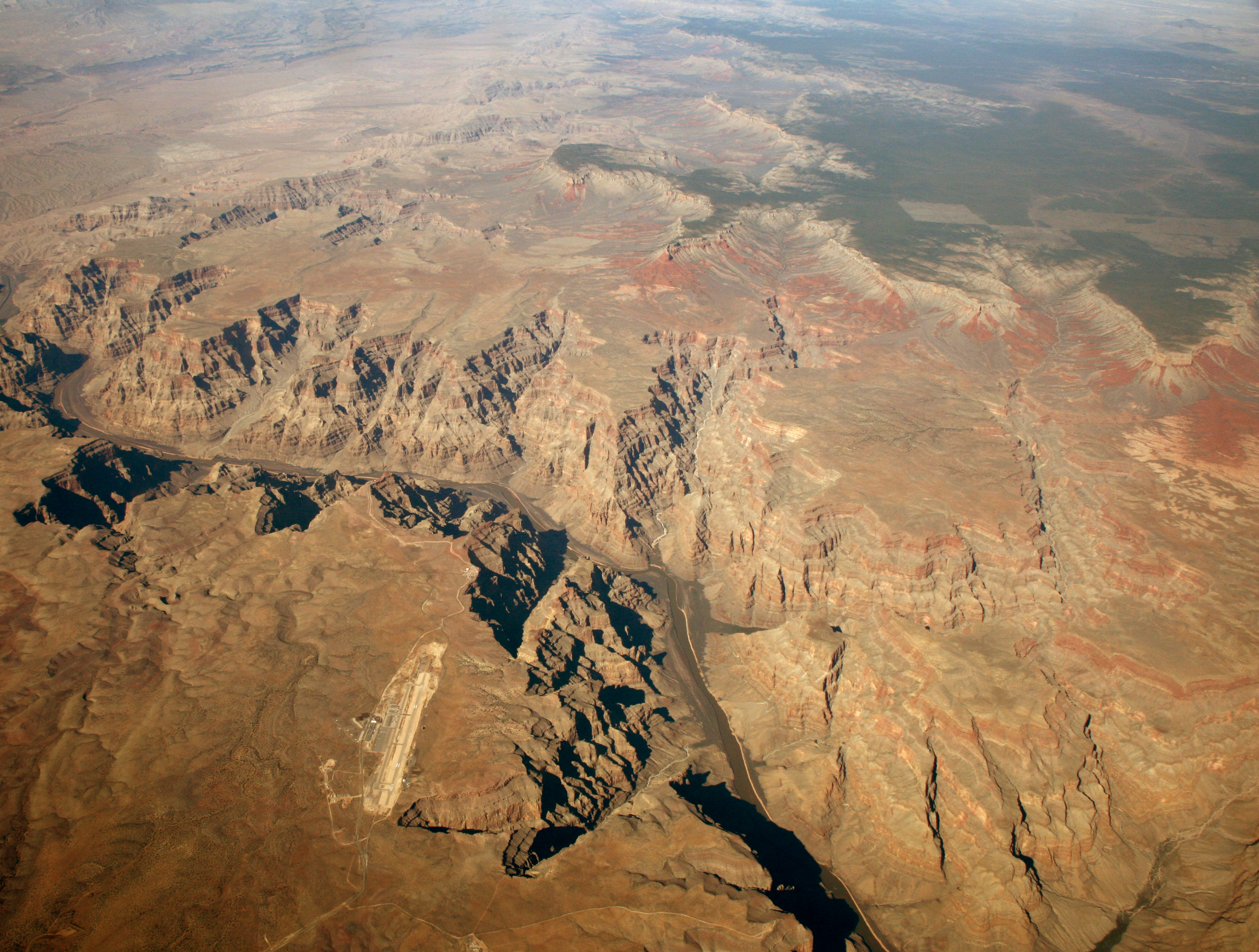
Aerial view: Grand Canyon West Airport at left center. Grand Canyon National Park lands (top), north of the Colorado River.

According to Hualapai officials, the cost of the Skywalk was $30 million. Plans for the Grand Canyon Skywalk complex include a museum, movie theater, VIP lounge, gift shop, and several restaurants including a high-end restaurant called The Skywalk Café where visitors will be able to dine outdoors at the canyon's rim. The Skywalk is the cornerstone of a larger plan by the Hualapai tribe, which it hopes will be the catalyst for a 9,000-acre (36 km^{2}) development to be called Grand Canyon West; it would open up a 100-mile (160 km) stretch along the canyon's South Rim and include hotels, restaurants, a golf course, casinos, and a cable car to ferry visitors from the canyon rim to the Colorado River, which has been previously inaccessible.

== Controversy ==
=== Hualapai ===
Opponents within the tribe view the project as disturbing sacred ground. Supporters within the tribe counter that it is an opportunity to generate much-needed cash to combat serious problems that plague the small 2,000-resident reservation, including a 50% unemployment rate, widespread alcoholism, and poverty. Other tribal members are happy with the Skywalk, but they have expressed concern over future development. They are also concerned about the potential lack of sustainability because the water used in the development is not taken from the Colorado River but trucked in from elsewhere. Effective February 7, 2012, certain members of the Hualapai Tribal Council, without prior notice, seized control of the Skywalk which was built and previously run by Grand Canyon Skywalk Development (GCSD), a Las Vegas, Nevada, corporation. GCSD is no longer in charge of daily operations at the Skywalk. GCSD was awarded $28 million in damages by an arbitration board, which was upheld in U.S. District Court in February 2013.

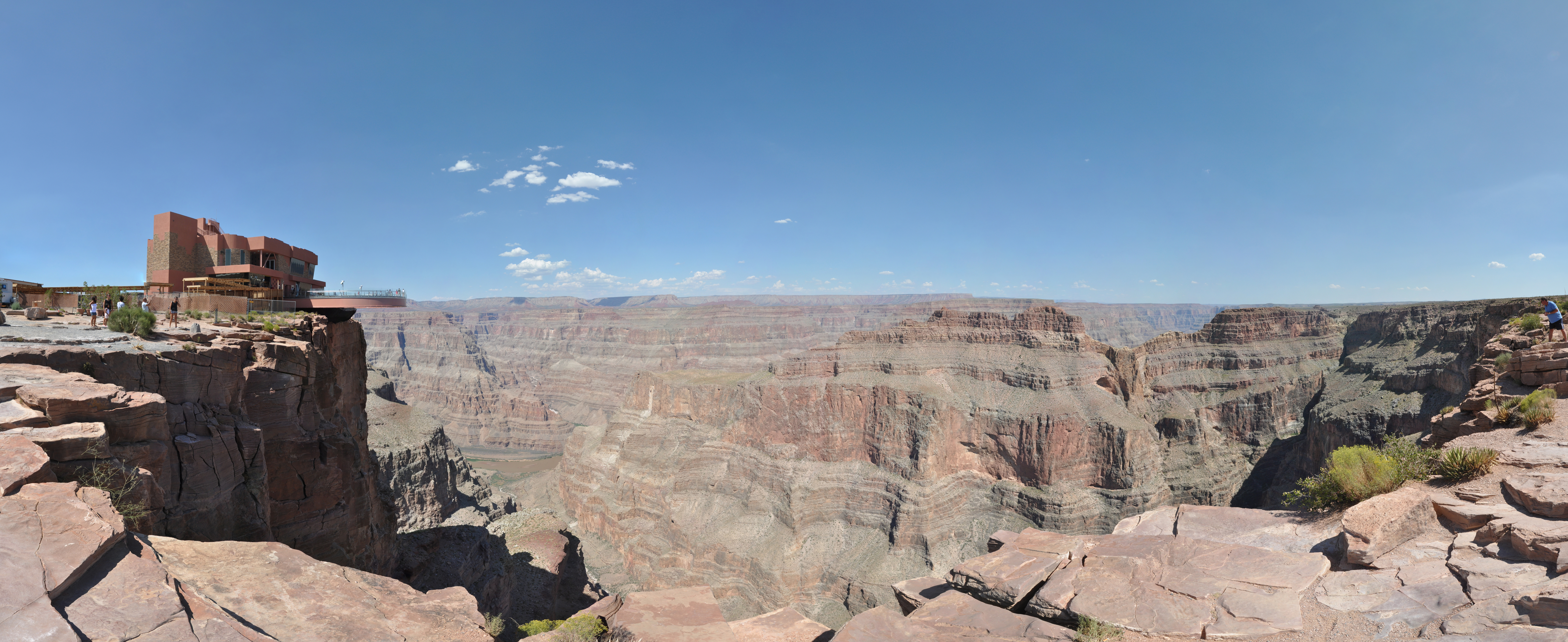
View of the Skywalk and the surrounding canyon

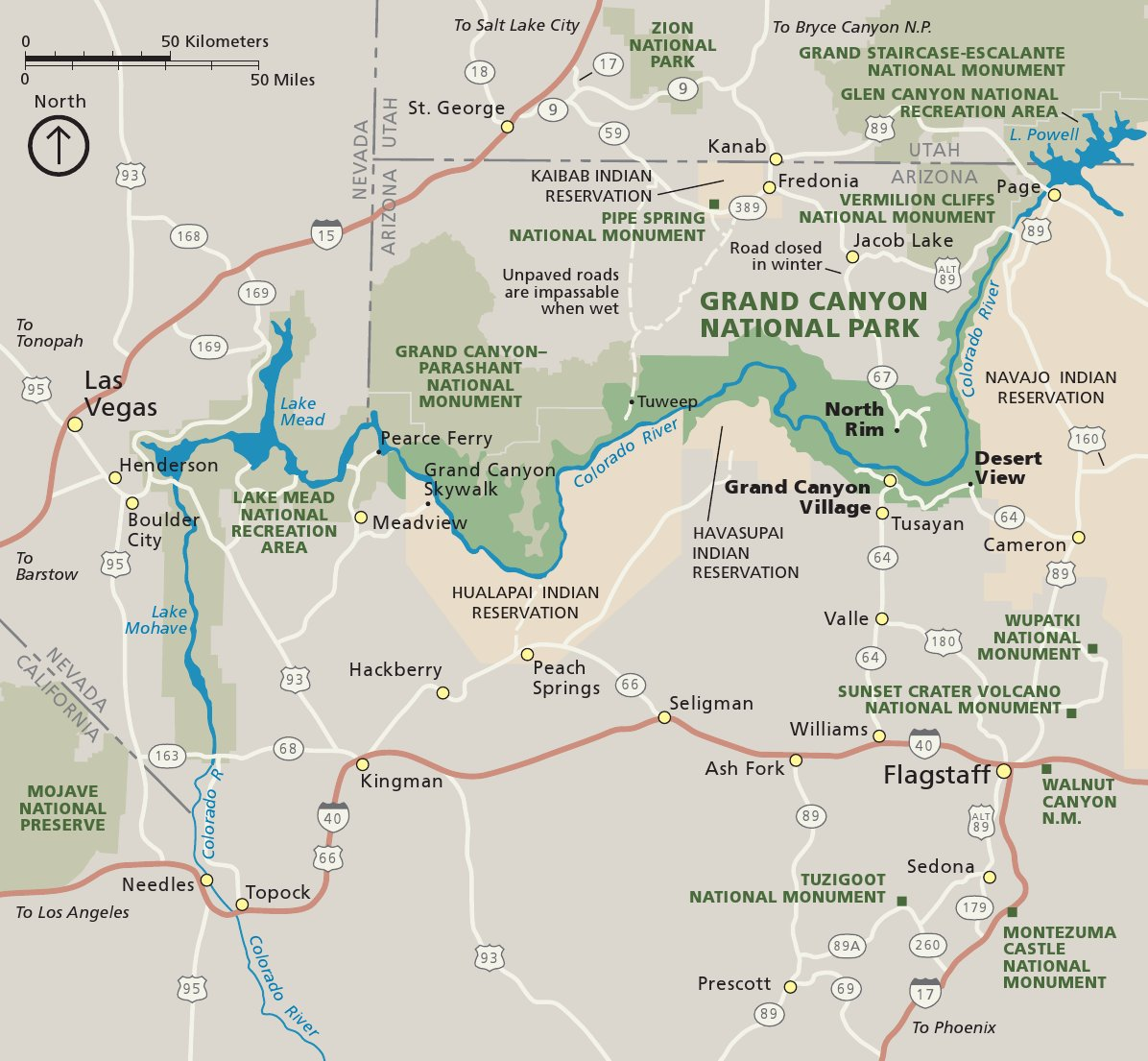
Grand Canyon regional map

=== Environmentalists ===
People outside of the tribe, including Arizona environmental groups and former National Park Service officials, have expressed concern about the project's obtrusiveness in the natural environment, considering it a defacement of a national treasure. Former Grand Canyon National Park superintendent Robert Arnberger has described the development as "the equivalent of an upscale carnival ride," adding that he has been unable to resolve "the apparent conflict between the tribe's oft-stated claim that there is no better caregiver and steward of the Grand Canyon than the tribe, and their approach to the land – which is based on heavy use and economics." Tribal leaders counter that the five million people a year who visit the National Park portion are already overburdening an area and, further, that the tribe needs financial income. As of 2013, the Skywalk attracted approximately 370,000 visitors per year. In 2015, the attraction drew a million visitors in a year for the first time.

== Tourism, access, and protection ==
Access to the Skywalk can be made from Las Vegas, Nevada, in the north or Kingman, Arizona, in the south, via Highway 93. The routes converge (at CR 7/Buck and Doe Rd) near Diamond Bar Road.
