= Grand Canyon Escalade =

Proposed entertainment complex

Coordinates: 36°13′31″N 111°47′40″W

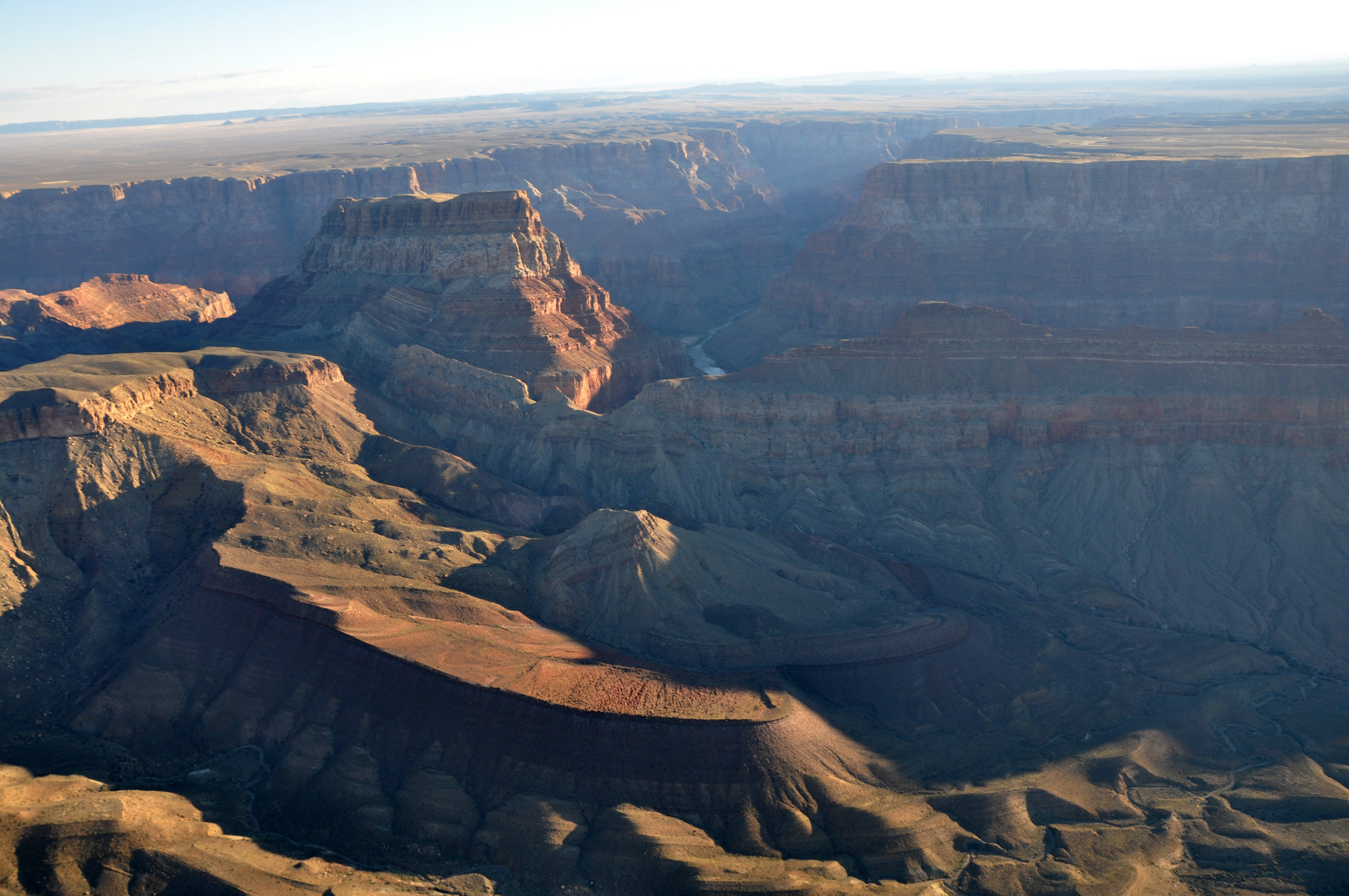
Image of the confluence of the two rivers, with the planned development to be on the left hand side of the rim

The Grand Canyon Escalade was a proposed entertainment complex on the eastern rim of the Grand Canyon within the boundaries of the Navajo Nation.

Located to the north of the confluence of the Colorado River and the Little Colorado River, the project was touted by Scottsdale based developers as a way to bring money to the tribe. There was significant opposition to the project from those who wanted to preserve the area. Strong opposition also came from members of the Navajo Nation from the surrounding region who cited numerous ecological, economic, and spiritual concerns with the proposal, as well as ethical concerns with the background of the developers. The Hopi expressed complete opposition to the project, citing the sacredness of the area surrounding Little Colorado River confluence, and the National Park Service opposed the development.

Following a petition, a special session of the Navajo Nation Council convened in October 2017 voted 16–2 against the project.

== See also ==
- Grand Canyon West
