= Boulder City Municipal Airport =

Public airport in Clark County, Nevada, US

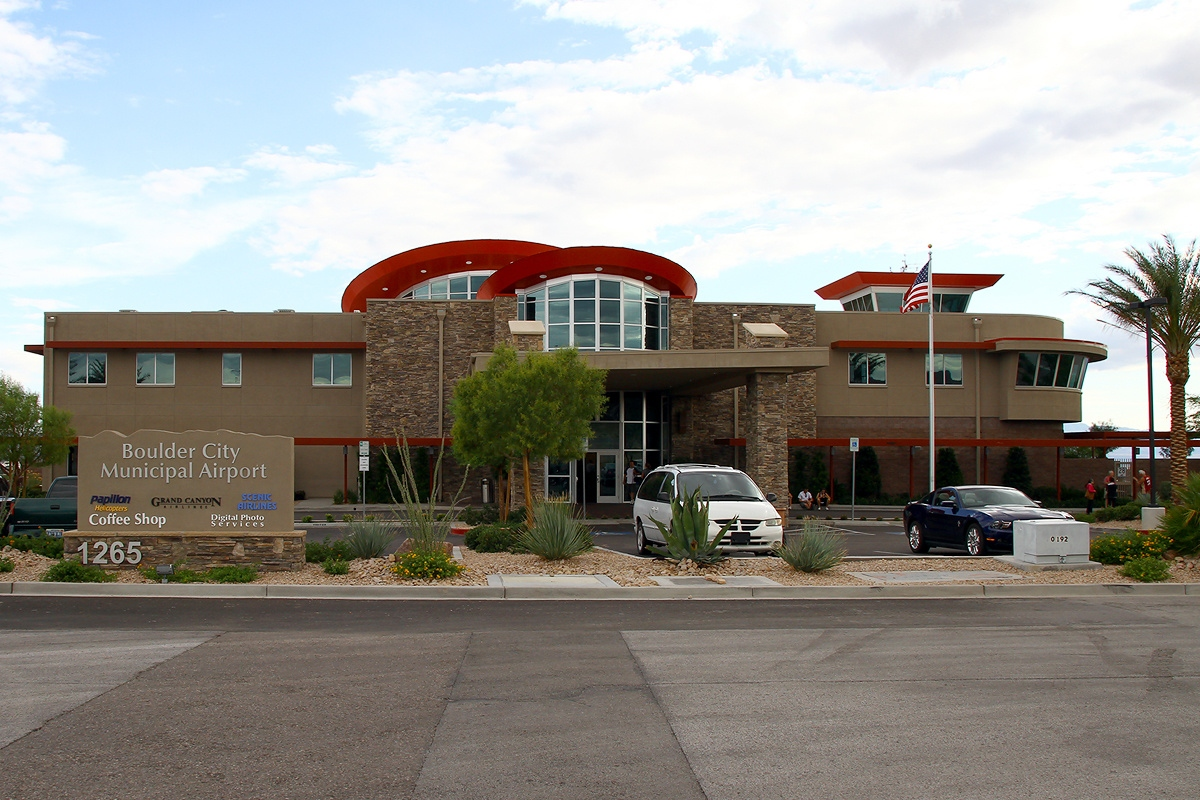
- IATA: BLD; ICAO: KBVU; FAA LID: BVU

Summary
- Airport type: Public
- Owner: Boulder City Municipality
- Serves: Boulder City, Nevada
- Opened: July 2, 1990; 36 years ago
- Elevation AMSL: 2,203 ft (671 m)
- Coordinates: 35°56′50″N 114°51′37″W
- Website: flybouldercity.com

Map
- Location of airport in Nevada BLD (the United States)

Runways
Direction	Length		Surface
Direction	ft	m	Surface
9/27	5,103	1,555	Asphalt
15/33	3,852	1,174	Asphalt

Statistics (2023)
- Aircraft operations (year ending 5/18/2023): 44,251
- Based aircraft: 265
- Source: Federal Aviation Administration

Boulder City Municipal Airport (IATA: BLD, ICAO: KBVU, FAA LID: BVU, formerly 61B) is a public use airport located one nautical mile (2 km) southwest of the central business district of Boulder City, in Clark County, Nevada, United States. In operation since 1990, it is owned by the Boulder City Municipality.

According to the FAA, this airport had 300,553 passenger boardings (enplanements) in calendar year 2008, 194,838 in 2009, and 169,923 in 2010. The National Plan of Integrated Airport Systems for 2011–2015 categorized it as a primary commercial service airport.

Although many U.S. airports use the same three-letter location identifier for the FAA and IATA, Boulder City Municipal Airport is assigned BVU by the FAA and BLD by the IATA (which assigned BVU to Beluga Airport in Beluga, Alaska).

== History ==
Boulder City Municipal Airport opened on July 2, 1990. It replaced Boulder City Airport, which operated from 1933 into the 1980s. The prior airport was located north of the current airport, much closer to U.S. Route 93.

On March 19, 2009, the Boulder City Aerocenter, a new 30,000 sq ft (2,800 m^{2}) terminal, opened to service Papillon Grand Canyon Helicopters, Grand Canyon Airlines and Grand Canyon Scenic Airlines.

== Facilities and aircraft ==
Boulder City Municipal Airport covers an area of 530 acres (214 has) at an elevation of 2,203 feet (671 m) above mean sea level. It has two runways with asphalt surfaces: 9/27 is 5,103 by 75 feet (1555 x 23 m) and 15/33 is 3,852 by 75 feet (1,174 x 23 m).

For the 12-month period ending May 18, 2023, the airport had 44,521 aircraft operations, an average of 122 per day: 55% air taxi, 44% general aviation, and <1% military. At that time, there were 265 aircraft based at this airport: 198 single-engine, 32 helicopters, 22 multi-engine, 10 ultralights, 2 military, and 1 glider.

== Airlines and destinations ==
There are no scheduled airline services to or from the airport.

Boulder City Municipal Airport is a base for air charter companies offering sightseeing tours of the Grand Canyon, using fixed-wing light aircraft and helicopters. Destinations include Grand Canyon National Park Airport, Grand Canyon West Airport and Page Municipal Airport. Tour operators include Grand Canyon Airlines and its sister company Grand Canyon Scenic Airlines, Papillon Grand Canyon Helicopters, Las Vegas Helicopters and 5 Star Helicopter Tours.

=== Statistics ===
Carrier shares: September 2023 - August 2024
Carrier	Passengers (arriving and departing)
Grand Canyon Scenic Airlines	630(100%)

Top destinations: September 2023 - August 2024
Rank	Destination	Passengers
1	Peach Springs Airport (DQR)	330

== See also ==
- List of airports in Nevada
