= Safford Regional Airport =

Airport in Graham County, Arizona

- IATA: SAD; ICAO: KSAD; FAA LID: SAD

Summary
- Airport type: Public
- Owner: City of Safford
- Serves: Safford, Arizona
- Elevation AMSL: 3,179 ft / 969 m
- Coordinates: 32°51′12″N 109°38′06″W

Map

Runways
Direction	Length		Surface
Direction	ft	m	Surface
12/30	6,006	1,831	Asphalt
8/26	4,800	1,463	Asphalt

Helipads
Number	Length		Surface
Number	ft	m	Surface
H1	72	22	Concrete

Statistics (2009)
- Aircraft operations: 8,690
- Based aircraft: 32
- Source: Federal Aviation Administration

Safford Regional Airport (IATA: SAD, ICAO: KSAD, FAA LID: SAD) is in Safford, Graham County, Arizona, United States, 3 miles (2.6 nmi; 4.8 km) east of downtown Safford; the airport is owned by the Safford municipal government. The FAA's National Plan of Integrated Airport Systems for 2009–2013 categorizes it as a general aviation facility. It is the only paved airport in Graham County.

== History ==
The Civilian Pilot Training Airport or Wickersham Airport was 3 miles (4.8 km) south of Safford, where the fairgrounds are today. Safford Regional Airport as we know it was built as a military auxiliary field during World War II. On November 11, 1941, a 20-year lease for the airport site was given to the City of Safford by the U.S. Government. By March 8, 1946, the airport site was transferred to the City of Safford permanently.

- 1949: Land acquisition, construction of access road and cattle guard, fencing.
- 1950: Installation of medium intensity runway lighting (MIRL) on NE/SW runway, modification of lighting service and control segmented circle and lighted wind cone, construction of curbs for auto parking, fencing. Installation of 10-inch (250 mm) clear- green rotating beacon.
- 1952: Construction of water supply and distribution system, convert single phase electrical system to 3 phase.
- 1974: Overlay and marking of Runway 12/30 (approximately 4,800 feet (1,500 m) by 75 feet) and taxiway (approximately 2,800 feet (850 m) by 40 feet); pave aircraft parking apron (approximately 22,000 sq yd).
- 1981: Installation of MIRL; 12/30. Construction of parking apron.
- 1983: Construction of medium intensity taxiway lighting (MITL), place guidance signs and mark parallel taxiway (approximately 370 feet (110 m) by 35 feet), install Visual Approach Slope Indicators (VASI-2) and runway edge identifier lights (REIL), runway ends 12/30. Grading, drainage and surfacing of taxiway 12/30.
- 1986: Slurry sealing of runway 12/30.
- 1987: Reconstruction and marking of runway 8/26 (approximately 75 feet (23 m) by 4,800 feet), mark taxiway hold lines and grade 200 by 125 feet (38 m) at both ends of the runway.
- 1992: Extension of taxiway B to runway 12/30 eastern end, crack seal and overlay existing taxiway A and B, install MITL along Taxiway C and extend taxiway B.
- 1994: Reconstruction of runway 12/30 excluding recent extension and construction of terminal parking lot.
- 1995: Paving of auto parking lot.
- 1996: Reconstruction and expansion of existing terminal apron.
- 1997: ASOS Weather Station installed.
- 1998: Construction of heliport, providing of runway 8/26 pavement and airport fencing.

== Airline service history ==
The original Frontier Airlines began service to Safford in 1950 with Douglas DC-3 aircraft. Safford was a stop on a route between Phoenix and El Paso which also made stops at Globe/Miami and Clifton/Morenci, Arizona as well as at Lordsburg, Deming, and Las Cruces, New Mexico. By 1956 the route was redirected from Phoenix to Albuquerque stopping in Tucson, Safford, Clifton, and Silver City in New Mexico. Frontier's service ended in 1964. The airport was served again briefly in 1974 and 1975 by Cochise Airlines with flights to Tucson and Phoenix using a Cessna 402 aircraft.

Grand Canyon Scenic Airlines started serving the airport in January 2025, with flights to Phoenix Sky Harbor International Airport on a Cessna 208 Caravan. The service was suspended in September 2025 due to the depletion of the local funding that supported this service. The airline operated 358 flights to Phoenix carrying 718 passengers, an average of 2 passengers per departure.

== Facilities ==
The airport covers 630 acres (250 ha) at an elevation of 3,179 feet (969 m). It has two asphalt runways: 12/30 is 6,006 by 100 feet (1,831 x 30 m) and 8/26 is 4,800 by 75 feet (1,463 x 23 m). It has one concrete helipad, H1, 72 by 72 ft (22 x 22 m).

In the year ending March 31, 2009 the airport had 8,690 aircraft operations, average 23 per day: 93% general aviation, 7% military and <1% air taxi. 32 aircraft were then based at this airport: 56% single-engine, 41% multi-engine and 3% helicopter.

== See also ==
- List of airports in Arizona
