= Page Municipal Airport =

Airport in Coconino County, Arizona

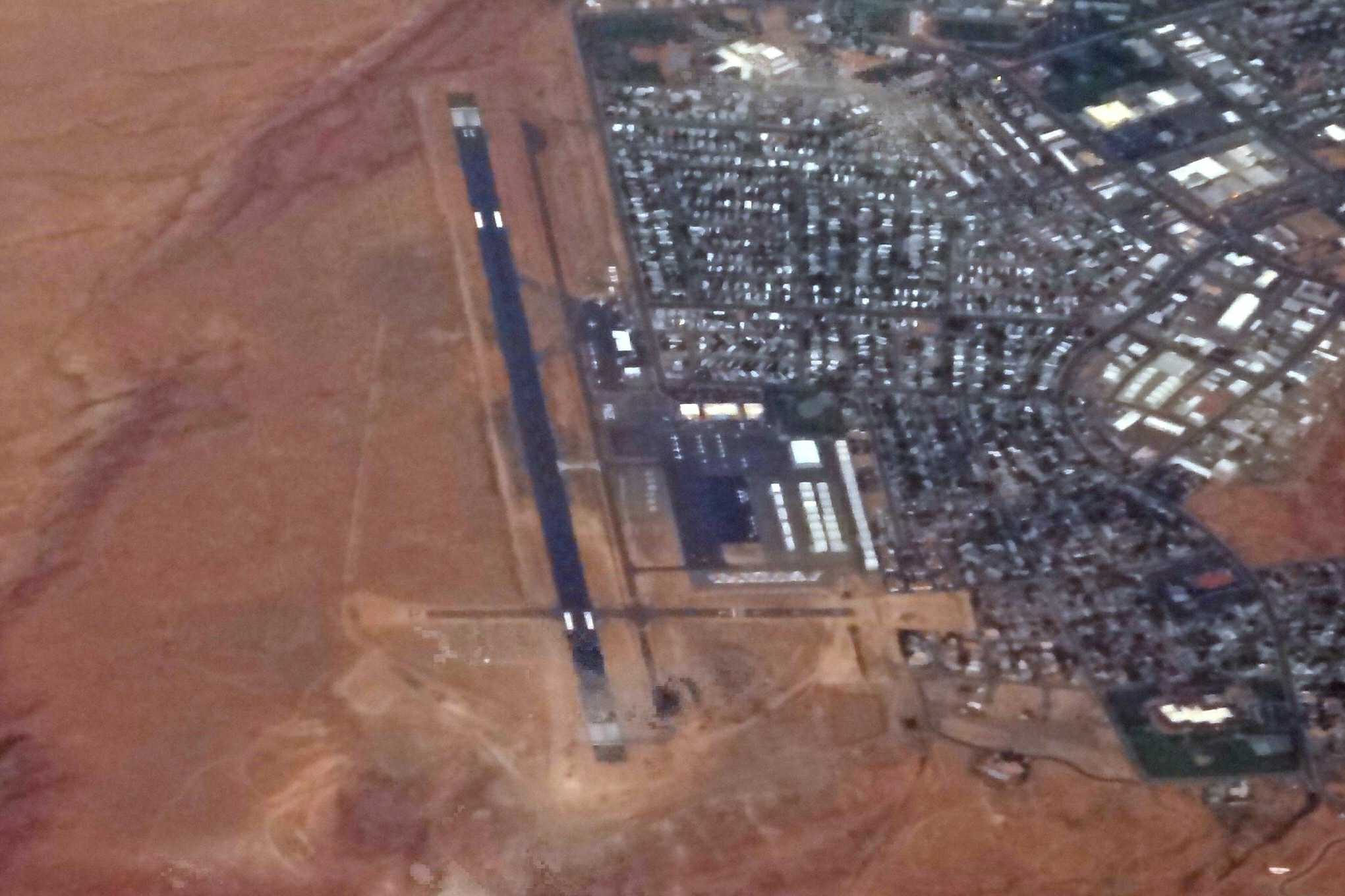
- IATA: PGA; ICAO: KPGA; FAA LID: PGA

Summary
- Airport type: Public
- Owner: City of Page
- Serves: Page, Arizona
- Elevation AMSL: 4,316 ft / 1,316 m
- Coordinates: 36°55′34″N 111°26′54″W
- Website: PGA website

Map
- Location in Arizona PGA (the United States)

Runways
Direction	Length		Surface
Direction	ft	m	Surface
15/33	5,950	1,814	Asphalt
7/25	2,201	671	Asphalt

Statistics (2022)
- Aircraft operations: 17,082
- Based aircraft: 70
- Source: Federal Aviation Administration

Page Municipal Airport (IATA: PGA, ICAO: KPGA, FAA LID: PGA) is a public use airport 1 mile (0.87 nmi; 1.6 km) east of Page, in Coconino County, Arizona. The airport has scheduled passenger service subsidized by the U.S. federal government's Essential Air Service program as well as regular sightseeing flights.

The National Plan of Integrated Airport Systems categorized it as a primary commercial service airport.

== History ==
The Page Airport was officially named the "Royce K Knight Field" on July 14, 1988, in recognition of the man who started the Page Airport during the construction of the Glen Canyon Dam. Knight ran the Fixed-base operator (FBO), which offered scenic flights over the Grand Canyon and Lake Powell areas.

== Facilities and aircraft ==
Page Municipal Airport covers 555 acres (225 ha) at an elevation of 4,316 ft (1,316 m). It has two asphalt runways:

- 15/33 is 5,950 ft × 150 ft (1,814 m × 46 m)
- 7/25 is 2,201 ft × 75 ft (671 m × 23 m)

In the year ending December 31, 2022; the airport had 17,082 aircraft operations, average 47 per day: 53% general aviation, 40% air taxi, 7% airline and <1% military. 70 aircraft were then based at this airport: 54 single-engine, 11 multi-engine, 3 helicopter, and 2 jet. The airport is an uncontrolled airport that has no control tower.

=== Historical airline service ===
Bonanza Air Lines began serving Page during the early 1960s with 40-passenger Fairchild F-27 turboprops with daily direct service to Phoenix via a stop at the Grand Canyon National Park Airport and also daily to Salt Lake City via a stop in Cedar City, Utah. Bonanza then merged with Pacific Air Lines and West Coast Airlines to form Air West which in 1968 was continuing to serve Page with daily direct F-27 flights to Phoenix via stops at the Grand Canyon airport and Prescott as well as direct to Salt Lake City via Cedar City. Air West then changed its name to Hughes Airwest which in 1972 was operating daily direct F-27 service to Las Vegas via Grand Canyon airport and also direct to Salt Lake City via Cedar City on a daily basis. By 1975, Hughes Airwest had introduced direct F-27 service on the weekdays to Los Angeles International Airport via stops at Grand Canyon, Las Vegas and Palm Springs as well as continuing to operate direct service to Salt Lake City via Cedar City. In 1977, Hughes Airwest was flying non-stop F-27 service to Phoenix on a weekday basis in addition to the direct flight to Salt Lake City via Cedar City and had turned over the Las Vegas service to SkyWest Airlines which was operating Piper Navajo twin prop aircraft on the route with non-stop flights. Hughes Airwest then discontinued all service into the airport and was no longer serving Page by 1980.

Following the cessation of service by Hughes Airwest, SkyWest Airlines, operating as an independent commuter air carrier, was providing non-stop service with Piper Navajo prop aircraft to Las Vegas and Phoenix. Scenic Airlines also flew nonstop service to Las Vegas on a seasonal basis during the late 1970s. By June 1, 1986, SkyWest was operating all service into Page as Western Express via a code sharing agreement with Western Airlines flying 19-passenger Fairchild Swearingen Metroliner propjets direct to Phoenix via a stop in Flagstaff and also non-stop to St. George, Utah. Following the acquisition of Western by Delta Air Lines on April 1, 1987, SkyWest began serving Page as a Delta Connection air carrier via a code sharing agreement with Delta with Fairchild Swearingen Metroliner propjets flying the same routes previously operated as Western Express. By 1995, SkyWest operating as the Delta Connection was operating three roundtrip non-stop flights a day with Metroliner aircraft between Page and Phoenix. In 1996 Great Lakes Airlines began serving the Page–Phoenix route with 19-seat Beechcraft 1900 commuter turboprops. The following year Scenic Airlines began serving Page once again and was flying the Page–Phoenix route with Cessna and Beechcraft 1900 aircraft. In 1998, Scenic was serving Page via a code sharing agreement with Delta Air Lines. In 1999 Sunrise Airlines took over the service flying three roundtrip non-stops a day between Page and Phoenix as an independent commuter air carrier with Piper Navajo aircraft. Great Lakes returned to Page in 2001, first operating flights to Phoenix as United Express on behalf of United Airlines via a code sharing agreement but then reverted to the independent Great Lakes banner the following year. Since then additional flights were operated at times to Denver, Las Vegas, and Farmington, NM before Great Lakes ceased all service and went out of business on March 26, 2018. The current provider, Contour Airlines, began service by fall, 2018. Contour also had service to Las Vegas and Grand Canyon Airlines (formerly Scenic Airlines) had service to Boulder City, NV prior to the start of the pandemic in early 2020.

== Airlines and destinations ==
Airlines	Destinations	Refs.
Contour Airlines	Las Vegas, Phoenix–Sky Harbor; Seasonal: Denver	

Contour Airlines operates Embraer ERJ family regional jets on all of its scheduled passenger flights serving the airport.

== Statistics ==
Carrier shares: August 2024 - July 2025
Carrier	Passengers (arriving and departing)
Contour Airlines	20,610(100%)

Top domestic destinations: (August 2024 - July 2025)
Rank	Airport name & IATA code	Passengers	Airline
1	Phoenix Sky Harbor International Airport (PHX)	10,310	Contour

EAS passenger boardings (enplanements) by year, as per the DOT
Year	2008	2009	2010	2011	2012	2013	2014	2015	2016	2017	2018
Enplanements	4,962	4,989	6,331	5,988	6,830	6,401	6,068	5,275	5,838	6,312	736
Change	▼9.53%	▲0.54%	▲26.90%	▼5.42%	▲14.06%	▼6.28%	▼5.20%	▼13.07%	▲10.67%	▲8.12%	▼88.34%
Airline	Great Lakes Airlines	Great Lakes Airlines	Great Lakes Airlines	Great Lakes Airlines	Great Lakes Airlines	Great Lakes Airlines	Great Lakes Airlines	Great Lakes Airlines	Great Lakes Airlines	Great Lakes Airlines	Great Lakes Airlines
Destination(s)	Farmington Phoenix	Farmington Phoenix	Farmington Phoenix	Farmington Phoenix	Farmington Las Vegas Phoenix	Farmington Las Vegas Phoenix	Phoenix	Denver Farmington Phoenix	Cortez Denver Phoenix	Phoenix	Phoenix

== See also ==
- List of airports in Arizona

== Other sources ==
- Essential Air Service documents (Docket OST-1997-2694) from the U.S. Department of Transportation:
  - Order 2005-3-16 (March 9, 2005): selecting Great Lakes Aviation, Ltd. to provide essential air service at Kingman, Prescott, Page, and Show Low for a new two-year period, at a combined first-year subsidy of $3,840,959, and a combined second-year subsidy of $3,854,958.
  - Order 2007-6-10 (June 13, 2007): selecting Great Lakes Aviation, Ltd. to provide subsidized EAS at Page and Show Low, Arizona, for two years, with the new contract term beginning when Air Midwest inaugurates service at Kingman and Prescott. The annual subsidy rates for Page and Show Low will be $1,497,556 and $988,181, respectively. Page will receive 19 weekly nonstop round trips to Phoenix with the option to provide one more frequency during peak times and one fewer during non peaks. One round trip a day may be substituted to either Las Vegas (nonstop) or Denver (one-stop) with no change in subsidy. Show Low will receive 14 nonstop round trips per week to Phoenix with 19-passenger Beechcraft 1900D aircraft.
  - Order 2009-8-5 (August 10, 2009): re-selecting Great Lakes Aviation, Ltd. to provide essential air service at Page and Show Low, Arizona, at annual subsidy rates of $1,995,273 and $1,407,255, respectively, and for a 19-month period from October 1, 2009, through April 30, 2011.
  - Order 2011-3-4 (March 1, 2011): re-selecting Great Lakes Aviation, Ltd. to provide essential air service at Kingman, Page, Prescott, and Show Low, Arizona for the two-year period from May 1, 2011, to April 30, 2013, for a combined annual subsidy of $5,596,114.
  - Order 2013-6-1 (June 3, 2013): re-selecting Great Lakes Aviation, Ltd. to provide Essential Air Service at Kingman, Page, Prescott, and Show Low, Arizona, for the two-year period from May 1, 2013, through April 30, 2015, for a combined annual subsidy of $7,873,533. Subsidy for Page: $2,472,028. Service from Page is to Phoenix Sky Harbor International Airport (PHX), with an option that one round trip a day may be substituted to either Denver International Airport (DEN) or Las Vegas McCarran International Airport (LAS).
  - Order 2013-6-9: approving the request of Great Lakes Aviation, Ltd. to change part of its service pattern at Page, Arizona to include the option of serving Los Angeles International Airport effective March 1, 2013, through April 30, 2013.
