= Four Corners Regional Airport =

Airport in Farmington, New Mexico, USA

- IATA: FMN; ICAO: KFMN; FAA LID: FMN

Summary
- Airport type: Public
- Operator: City of Farmington
- Location: Farmington, New Mexico
- Elevation AMSL: 5,506.6 ft (1,678.4 m)
- Coordinates: 36°44′28″N 108°13′48″W
- Website: www.fmtn.org/172/Airport

Map
- Farmington, NM

Runways
Direction	Length		Surface
Direction	ft	m	Surface
5/23	6,501	1,982	Asphalt
7/25	6,704	2,043	Asphalt

Statistics (for 12 months ending July 31, 2021)
- Aircraft operations: 44,803
- Based aircraft: 87
- Source: Federal Aviation Administration

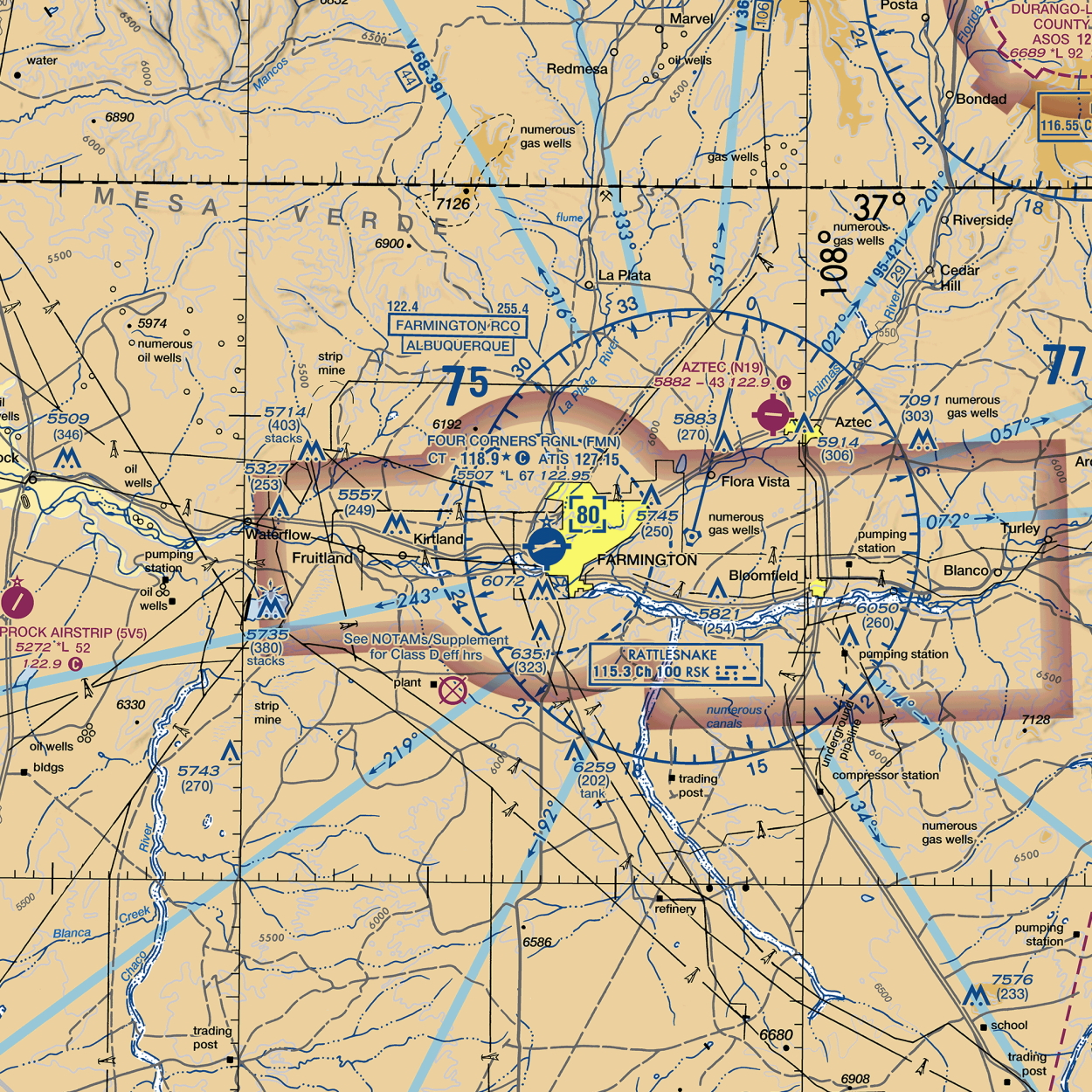
Four Corners Regional Airport VFR map (2022)

Four Corners Regional Airport (IATA: FMN, ICAO: KFMN, FAA LID: FMN) is in San Juan County, New Mexico, United States, in the city of Farmington, which owns it. It is a Class D towered general aviation airport offering daily nonstop United jet service to Denver International Airport (DEN) beginning May 2025. In addition, they offer chartered flight services, flight instruction, and a full-service fixed-base operator (FBO). It is included in the Federal Aviation Administration (FAA) National Plan of Integrated Airport Systems for 2019–2023, in which it is categorized as a regional general aviation facility.

The airport has free long-term passenger vehicle parking, a full service restaurant and one major car rental company at the terminal, and free WiFi in the terminal area.

Four Corners Regional Airport was previously served by many commercial air service providers and was at one time was the second busiest in the state of New Mexico, behind the Albuquerque International Sunport. Today it is typically the fourth or fifth busiest airport in the state, usually behind Albuquerque International Sunport, Double Eagle II Airport (also in Albuquerque), Santa Fe Regional Airport, Roswell International Air Center, and Lea County Regional Airport serving Hobbs.

== Historical airline service ==
Frontier Airlines (1950-1986) continued to serve Farmington with DC-3s through the 1950s and added flights to Phoenix making several en-route stops as well. In 1958 Frontier created a mini-hub at Farmington operating 13 flights per day with as many as five DC-3 aircraft on the ground at one time. Through the 1960s Frontier upgraded their aircraft with Convair 340 piston engine aircraft and later with Convair 580 turboprops. By 1981, Frontier had discontinued all flights to Albuquerque, Phoenix, and Salt Lake City; however, the flights to its Denver hub (with a fuel stop in Durango) were upgraded to Boeing 737-200 jetliners from 1982 through 1984. The Denver flights were then reverted to Convair 580 aircraft operated as Frontier Commuter before all service was discontinued in early 1985.

Aspen Airways first came to Farmington for a period in 1979 and flew Convair 580s nonstop to Denver and Albuquerque. The carrier returned to Farmington in 1983 with flights only to Denver and became a United Express affiliate in 1986. Some flights were then operated with the British Aerospace 146 jet.

Mesa Airlines was developed and headquartered at Farmington beginning in 1980. Mesa initially flew small aircraft to Albuquerque and later added service to Phoenix and Denver with larger aircraft accommodating up to 37 passengers. Mesa became a United Express affiliate from 1990 through 1998 on its flights to Denver and an America West Express affiliate on its flights to Phoenix from 1992 through 2008. The carrier continued to operate to Albuquerque under its own branding until 2007, often flying an hourly shuttle. Through the 1990's the carrier operated up to 30 flights per day at Farmington. All service ended in 2008.

Great Lakes Airlines provided service from 1998 through 2017 with flights to Denver and at times would fly westbound to Phoenix, Las Vegas, and Los Angeles. When service ended in 2017, Farmington was left with no commercial air service.

The airport received a Small Community Air Service Development Program grant in 2019 for SkyWest Airlines to begin service to Denver as United Express. The service was set to begin on October 15, 2020, but was delayed by the COVID-19 pandemic followed by a shortage of pilots at SkyWest. Once a day inbound and outbound flights between Farmington and Denver finally began in May 2025.

== Facilities and aircraft ==
Four Corners Regional Airport covers an area of 603 acres (244 ha) and contains two asphalt paved runways:

- Runway 5/23 – 6,501 x 150 ft (1,982 x 46 m)
- Runway 7/25 – 6,704 x 100 ft (2,043 x 30 m)

For the 12-month period ending December 31, 2021, the airport had 44,803 aircraft operations, an average of 122 per day: 84% general aviation, 13% air taxi and 3% military. For the period ending July 31, 2021, there were 87 aircraft based at this airport: 70 single-engine, 10 multi-engine, 1 jet, 4 helicopters, and 2 ultralights. The airport has one terminal for all arrivals and departures, as well as one FBO, Atlantic Aviation.

The data below lists annual total aircraft operations from the FAA's Air Traffic Activity System, 2009 through 2021.

Aircraft operations: FMN 2009–2021
Calendar year	Aircraft operations	%
2009	59,547	
2010	35,312	−40.70%
2011	37,499	6.19%
2012	37,266	-.62%
2013	36,337	−2.49%
2014	34,940	-3.84%
2015	30,615	-12.38%
2016	33,249	8.60%
2017	35,333	6.27%
2018	37,120	5.06%
2019	41,740	12.45%
2020	37,876	-9.26%
2021	44,827	18.35%

Airline passenger enplanements: FMN 2005–2017
Calendar year	Airline passenger enplanements	%
2005	29,000	
2006	27,000	
2007	26,000	
2008	17,000	
2009	11,000	
2010	13,000	
2011	16,000	
2012	16,000	
2013	14,000	
2014	5,670	
2015	3,057	
2016	1,354	
2017	2,739	
2018	0	

== Airlines and destinations ==
=== Passenger ===
United Express connects Four Corners Airport to Denver International Airport.

=== Cargo ===
FedEx Feeder connects Four Corners Airport to Albuquerque International Sunport.
