= Boulder City Airport =

Former airport in the U.S. state of Nevada

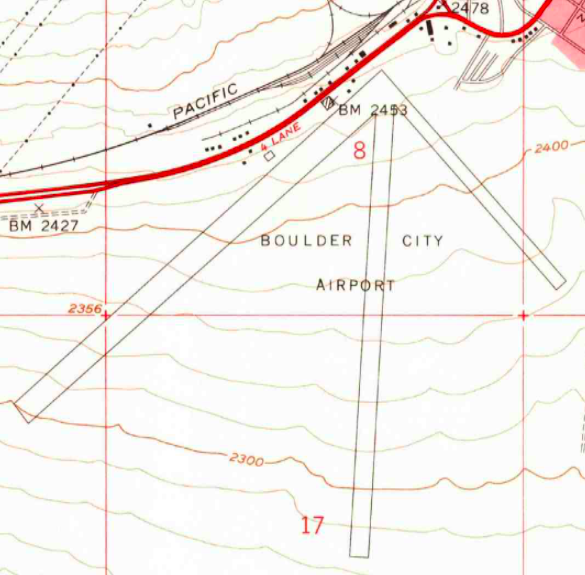
- The airport as depicted on a USGS map in 1958
- IATA: none; ICAO: none; FAA LID: BLD

Summary
- Airport type: Public
- Serves: Boulder City, Nevada
- Opened: 1933
- Closed: c. 1988
- Passenger services ceased: 1949
- Elevation AMSL: 2,458 ft (749 m)
- Coordinates: 35.9704°N 114.8494°W
- Interactive map of Boulder City Airport

Runways
Direction	Length		Surface
Direction	ft	m	Surface
3/21	2,900	880	Paved
- Reflects final runway configuration (1985)

Boulder City Airport was an airport in Boulder City, Clark County, Nevada, that operated from 1933 through the mid-1980s. It was also known as Bullock Airport during its early history.

== History ==
Boulder City Airport was dedicated on December 10, 1933, although it appears to have been operational at least a month earlier, per a newspaper report of the era. On September 30, 1935, a plane crashed and burned at the airport after the pilot, Arizona businessman Gene Redewill, had attended the dedication of the nearby Boulder Dam—although severely injured, Redewill survived.

Airline service began on June 15, 1936, with Grand Canyon Airlines. On April 3, 1938, the airport began airmail service, linking Los Angeles and San Francisco eastward. Trans World Airlines (TWA) opened a terminal at the airport the following month, and operated at Boulder City through the late 1940s. In December 1949, the Civil Aeronautics Authority (CAA) suspended commercial flights from operating at Boulder City, due to its runways not meeting minimum standards, causing TWA to use McCarran Field near Las Vegas. The terminal building was sold in 1958 to the Boulder City Elks Club, who continue to be headquartered there. Newspaper reports indicate the airport continued to operate for non-commercial flights through at least the mid-1980s.

Boulder City Airport has been replaced by Boulder City Municipal Airport, which opened in 1990. The prior airport was located north of the current airport, much closer to U.S. Route 93.

== Layout ==
A 1958 topographic map by the United States Geological Survey (USGS) shows the airport layout as three runways just southeast of U.S. Route 93.

Historical airport directories described the runways as follows:

Year	Publication	Runways	Lengths	Comments
1960	Jeppesen Airway Manual	3/21; 17/35; 12/30	6,383 ft (1,946 m); 6,495 ft (1,980 m); 3,680 ft (1,120 m)	All unpaved Runways 17/35 & 12/30 not maintained
1962	AOPA Airport Directory			Two unpaved runways
1967	Flight Guide	3/21; 17/35	3,100 ft (940 m) paved; 6,495 ft (1,980 m) unpaved	Runway 3/21 longer than its paved section
1980	Las Vegas Terminal Aeronautical Chart	3/21	3,100 ft (940 m) paved	
1982	AOPA Airport Directory	3/21; 17/35	3,100 ft (940 m) asphalt; 4,000 ft (1,200 m) gravel	operator: Lake Mead Air
1985	Las Vegas Sectional Chart	3/21	2,900 ft (880 m) paved	Runway listed as northeast–southwest
1994	CG-18 World Aeronautical Chart	–	–	Abandoned

== See also ==
- TWA Flight 3, which crashed in 1942 following departure from Las Vegas after the crew likely used a Boulder City outbound course by accident
