= Grand Canyon West =

Grand Canyon West, Arizona
- Census-designated place
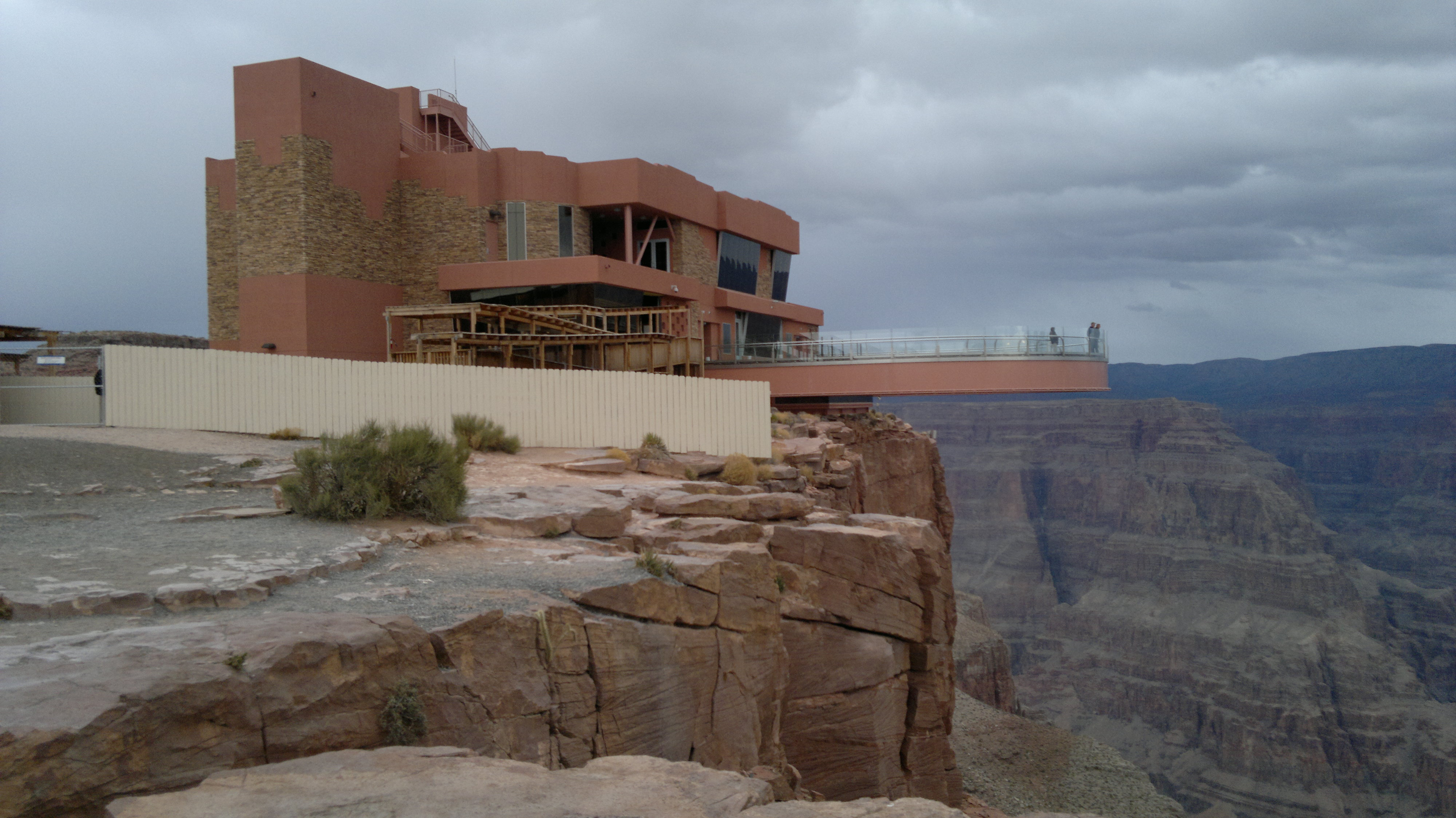
- The Grand Canyon Skywalk, a popular attraction in Grand Canyon West
- Coordinates: 36°00′10″N 113°48′41″W
- Country: United States
- State: Arizona
- County: Mohave

Area
  - Total: 17.60 sq mi (45.59 km^{2})
  - Land: 17.19 sq mi (44.52 km^{2})
  - Water: 0.41 sq mi (1.07 km^{2})
- Elevation: 4,738 ft (1,444 m)

Population (2020)
  - Total: 0
  - Density: 0/sq mi (0/km^{2})
- Time zone: UTC-7 (MST)
- Area code: 928
- FIPS code: 04-28985
- GNIS feature ID: 2582791
- Website: grandcanyonwest.com

Grand Canyon West is a tourism development on the Hualapai Reservation in Mohave County, Arizona, United States. Grand Canyon West is home to the tribe's Grand Canyon business operations, including the Grand Canyon West Airport and the Grand Canyon Skywalk. Operated by the tribal-owned Grand Canyon Resort Corporation, the development is the primary source of revenue and employment for the tribe. The Hualapai allow activities that are not permitted in the neighboring Grand Canyon National Park to attract tourists, such as flights within the canyon, motorized boats on the Colorado River, daredevil stunts, and development of the Skywalk.

Other facilities at Grand Canyon West include a visitor center, restaurants, cabins, a zipline over a side canyon, a Western-themed street, and examples of Native American dwellings.

== History ==
The Hualapai tribe saw tourism as the best way to support its economic development, and its location at the Grand Canyon provided a business opportunity. Grand Canyon West was established in 1988 with a dirt airport and originally offered tribal member-led tours. The airport was paved in 1997. A helicopter pilot known for giving passengers harrowing rides grazed a canyon wall with the helicopter rotor in September 2003, causing it to crash and killing all six passengers.

While the Hualapai had a tribal casino gambling enterprise in 1995, its location three hours from Las Vegas resulted in its failure in less than a year. Grand Canyon West was further developed as a site for views of the canyon, receiving 150,000 visitors a year prior to 2007. The Grand Canyon Skywalk, a cantilevered glass-bottomed walkway extending out from the rim of the canyon, was conceived in 2003 to be its principal attraction. It opened in 2007 at a cost of $40 million.

The road to Grand Canyon West was paved in 2014 following a lengthy legal fight with a nearby landowner.

Grand Canyon West first surpassed 1 million annual visitors in 2015. The majority of visitors are international, many from China.

The Hualapai Tribe has permitted several daredevil stunts at Grand Canyon West to showcase itself to the world; the Hualapai Tribal Council must permit them as safe and respectful of their culture. After being denied a permit by the National Park Service, Stuntman Dar Robinson drove a sports car over the canyon's edge in the Hualapai Reservation for the show That's Incredible! in 1980, parachuting out of the car as it fell. In 1999, Robbie Knievel jumped a side gorge of the Grand Canyon on a motorcycle, a televised stunt the tribe used to promote their tourist industry after the national park denied a permit. Another stunt rejected by the park but permitted by the Hualapai at Grand Canyon West occurred in 2011 when Yves Rossy flew over the Grand Canyon with a custom-built jet pack. In 2010, magician Criss Angel was suspended above the canyon while locked inside a crate for Mindfreak.

The Hualapai tribe installed a solar-powered microgrid with battery storage in 2023, reducing use of diesel because the area is not connected to the main electrical grid.

== Flights ==
Grand Canyon West Airport provides access to air taxi flights from Las Vegas and is a base for sightseeing helicopters.

The tribal airspace above Grand Canyon West is not subject to federal regulations and limitations on the number of sightseeing flights that exist for Grand Canyon National Park, which has led to noise, environmental, and safety concerns. The Hualapai tribe also permits helicopters to fly in between canyon walls and land near the floor of the canyon, while aircraft are not permitted below the rim in the national park.

Following aviation accidents at the Grand Canyon, including a 1986 mid-air collision between two sightseeing aircraft, Congress passed the National Parks Overflights Act of 1987 and the Federal Aviation Administration imposed regulations on scenic flights over Grand Canyon National Park. However, the regulation exempted flights over the Hualapai Reservation.

== Geography ==
Grand Canyon West is located in northern Mohave County on the west side of the Grand Canyon on its South Rim, though it is also referred to as the West Rim to distinguish from the main facilities of Grand Canyon National Park. It is at the northwestern corner of the Hualapai Reservation and borders Grand Canyon National Park at the Colorado River. It is served by Diamond Bar Road, which leads southwest 20 miles (32 km) to County Highway 25 near Meadview.

Guano Point lies at the north end of Grand Canyon West and has remnants of a closed mine tramway headhouse and a panoramic view of the canyon.

== Census-designated place ==
Grand Canyon West is also a classified as a census-designated place (CDP). According to the United States Census Bureau, the CDP has a total area of 17.6 square miles (46 km^{2}), 17.19 square miles (44.5 km^{2}) of that being land, with the remaining 0.41 square miles (1.1 km^{2}) consisting of water.

As of the 2010 census, there were 2 people living in the CDP, both male. The CDP contained 19 housing units, of which 2 were occupied and 17 were vacant. The 2020 census recorded no residents. Employee housing is not provided due to limited water resources.

== See also ==
- Grand Canyon Escalade
