= Grand Canyon West Airport =

Airport in Mohave County, Arizona

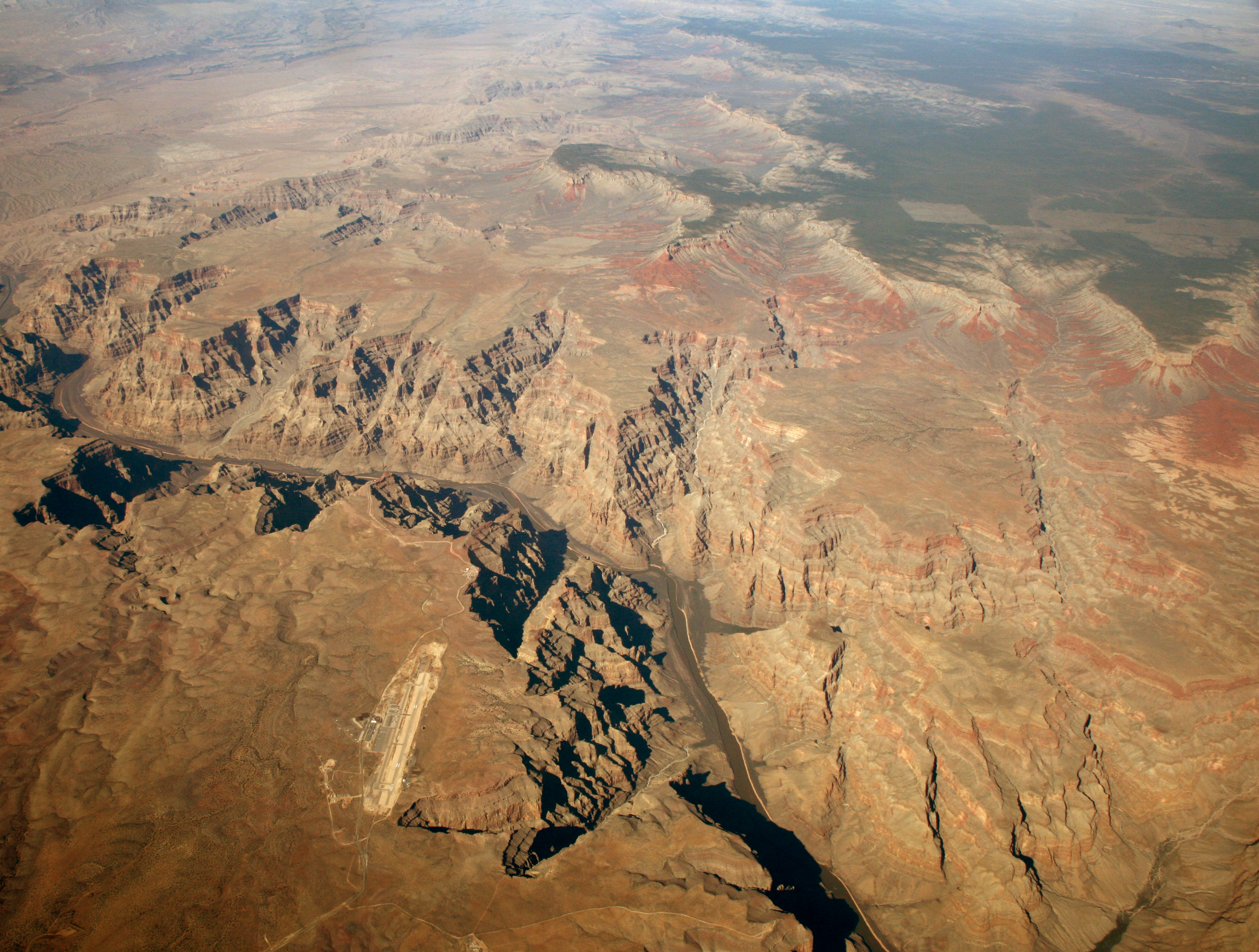
- IATA: GCW; ICAO: none; FAA LID: 1G4

Summary
- Airport type: Public
- Owner: The Hualapai Indian Tribe
- Serves: Grand Canyon West
- Location: 60 miles (97 km) northwest of Peach Springs, Arizona
- Elevation AMSL: 4,825 ft (1,471 m)
- Coordinates: 35°59′25″N 113°48′59″W

Map
- Location within Arizona Location within the United States

Runways
Direction	Length		Surface
Direction	ft	m	Surface
17/35	5,000	1,524	Asphalt

Statistics (2022)
- Aircraft operations (year ending 6/10/2022): 12,917
- Source: Federal Aviation Administration

Grand Canyon West Airport (IATA: GCW, FAA LID: 1G4) is a public airport 60 miles (52 nmi; 97 km) northwest of Peach Springs, in Mohave County, Arizona, United States. It is owned and operated by the Hualapai tribe and is on the Hualapai Indian Reservation.

Federal Aviation Administration records say the airport had 137,771 commercial passenger boardings (enplanements) in calendar year 2017. The FAA's National Plan of Integrated Airport Systems for 2007–2011 classified it as commercial service - primary because it has over 10,000 passenger boardings per year.

== Facilities ==
Grand Canyon West Airport covers 350 acres (140 ha). It has one runway:

- 17/35 measuring 5,000 ft × 75 ft (1,524 m × 23 m), asphalt

In the year ending June 10, 2022 the airport had 12,917 aircraft operations, average 35 per day: 99% air taxi, and 1% general aviation.

== Airline and destination ==
Airlines	Destinations
Grand Canyon Airlines	Charter: Boulder City

== See also ==
- List of airports in Arizona
