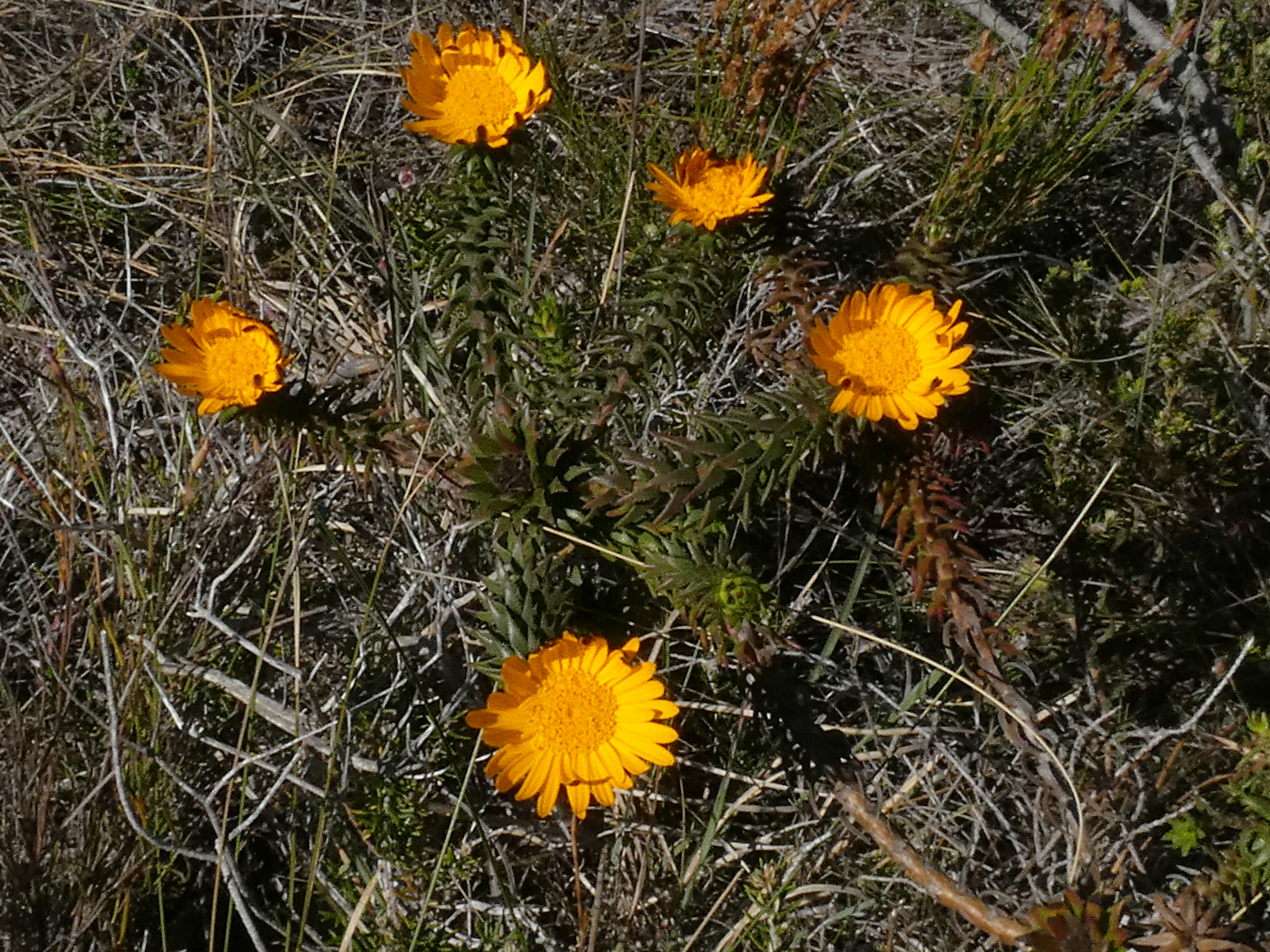
- Oedera capensis

Scientific classification
- Kingdom: Plantae
- Clade: Embryophytes
- Clade: Tracheophytes
- Clade: Angiosperms
- Clade: Eudicots
- Clade: Asterids
- Order: Asterales
- Family: Asteraceae
- Subfamily: Asteroideae
- Tribe: Gnaphalieae
- Genus: Oedera; L. 1771, conserved name, not Crantz 1768 (syn of Dracaena in Asparagaceae)

Synonyms
- Eroeda Levyns; Antithrixia DC.; Comborhiza Anderb. & K.Bremer; Eclopes Banks ex Gaertn.; Lapeirousia Thunb., nom. illeg.; Oederia DC., orth. var.; Oreoleysera K.Bremer; Osmites L., nom. rej.; Peyrousea DC., nom. rej.; Polychaetia Tausch ex Less.; Relhania L'Hér., nom. cons.; Rosenia Thunb.

= Oedera =

Genus of flowering plants

Oedera is a genus of African flowering plants in the tribe Gnaphalieae within the family Asteraceae. The genus is named in honor of the Danish botanist Georg Christian Oeder.

The species have yellow central and ray florets in their flower-heads. Their seeds all have a little crown of scales, and the leaves are often fragrant and unpalatable for stock grazing.

== Species ==
Species accepted by the Plants of the World Online as of March 2024:

- Oedera acerosa (DC.) N.G.Bergh
- Oedera calycina (L.f.) N.G.Bergh
- Oedera capensis (L.) Druce
- Oedera conferta (Hutch.) Anderb. & K.Bremer
- Oedera corymbosa (Bolus) N.G.Bergh
- Oedera decussata (L'Hér.) N.G.Bergh
- Oedera dieterlenii (E.Phillips) N.G.Bergh
- Oedera epaleacea Beyers
- Oedera flavicoma (DC.) N.G.Bergh
- Oedera foveolata (K.Bremer) Anderb. & K.Bremer
- Oedera fruticosa (L.) N.G.Bergh
- Oedera garnotii (Less.) N.G.Bergh
- Oedera genistifolia (L.) Anderb. & K.Bremer
- Oedera glandulosa (Thunb.) N.G.Bergh
- Oedera hirta Thunb.
- Oedera humilis (Less.) N.G.Bergh
- Oedera imbricata Lam.
- Oedera intermedia DC.
- Oedera laevis DC.
- Oedera longipes (K.Bremer) N.G.Bergh
- Oedera montana (Bolus) N.G.Bergh
- Oedera muirii C.A.Sm.
- Oedera multipunctata (DC.) Anderb. & K.Bremer
- Oedera nordenstamii (K.Bremer) Anderb. & K.Bremer
- Oedera oppositifolia (DC.) N.G.Bergh
- Oedera pungens (L'Hér.) N.G.Bergh
- Oedera relhanioides (Schltr.) N.G.Bergh
- Oedera resinifera (K.Bremer) Anderb. & K.Bremer
- Oedera rotundifolia (Less.) N.G.Bergh
- Oedera sedifolia (DC.) Anderb. & K.Bremer
- Oedera silicicola (K.Bremer) Anderb. & K.Bremer
- Oedera spathulifolia (K.Bremer) N.G.Bergh
- Oedera speciosa (DC.) N.G.Bergh
- Oedera spinescens (DC.) N.G.Bergh
- Oedera squarrosa (L.) Anderb. & K.Bremer
- Oedera steyniae (L.Bolus) Anderb. & K.Bremer
- Oedera tricephala (DC.) N.G.Bergh
- Oedera uniflora (L.f.) Anderb. & K.Bremer
- Oedera virgata (N.E.Br.) N.G.Bergh
- Oedera viscosa (L'Hér.) Anderb. & K.Bremer

=== Formerly included ===
See Flaveria Heterolepis Hirpicium

- Oedera aliena L.f. – Heterolepis aliena (L.f.) Druce
- Oedera alienata Thunb. – Hirpicium alienatum (Thunb.) Druce
- Oedera trinervia Spreng. – Flaveria trinervia (Spreng.) C.Mohr
