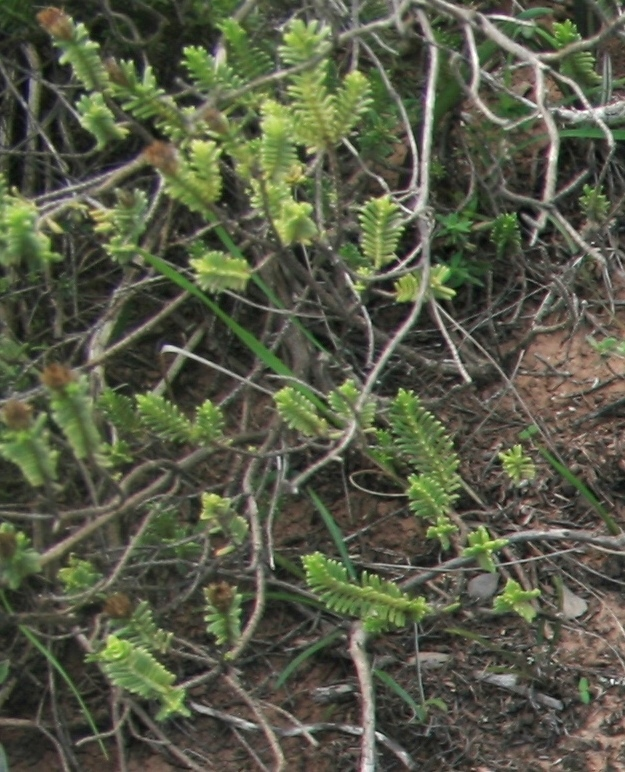

Scientific classification
- Kingdom: Plantae
- Clade: Tracheophytes
- Clade: Angiosperms
- Clade: Eudicots
- Clade: Asterids
- Order: Asterales
- Family: Asteraceae
- Genus: Oedera
- Species: O. uniflora

Binomial name
- Oedera uniflora (L.f.) Anderb. & K.Bremer

Synonyms
- Relhania uniflora

= Oedera uniflora =

Shrublet in the daisy family from South Africa

Oedera uniflora ("Kalksteenperdekaroo") is a prickly shrublet belonging to the family Asteraceae.

== Description ==
Oedera uniflora is a small shrublet, with extremely sticky leaves, arranged in four clear ranks.

Each leaf has a tip that is slightly hooked downwards, and a clear basal abscission line.

The yellow flowerheads are usually solitary, and appear at the tips of the branches in Spring and Summer.

It can resemble Oedera garnotii, but the latter species has leaves in an imbricate arrangement, each is straight with a longitudinal groove.

== Distribution ==
It is endemic to the Western Cape Province, South Africa, where it occurs from the Robertson Karoo and Overberg regions to Bredasdorp and the Agulhas plain in the south, and as far east as Riversdale and Mossel Bay.

An outlying group of populations also occurs far to the west, near Saldanha.

It usually grows in coastal limestones or sands, as well as on rocky shale hill slopes.
