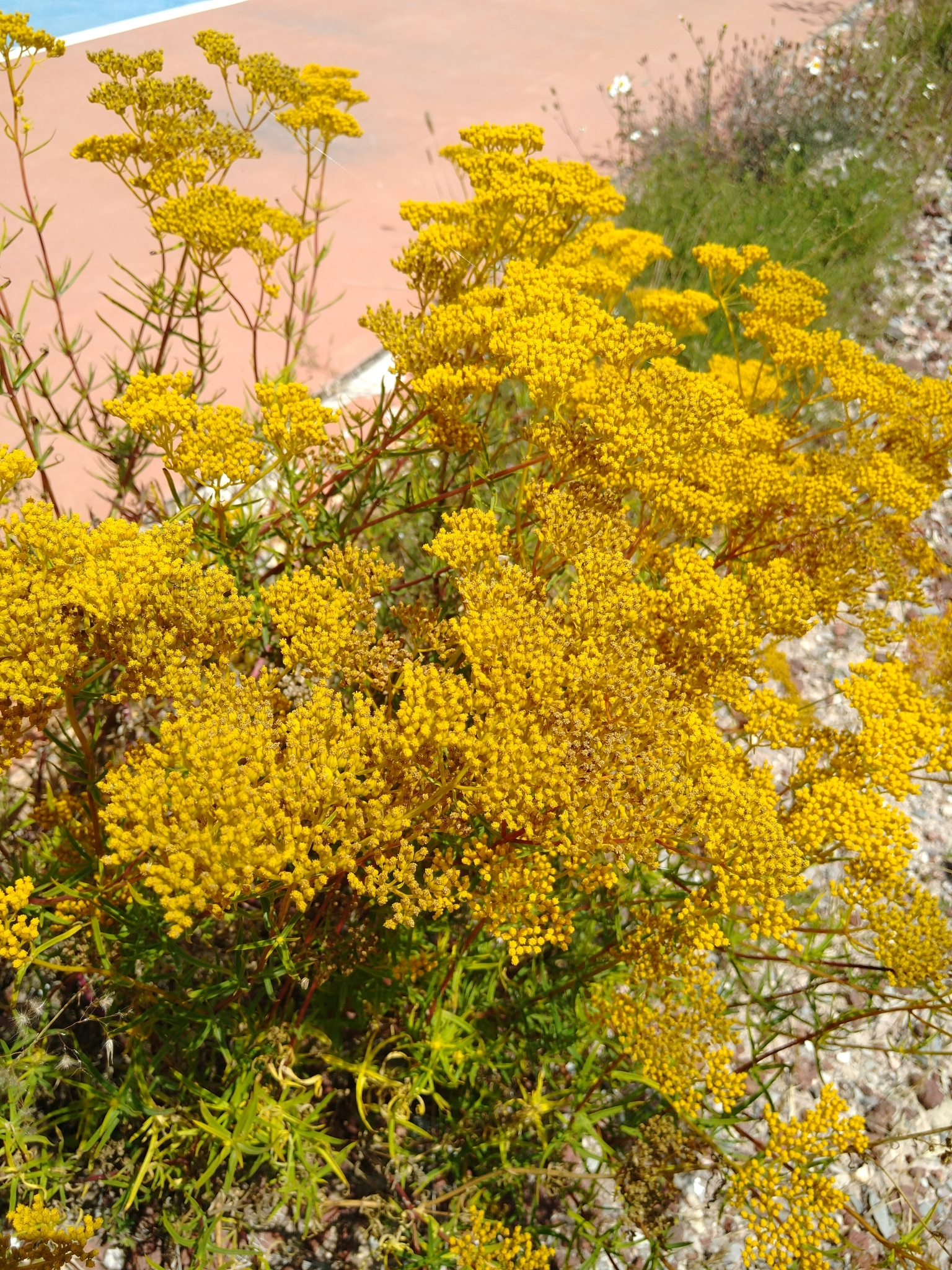

Scientific classification
- Kingdom: Plantae
- Clade: Tracheophytes
- Clade: Angiosperms
- Clade: Eudicots
- Clade: Asterids
- Order: Asterales
- Family: Asteraceae
- Genus: Flaveria
- Species: F. oppositifolia

Binomial name
- Flaveria oppositifolia (DC.) Rydb. 1915

Synonyms
- Flaveria longifolia A.Gray; Gymnosperma oppositifolium DC. 1836

= Flaveria oppositifolia =

Species of flowering plant

Flaveria oppositifolia is a rare Mexican plant species of Flaveria within the family Asteraceae. It has been found only in northeastern Mexico, from Tamaulipas west to Coahuila, south as far as Hidalgo and Aguascalientes. Some sources report the species to be present in the State of Texas in the United States, but the Texas populations have been recognized as a distinct species, F. brownii.

Flaveria oppositifolia is a perennial herb up to 80 cm (31.5 in) tall. Leaves are about 5–10 cm (2–4 in) long, covered in short, soft hairs. One plant can produce numerous flower heads in a loose branching array. Each head contains 10-15 yellow disc flowers but no ray flowers.
