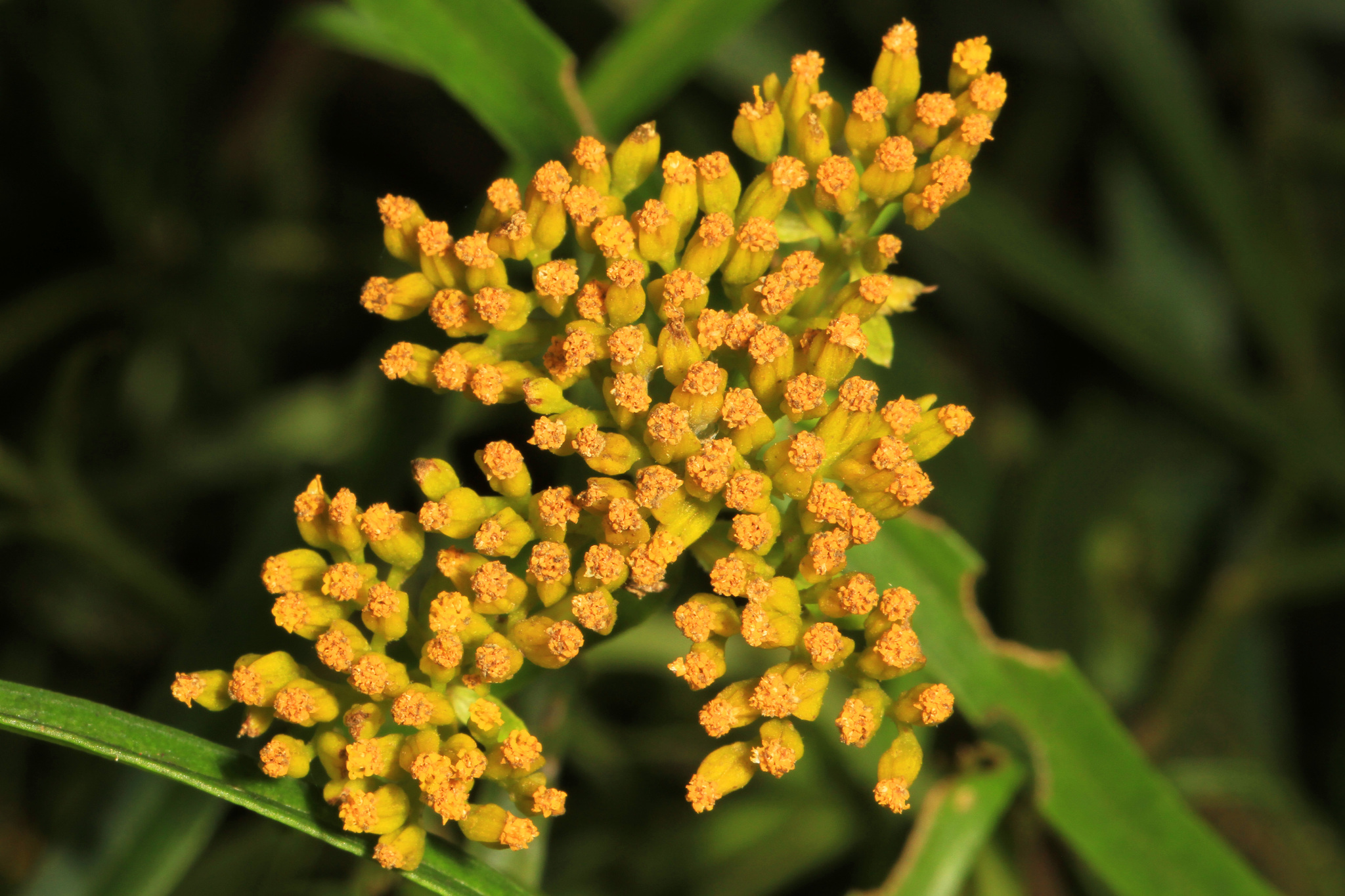

Scientific classification
- Kingdom: Plantae
- Clade: Tracheophytes
- Clade: Angiosperms
- Clade: Eudicots
- Clade: Asterids
- Order: Asterales
- Family: Asteraceae
- Genus: Flaveria
- Species: F. linearis

Binomial name
- Flaveria linearis Lag. 1816

Synonyms
- Flaveria latifolia (J.R.Johnst.) Rydb.; Flaveria tenuifolia Nutt; Gymnosperma nudatum DC.; Selloa nudata Nutt.; Flaveria linearis var. latifolia J.R. Johnst

= Flaveria linearis =

Species of flowering plant

Flaveria linearis, known as narrowleaf yellowtops, is a North American plant species of Flaveria within the family Asteraceae. It is native to Florida, Cuba, Bahamas, and the Yucatán Peninsula of Mexico.

Flaveria linearis is a perennial herb up to 80 cm tall. Leaves are long and narrow, up to 13 cm (5 in) long. One plant can produce sometimes as many as 150 small flower heads in a branching array. Each head contains 2-8 yellow disc flowers and sometimes a single yellow ray flower.
