= Flaveria angustifolia =

Scientific classification
- Kingdom: Plantae
- Clade: Tracheophytes
- Clade: Angiosperms
- Clade: Eudicots
- Clade: Asterids
- Order: Asterales
- Family: Asteraceae
- Genus: Flaveria
- Species: F. angustifolia

Binomial name
- Flaveria angustifolia (Cav.) Pers. 1807 not A. Gray 1849

Synonyms
- Flaveria elata Klatt; Flaveria integrifolia Moc. & Sessé; Flaveria radicans Moc. & Sessé; Milleria angustifolia Cav. 1795

Species of flowering plant

Flaveria angustifolia is a Mexican plant species of yellowtops within the family Asteraceae. It has been found only in central Mexico, in Oaxaca, Guerrero, Puebla, and the Distrito Federal.

Flaveria angustifolia is a perennial herb up to 100 cm (39 in) tall. Leaves are long and narrow, up to 12 cm (4.7 in) long. One plant can produce numerous flower heads in a dense spiral array. Each head contains 5-7 yellow disc flowers. some heads contain no ray flowers but other heads in the same cluster may have one yellow ray flower.
