= Flaveria kochiana =

Scientific classification
- Kingdom: Plantae
- Clade: Tracheophytes
- Clade: Angiosperms
- Clade: Eudicots
- Clade: Asterids
- Order: Asterales
- Family: Asteraceae
- Genus: Flaveria
- Species: F. kochiana

Binomial name
- Flaveria kochiana B.L.Turner 1995

Species of flowering plant

Flaveria kochiana is a rare Mexican plant species of Flaveria within the family Asteraceae. It has been found only in the State of Oaxaca in southwestern Mexico.

Flaveria kochiana is a subshrub up to 30 cm (12 in) tall. Leaves are long and narrow, generally about 9 cm (3.5 in) long. One plant can produce numerous small yellow flower heads densely packed in a tight clump. Each head contains 2-4 disc flowers plus usually a few ray flowers, though some heads lack rays.
