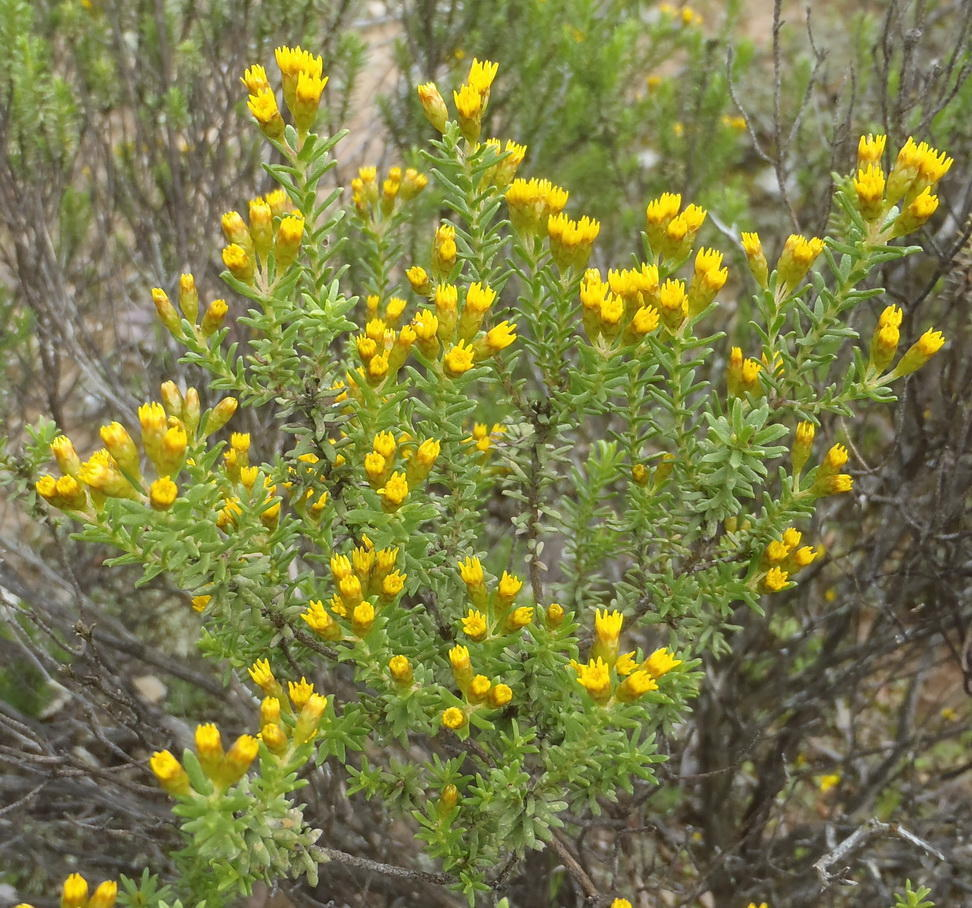

Scientific classification
- Kingdom: Plantae
- Clade: Tracheophytes
- Clade: Angiosperms
- Clade: Eudicots
- Clade: Asterids
- Order: Asterales
- Family: Asteraceae
- Genus: Oedera
- Species: O. genistifolia

Binomial name
- Oedera genistifolia (L.) Anderb. & K.Bremer

Synonyms
- Relhania genistifolia

= Oedera genistifolia =

Shrublet in the daisy family from South Africa

Oedera genistifolia ("Klein Perdekaroo") is a prickly shrublet belonging to the family Asteraceae.

It is an abundant and common species in the southwestern cape, South Africa (Namaqualand to Grahamstown). It is most commonly found on lower north-facing slopes, especially on rocky clay and shale based soils.

== Description ==
Oedera genistifolia is a small (60cm high), erect shrublet. The leaves, which grow densely packed along the stems, are small (15mm), thin (3mm), straight, suberect, usually mucronate, and slightly furry along their margins and lower midrib.

The leaf has a short point (mucro) at its tip, which is usually slightly hooked downwards.

The leaf surfaces are also glandular, and the surface of the young leaves is slightly sticky.

The yellow flowerheads appear in Spring. They are 10mm wide, and are born on short stalks (2-10mm)

=== Related species ===
It resembles Oedera squarrosa, which however has leaves that are broader and more spreading-recurved.
