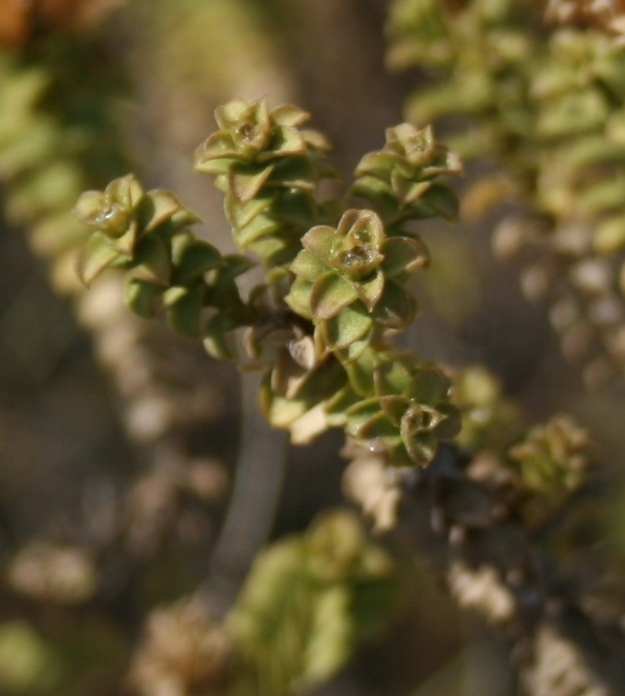
- Oedera squarrosa leaf detail

Scientific classification
- Kingdom: Plantae
- Clade: Tracheophytes
- Clade: Angiosperms
- Clade: Eudicots
- Clade: Asterids
- Order: Asterales
- Family: Asteraceae
- Genus: Oedera
- Species: O. squarrosa

Binomial name
- Oedera squarrosa (L.) Anderb. & K.Bremer

Synonyms
- Relhania squarrosa

= Oedera squarrosa =

Shrublet in the daisy family from South Africa

Oedera squarrosa ("Vierkant-perdekaroo") is a prickly shrublet belonging to the family Asteraceae.

It is an abundant and common species in the southwestern Cape Provinces of South Africa (Namaqualand to Port Elizabeth). It is most commonly found near to the main mountain ranges, especially in rocky loamy or clayey soils.

== Description ==
Oedera squarrosa is a small, erect shrublet (60cm high). The leaves are small (15mm x 7mm), ovate, glandular and down-curved, with thickened margins, and grow densely packed along the stems. On the younger stems, the leaves are usually in four ranks. Older stems often have a more imbricate arrangement.

Tufts of a couple of yellow flowerheads appear at the tips of the branches in Spring and Summer. They are 10mm wide, with relatively short stalks (2-10mm).

=== Related species ===
Oedera squarrosa is closely related to Oedera genistifolia, another widespread species that is found on lower (usually north-facing) slopes of shale, sandstone or limestone. However, O. squarrosa has wider leaves (7 mm) that are more recurved or down-turned.
