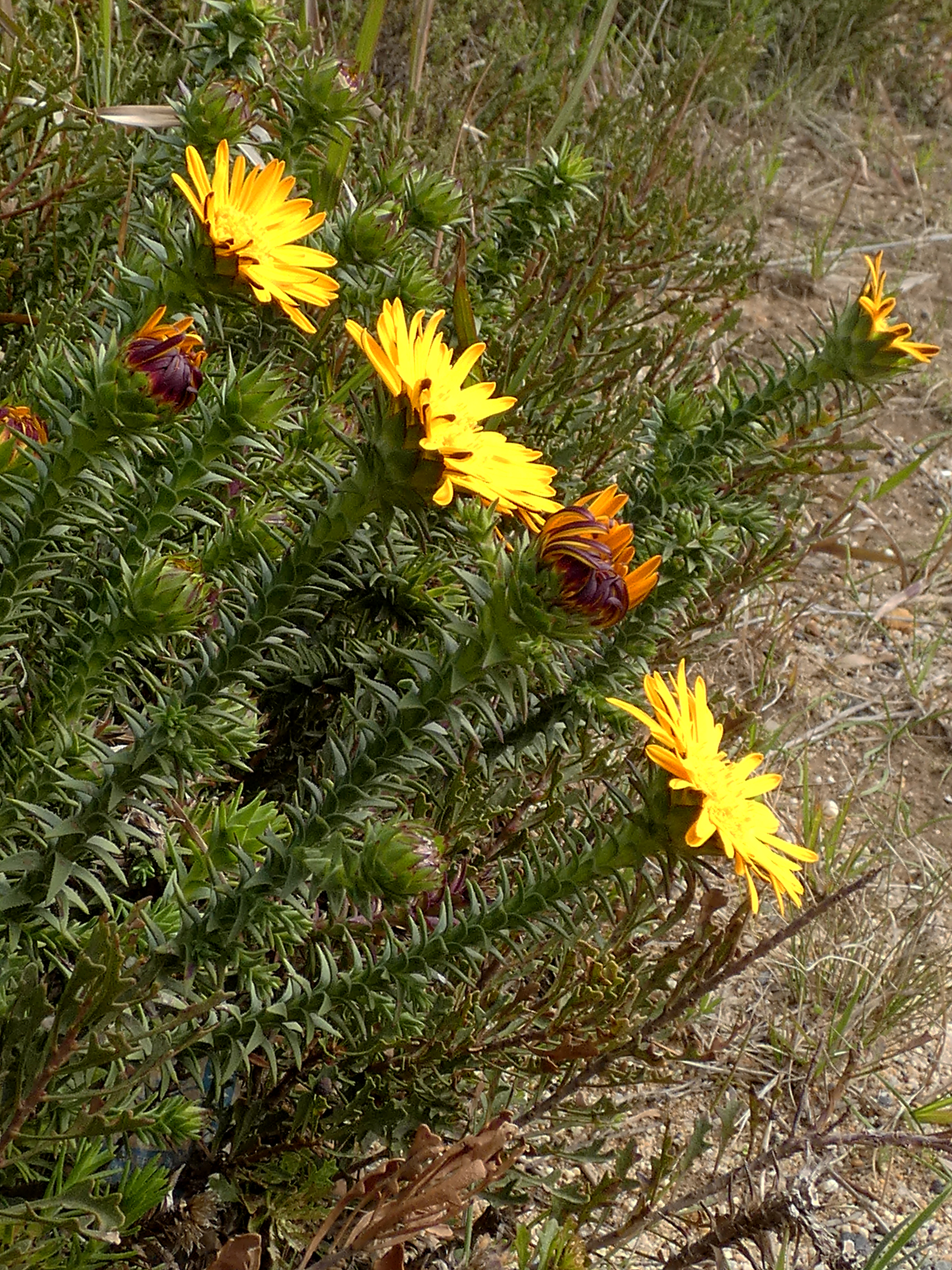
- Oedera capensis
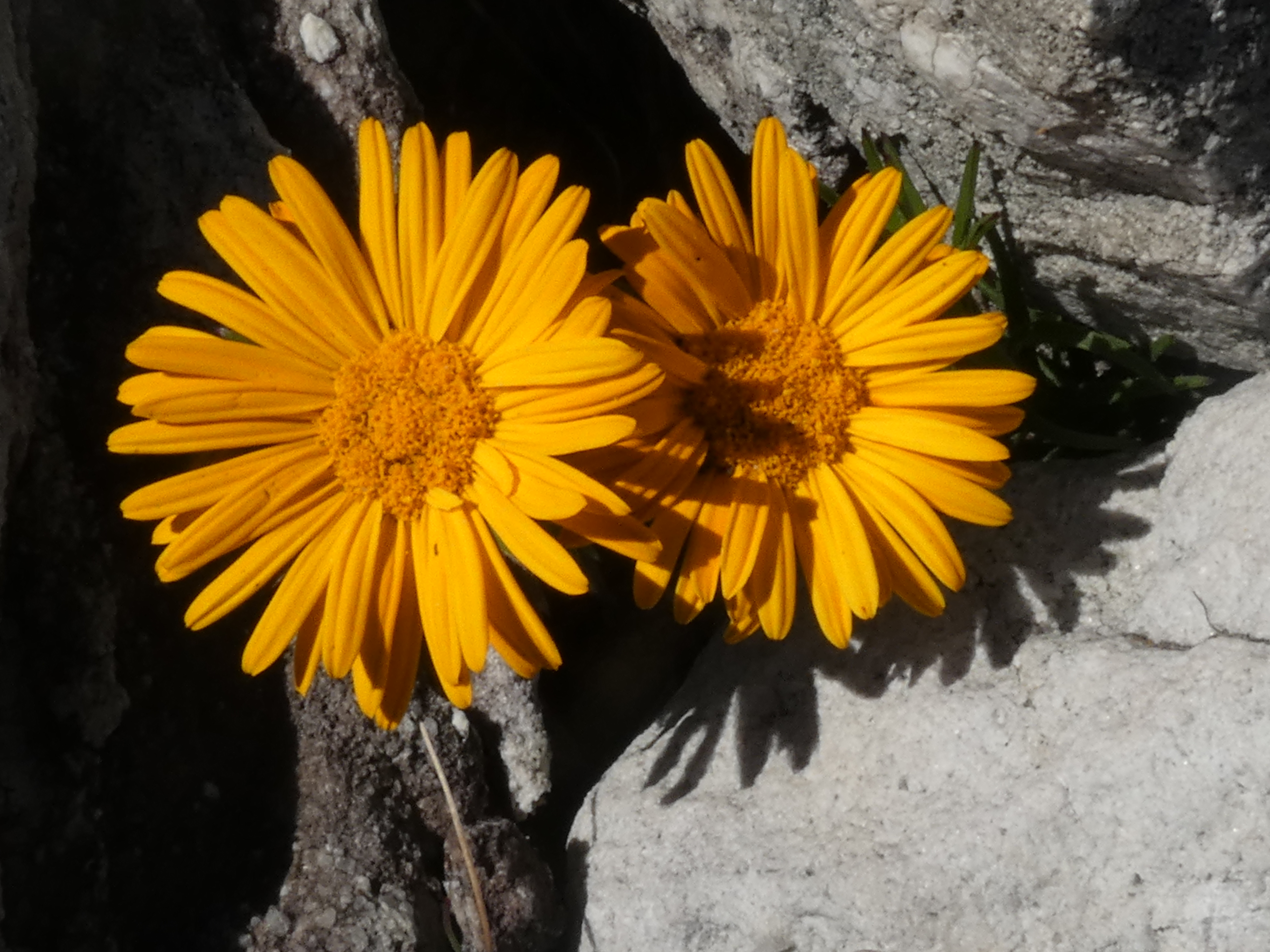
- Composite flowerheads

Scientific classification
- Kingdom: Plantae
- Clade: Tracheophytes
- Clade: Angiosperms
- Clade: Eudicots
- Clade: Asterids
- Order: Asterales
- Family: Asteraceae
- Genus: Oedera
- Species: O. capensis

Binomial name
- Oedera capensis (L.) Druce

Synonyms
- Buphthalmum capense; Eroeda capensis; Oedera prolifera

= Oedera capensis =

Cape Perdekaroo

Shrublet in the daisy family from South Africa

Oedera capensis, the cape perdekaroo, is a prickly shrublet belonging to the family Asteraceae. It has stems that branch only at the foot and are densely set over their entire length with narrowly triangular leathery leaves with a sharp tip at approximately right angles to the stem. At their tip are what at first sight appears to be a single flowerhead with yellow ray florets and yellow disc florets. In fact, these are mostly nine densely cropped heads, as is suggested by the nine domes of the "disc" of the composite head, the untidy arrangement of the ray florets, and becomes very clear when cutting through the composite head. It is an endemic of the south of the Western Cape province in South Africa.

== Description ==
Oedera capensis is a prickly, sprawling shrublet of about 25 cm (9.8 in) high, that produces between two and six branches below the flower heads of the previous season. Stems are densely and alternately set with mostly hairless, erect to recurved, flat, leathery, narrow triangular leaves 5–25 mm (0.20–0.98 in) long and 2–6 mm (0.079–0.236 in), with glands and silky hairs along the edges. Usually nine (rarely ten or eleven) flower heads are cropped at the tip of the branches in what seems at first sight a single flower head of mostly 20–25 mm (0.79–0.98 in) in diameter. The central head consists of yolk yellow disc florets only, while the remainder has disc florets and in addition a row of yolk yellow ray florets, burgundy on the reverse, where they do not touch the other heads. A cluster of cropped heads usually has 30 to 40 ray florets. A few shorter ray florets sometimes occur where the heads touch. The involucre that surrounds the cropped heads consist of several whorls of green, leaf-like bracts of usually 2–3 mm (0.079–0.118 in) wide, lanceolate, widest at midlength and with a prominent rib along the midline. The inner row of bracts surrounding the cropped heads have dense, silky hair in the lower part of their edges. The involucral bracts between the individual heads are thin and papery. The pappus consists of a circle of scales around the tip of the cypselas. Flowering usually appears from June to September, rarely extending to December. This species has seven sets of homologue chromosomes (2n=14).

=== Differences with other species ===
Oedera imbricata has bright yellow flower heads, not yolk yellow.

== Taxonomy ==
Carl Linnaeus, a Swedish naturalist famous for his introduction of the binominal nomenclature, first described the plant in 1759 as Buphthalmum capense. His son, Carl Linnaeus the Younger later described Oedera prolifera. In 1914, George Claridge Druce reassigned the species, creating the new combination Oedera capensis. South African botanist Margaret Levyns thought Oedera should be split up and she reassigned the species in 1948 to her new genus Eroeda, creating the new combination E. capensis. All of these names are now considered synonymous. The species name capensis refers to the Cape of Good Hope.

== Distribution and habitat ==
Oedera capensis grows on dry stony slopes and flats, roadsides and sandy areas from Albertinia to the Cape Peninsula.

== Ecology ==
In an experiment, 20% of the cypselas germinated after exposure to smoke, while without smoke only 5% sprouted.
