= Flaveria pubescens =

Scientific classification
- Kingdom: Plantae
- Clade: Tracheophytes
- Clade: Angiosperms
- Clade: Eudicots
- Clade: Asterids
- Order: Asterales
- Family: Asteraceae
- Genus: Flaveria
- Species: F. pubescens

Binomial name
- Flaveria pubescens Rydb. 1915

Synonyms
- Flaveria longifolia var. subtomentosa Greenm. & C.H.Thomps.

Species of flowering plant

Flaveria pubescens is a rare Mexican plant species of Flaveria within the family Asteraceae. It has been found only in the States of Tamaulipas and San Luis Potosí in northeastern Mexico.

Flaveria pubescens is a perennial herb up to 80 cm (31.5 in) tall. Leaves are about 5–10 cm (2.0–3.9 in) long, covered in short, soft hairs. One plant can produce numerous flower heads in a loose branching array. Each head contains 10-15 yellow disc flowers but no ray flowers.
