= Flaveria pringlei =

Scientific classification
- Kingdom: Plantae
- Clade: Tracheophytes
- Clade: Angiosperms
- Clade: Eudicots
- Clade: Asterids
- Order: Asterales
- Family: Asteraceae
- Genus: Flaveria
- Species: F. pringlei

Binomial name
- Flaveria pringlei Gand. 1918

Species of flowering plant

Flaveria pringlei is a Mexican plant species of Flaveria within the family Asteraceae. It has been found only in central Mexico, in Guerrero, Puebla, and northwestern Oaxaca.

== Description ==
Flaveria pringlei is a perennial shrub or small tree up to 400 cm (13 ft) tall. Leaves are long and narrow, up to 12 cm (4.7 in) long. One plant can produce many small flower heads in a densely packed array. Each head contains 7-9 yellow disc flowers but no visible ray flowers.
