= Oedera flavicoma =

Scientific classification
- Kingdom: Plantae
- Clade: Tracheophytes
- Clade: Angiosperms
- Clade: Eudicots
- Clade: Asterids
- Order: Asterales
- Family: Asteraceae
- Genus: Oedera
- Species: O. flavicoma

Binomial name
- Oedera flavicoma (DC.) N.G.Bergh

Synonyms
- Antithrixia flavicoma DC.

Genus of flowering plants

Oedera flavicoma is a species of flowering plant in the family Asteraceae. It is native to Cape Province in South Africa.
