= Flaveria palmeri =

Scientific classification
- Kingdom: Plantae
- Clade: Tracheophytes
- Clade: Angiosperms
- Clade: Eudicots
- Clade: Asterids
- Order: Asterales
- Family: Asteraceae
- Genus: Flaveria
- Species: F. palmeri

Binomial name
- Flaveria palmeri J.R.Johnst. 1903

Synonyms
- Flaveria intermedia J.R.Johnst.

Species of flowering plant

Flaveria palmeri is a rare Mexican plant species of Flaveria within the family Asteraceae. It has been found only in the States of Coahuila and Nuevo León in northeastern Mexico.

Flaveria palmeri grows in dry gypsum soils in the Chihuahuan Desert. It is a shrub up to 75 cm (30 in) tall. Leaves are long and narrow, up to 8 cm (3 in) long. One plant can produce numerous small yellow flower heads in loose, branching arrays. Each head contains 3-8 disc flowers plus a few ray flowers.
