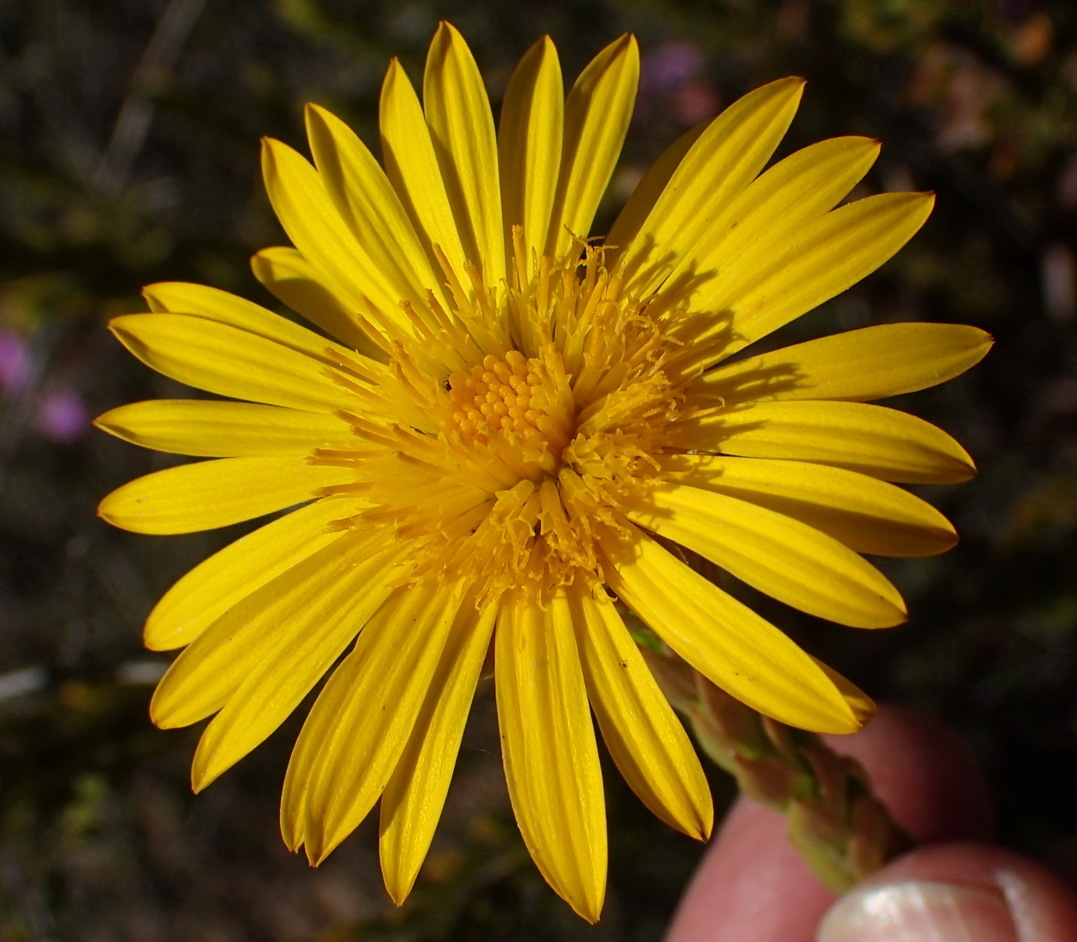

Scientific classification
- Kingdom: Plantae
- Clade: Tracheophytes
- Clade: Angiosperms
- Clade: Eudicots
- Clade: Asterids
- Order: Asterales
- Family: Asteraceae
- Genus: Oedera
- Species: O. calycina

Binomial name
- Oedera calycina (L.f.) N.G.Bergh

Synonyms
- Lapeirousia calycina (L.f.) Thunb.; Osmites calycina L.f.; Peyrousea calycina (L.f.) DC.; Relhania calycina (L.f.) L'Hér.

= Oedera calycina =

Shrublet in the daisy family from South Africa

Oedera calycina is a shrublet belonging to the daisy family (Compositae or Asteraceae). It is found in rocky Fynbos and Renosterveld vegetation, growing in rocky, loamy or sandy soil, in the Western Cape Province and Eastern Cape Province, South Africa.

== Description ==
Oedera calycina is a sparsely branched shrub that reaches a height of 1 meter, with distinctively hairy leaves, and brown papery bracts. It is a widespread and variable species though, and includes several subspecies:

=== Subspecies ===
- Subspecies calycina (lower rocky shale slopes) has leaves that are straighter, more slender, and narrowly elliptic.
- Subspecies apiculata (higher altitude mountain slopes) has glabrous (or rarely faintly haired) leaves.
- Subspecies lanceolata (low clay-calcareous soils in the Eastern Cape) has lanceolate leaves that are slightly downcurved.
