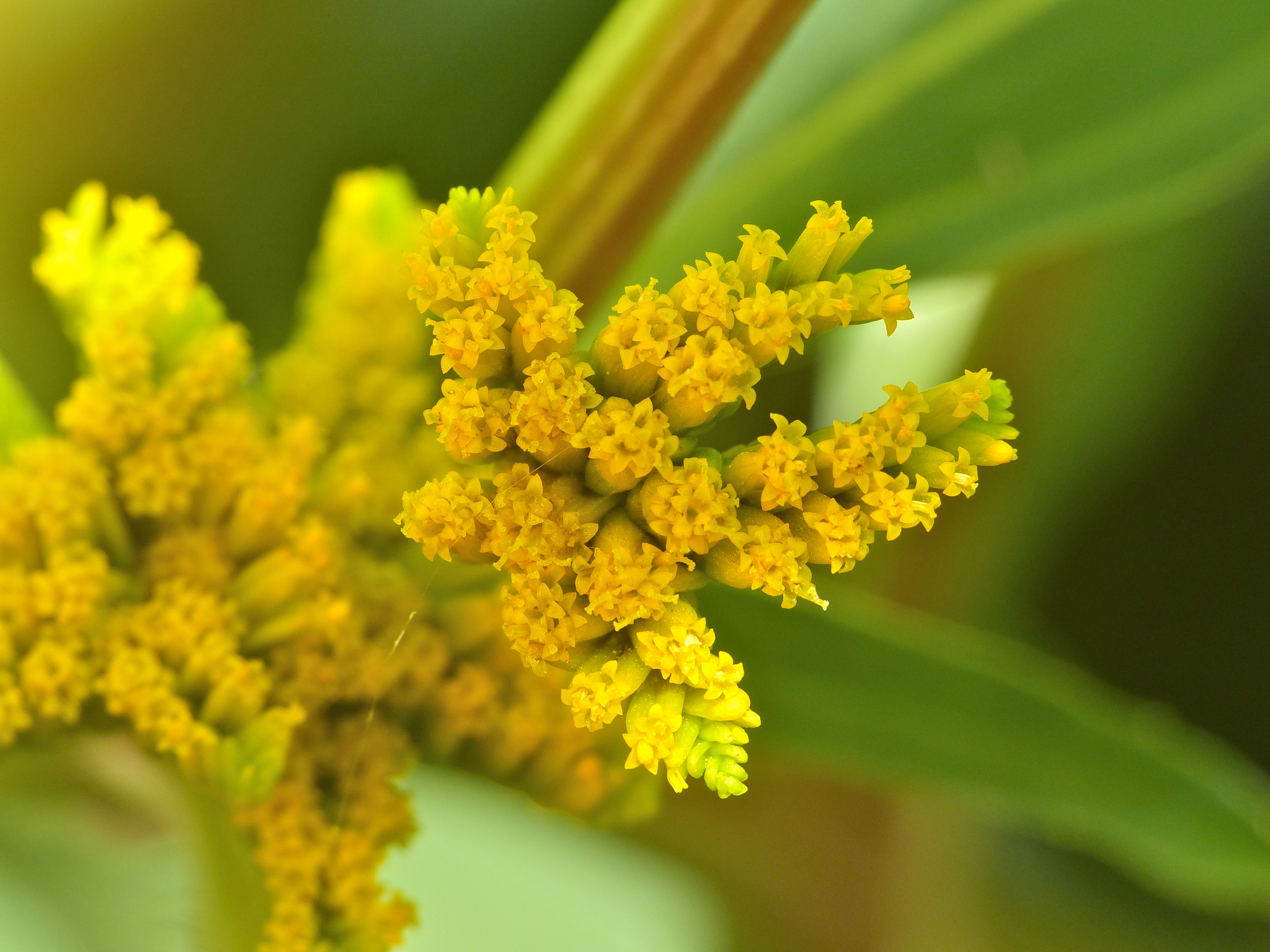

Scientific classification
- Kingdom: Plantae
- Clade: Tracheophytes
- Clade: Angiosperms
- Clade: Eudicots
- Clade: Asterids
- Order: Asterales
- Family: Asteraceae
- Genus: Flaveria
- Species: F. bidentis

Binomial name
- Flaveria bidentis (L.) Kuntze 1898 not B.L.Rob. 1907

Synonyms
- Synonymy: Ethulia bidentis L. 1767; Flaveria bonariensis DC.; Flaveria capitata Juss.; Flaveria chilensis Juss.; Flaveria chilensis (Molina) J.F.Gmel.; Flaveria contrayerba (Cav.) Pers.; Milleria chiloensis Ruiz & Pav. ex Juss.; Milleria contrayerba Cav.; Vermifuga corumbosa Ruiz & Pav.; Vermifuga corymbosa Ruiz & Pav.

= Flaveria bidentis =

Species of flowering plant

Flaveria bidentis, the coastal plain yellowtops, is a South American plant species of Flaveria within the family Asteraceae. It is native to South America, and naturalized in many places (Mexico, Central America, the West Indies, the southeastern United States, Europe, Africa, Asia, etc.).

In the U.S. it was introduced into the states of Georgia, Alabama and Florida.

Flaveria bidentis is an annual herb up to 100 cm (39.5 in) tall. One plant can sometimes produce 100 or more flower heads in a tightly packed array. Each head contains 3-8 yellow disc flowers. Sometimes the head also contains a single yellow ray flower.
