= Flaveria vaginata =

Scientific classification
- Kingdom: Plantae
- Clade: Tracheophytes
- Clade: Angiosperms
- Clade: Eudicots
- Clade: Asterids
- Order: Asterales
- Family: Asteraceae
- Genus: Flaveria
- Species: F. vaginata

Binomial name
- Flaveria vaginata B.L.Rob. & Greenm.

Species of flowering plant

Flaveria vaginata is a very rare Mexican plant species of Flaveria within the family Asteraceae. It has been found only in two locations in central Mexico, one in northwestern Oaxaca, the other in southwestern Puebla.

Flaveria vaginata is distinguished from related species in the genus by its dense woolly pubescence on the upper leaves, and by the fact that the flower heads are concentrated into dense hemispherical clumps.
