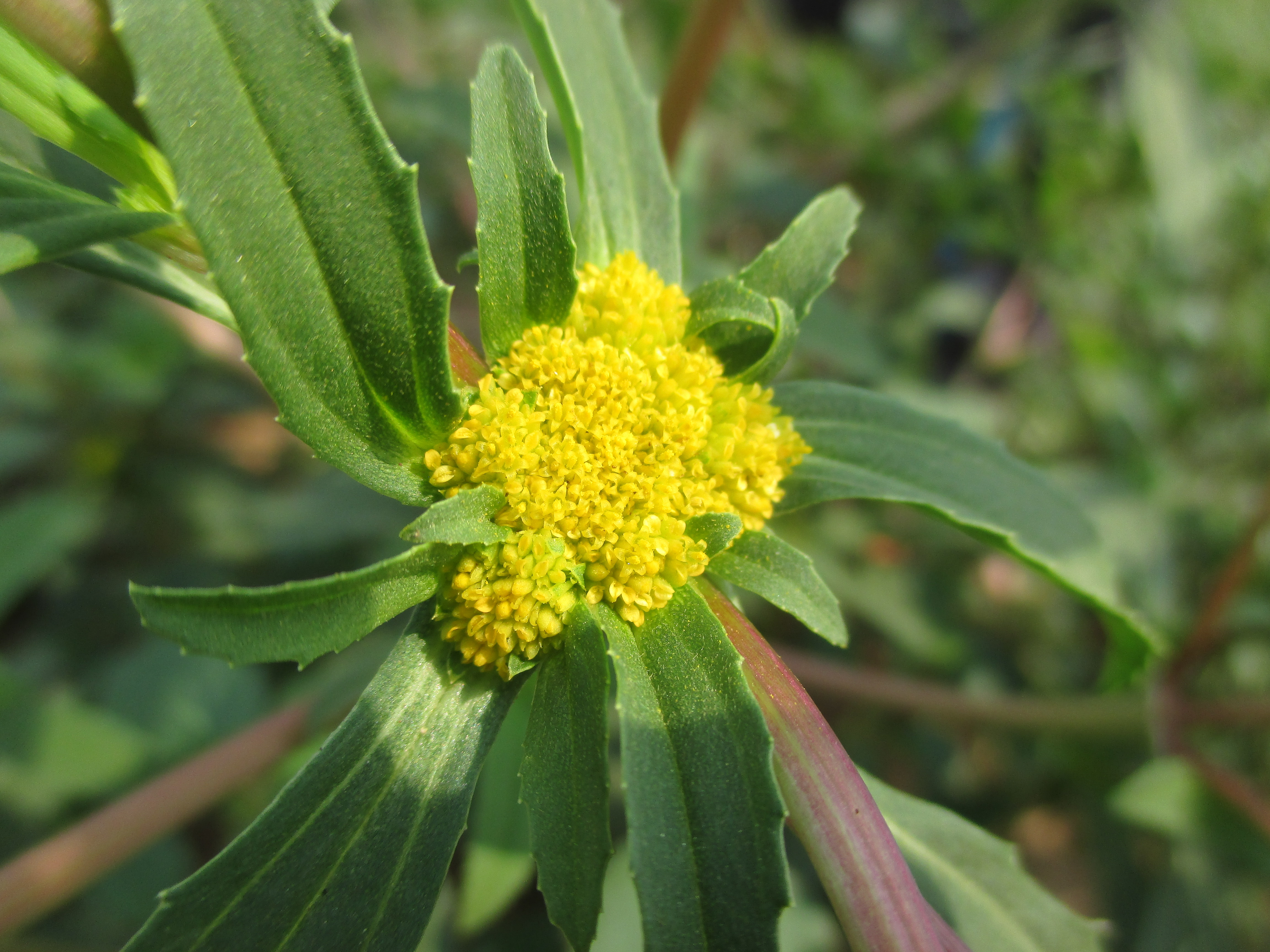

Conservation status
- Apparently Secure (NatureServe)

Scientific classification
- Kingdom: Plantae
- Clade: Tracheophytes
- Clade: Angiosperms
- Clade: Eudicots
- Clade: Asterids
- Order: Asterales
- Family: Asteraceae
- Genus: Flaveria
- Species: F. campestris

Binomial name
- Flaveria campestris J.R.Johnst.

Synonyms
- Flaveria angustifolia A.Gray 1849 not (Cav.) Pers. 1807; Flaveria integrifolia Moc. & Sessé ex DC.; Flaveria radicans Moc. & Sessé ex DC.

= Flaveria campestris =

Species of flowering plant

Flaveria campestris, common name alkali yellowtops, is a plant species native to the southwestern United States and to the southern Great Plains (Arizona, Utah, New Mexico, Colorado, Texas, Missouri, Kansas, Oklahoma). It is found on saline soils and on the margins of lakes, ponds and streams.

Flaveria campestris is an annal herb up to 90 cm (3 feet) tall. It produces a tightly packed corymb of up to 100 small flower heads. Flowers are yellow, sometimes lacking ray flowers, other times with only a single ray flower per head. Each head has 5-8 disc flowers.
