= Flaveria anomala =

Scientific classification
- Kingdom: Plantae
- Clade: Tracheophytes
- Clade: Angiosperms
- Clade: Eudicots
- Clade: Asterids
- Order: Asterales
- Family: Asteraceae
- Genus: Flaveria
- Species: F. anomala

Binomial name
- Flaveria anomala B.L.Rob. 1892

Species of flowering plant

Flaveria anomala is a Mexican plant species of yellowtops within the family Asteraceae. It has been found only in northeastern Mexico, in Coahuila, San Luis Potosí, Tamaulipas, Nuevo León, and Zacatecas.

Flaveria anomala is a perennial herb up to 100 cm (39 in) tall. Leaves are long and narrow, up to 12 cm (4.7 in) long. One plant can produce numerous flower heads in a dense spiral array. Each head contains 5-7 yellow disc flowers. some heads contain no ray flowers but other heads in the same cluster may have one yellow ray flower.
