= Flaveria ramosissima =

Scientific classification
- Kingdom: Plantae
- Clade: Tracheophytes
- Clade: Angiosperms
- Clade: Eudicots
- Clade: Asterids
- Order: Asterales
- Family: Asteraceae
- Genus: Flaveria
- Species: F. ramosissima

Binomial name
- Flaveria ramosissima Klatt 1887

Synonyms
- Flaveria angustifolia var. ramosissima Klatt

Species of flowering plant

Flaveria ramosissima is a rare Mexican plant species of Flaveria within the family Asteraceae. It has been found only in the States of Puebla and Oaxaca in central Mexico.

Flaveria ramosissima is an annual herb up to 50 cm (20 in) tall. Leaves are narrow, up to 5 cm (2.0 in) long. One plant can produce numerous small flower heads in loose, branching arrays. Each head contains 5-10 disc flowers and sometimes one ray flower.
