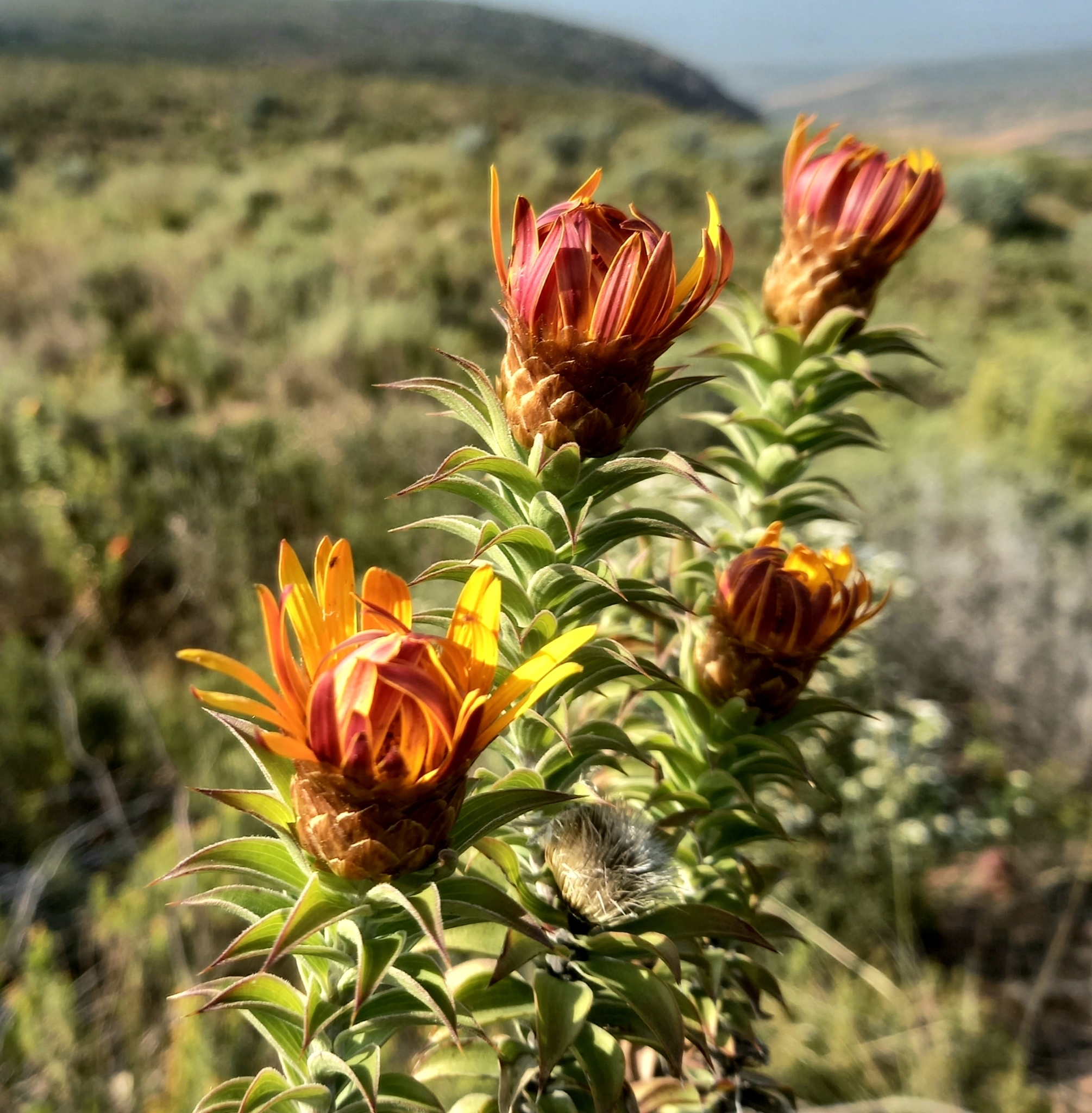

Scientific classification
- Kingdom: Plantae
- Clade: Tracheophytes
- Clade: Angiosperms
- Clade: Eudicots
- Clade: Asterids
- Order: Asterales
- Family: Asteraceae
- Genus: Oedera
- Species: O. speciosa

Binomial name
- Oedera speciosa (DC.) N.G.Bergh

Synonyms
- Eclopes speciosa DC.; Relhania speciosa (DC.) Harv.; Eclopes buxifolia Gaertn.; Eclopes schizolepis DC.; Eclopes styphelioides DC.; Relhania styphelioides Harv.

= Oedera speciosa =

Shrublet in the daisy family from South Africa

Oedera speciosa is a shrublet belonging to the family Asteraceae, indigenous to the southern Cape, South Africa.

== Description ==
Oedera speciosa is a shrub that reaches a height of 1-2 meters (the tallest in its genus), with stiff, recurved leaves. The leaves have distinctive lines on their underside, and smooth upper surface.

== Distribution ==
It occurs in rocky, mountainous Fynbos vegetation, in the southern regions of the Western Cape Province and Eastern Cape Province, South Africa.
