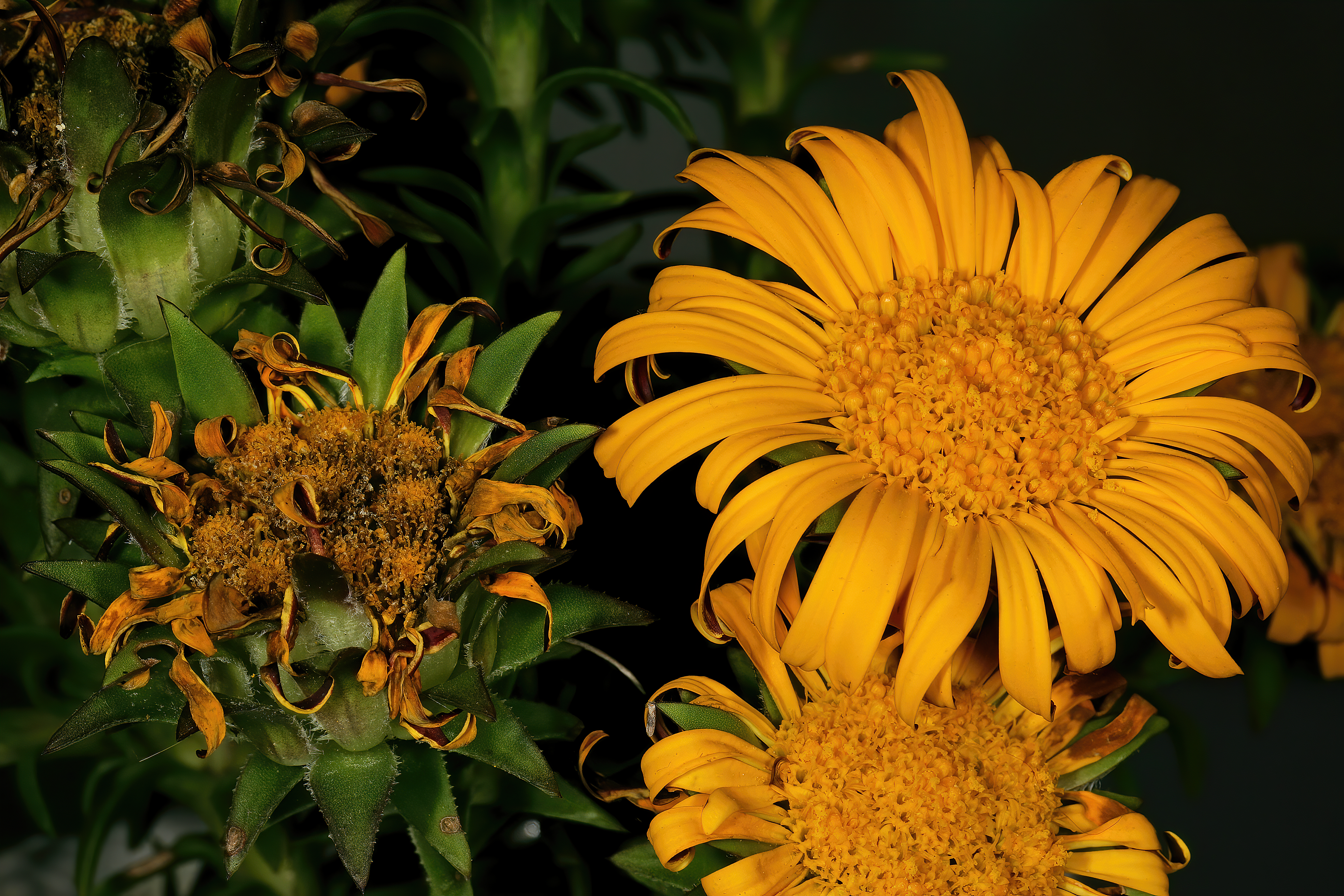

Scientific classification
- Kingdom: Plantae
- Clade: Tracheophytes
- Clade: Angiosperms
- Clade: Eudicots
- Clade: Asterids
- Order: Asterales
- Family: Asteraceae
- Genus: Oedera
- Species: O. imbricata

Binomial name
- Oedera imbricata Lam.

Synonyms
- Relhania imbricata

= Oedera imbricata =

Shrublet in the daisy family from South Africa

Oedera imbricata is a prickly shrublet belonging to the family Asteraceae.

It is indigenous to the southern Cape region of South Africa, where it occurs in Fynbos and Renosterveld vegetation, from the West Coast, eastwards as far as Grahamstown.

== Description ==
Oedera imbricata is a small (50 cm high), sprawling shrublet. The leaves are small (15 x 5 mm), hard and stiff, with a prominent midrib. They grow densely packed along the stems.

The yellow flowerheads appear in Spring. They are 40mm wide, consist of more than one individual flowerheads (a diagnostic character), of which the outer ones have visible ray-florets.

=== Related species ===
It resembles Oedera capensis, which however has longer, spreading, marginally-toothed leaves.
