= Oedera montana =

Scientific classification
- Kingdom: Plantae
- Clade: Tracheophytes
- Clade: Angiosperms
- Clade: Eudicots
- Clade: Asterids
- Order: Asterales
- Family: Asteraceae
- Genus: Oedera
- Species: O. montana

Binomial name
- Oedera montana (Bolus) N.G.Bergh

Synonyms
- Leysera montana Bolus; Oreoleysera montana (Bolus) K.Bremer

Genus of flowering plants

Oedera montana is a species of South African flowering plants in the family Asteraceae. It is endemic to the Cape Provinces. It was once assigned to the genus Oreoleysera, and was the only species recognized in that genus.
