= Flaveria sonorensis =

Scientific classification
- Kingdom: Plantae
- Clade: Tracheophytes
- Clade: Angiosperms
- Clade: Eudicots
- Clade: Asterids
- Order: Asterales
- Family: Asteraceae
- Genus: Flaveria
- Species: F. sonorensis

Binomial name
- Flaveria sonorensis A.M.Powell

Species of flowering plant

Flaveria sonorensis is a rare Mexican plant species of Flaveria within the family Asteraceae. It has been found only in southern Sonora and southwestern Chihuahua in northwestern Mexico. Some of the populations lie very close to hot mineral springs.

Flaveria sonorensis is a perennial herb up to 100 cm (39 in) tall. Leaves are long and narrow, up to 14 cm (5.5 in) long. One plant will produce numerous small flower heads in flat-topped clusters, each head with 5-7 disc flowers and sometimes a single ray flower.
