= Flaveria australasica =

Scientific classification
- Kingdom: Plantae
- Clade: Tracheophytes
- Clade: Angiosperms
- Clade: Eudicots
- Clade: Asterids
- Order: Asterales
- Family: Asteraceae
- Genus: Flaveria
- Species: F. australasica

Binomial name
- Flaveria australasica Hook.

Species of flowering plant

Flaveria australasica is an Australian plant species of yellowtops within the family Asteraceae. It has been found in New South Wales, Queensland, South Australia, Western Australia, and Northern Territory.

Flaveria australasica is very similar and possibly closely related to F. trinervia. Some authors treat the two as distinct species while others consider F. australasica as a synonym of F. trinervia.
