= Flaveria mcdougallii =

Conservation status
- Imperiled (NatureServe)

Scientific classification
- Kingdom: Plantae
- Clade: Tracheophytes
- Clade: Angiosperms
- Clade: Eudicots
- Clade: Asterids
- Order: Asterales
- Family: Asteraceae
- Genus: Flaveria
- Species: F. mcdougallii

Binomial name
- Flaveria mcdougallii M.E.Theroux, Pinkava & D.J.Keil

Species of flowering plant

Flaveria mcdougallii is a very rare North American plant species of Flaveria within the family Asteraceae. It has been found in 4 locations in the Grand Canyon in northwestern Arizona in the southwestern United States, in Mohave County and Coconino County. Many of the populations lie inside Grand Canyon National Park, others within the Hualapai Indian Reservation.

Flaveria mcdougallii grows primarily near alkaline springs and springs along the Colorado River. It is a hairless subshrub up to 50 cm (20 in) tall. One plant can sometimes produce 200 or more small yellow flower heads in a flat-topped cluster. Each head contains 2–6 disc flowers but no ray flowers.
