= Flaveria robusta =

Scientific classification
- Kingdom: Plantae
- Clade: Tracheophytes
- Clade: Angiosperms
- Clade: Eudicots
- Clade: Asterids
- Order: Asterales
- Family: Asteraceae
- Genus: Flaveria
- Species: F. robusta

Binomial name
- Flaveria robusta Rose

Species of flowering plant

Flaveria robusta is a rare Mexican plant species of Flaveria within the family Asteraceae. It has been found only in Colima and nearby western Michoacán in west-central Mexico.

Flaveria robusta is a shrub up to 170 cm (68 inches or 5 2/3 feet) tall. One plant can produce numerous small flower heads in loose, branching arrays. Each head contains about 7 disc flowers but no ray flowers.
