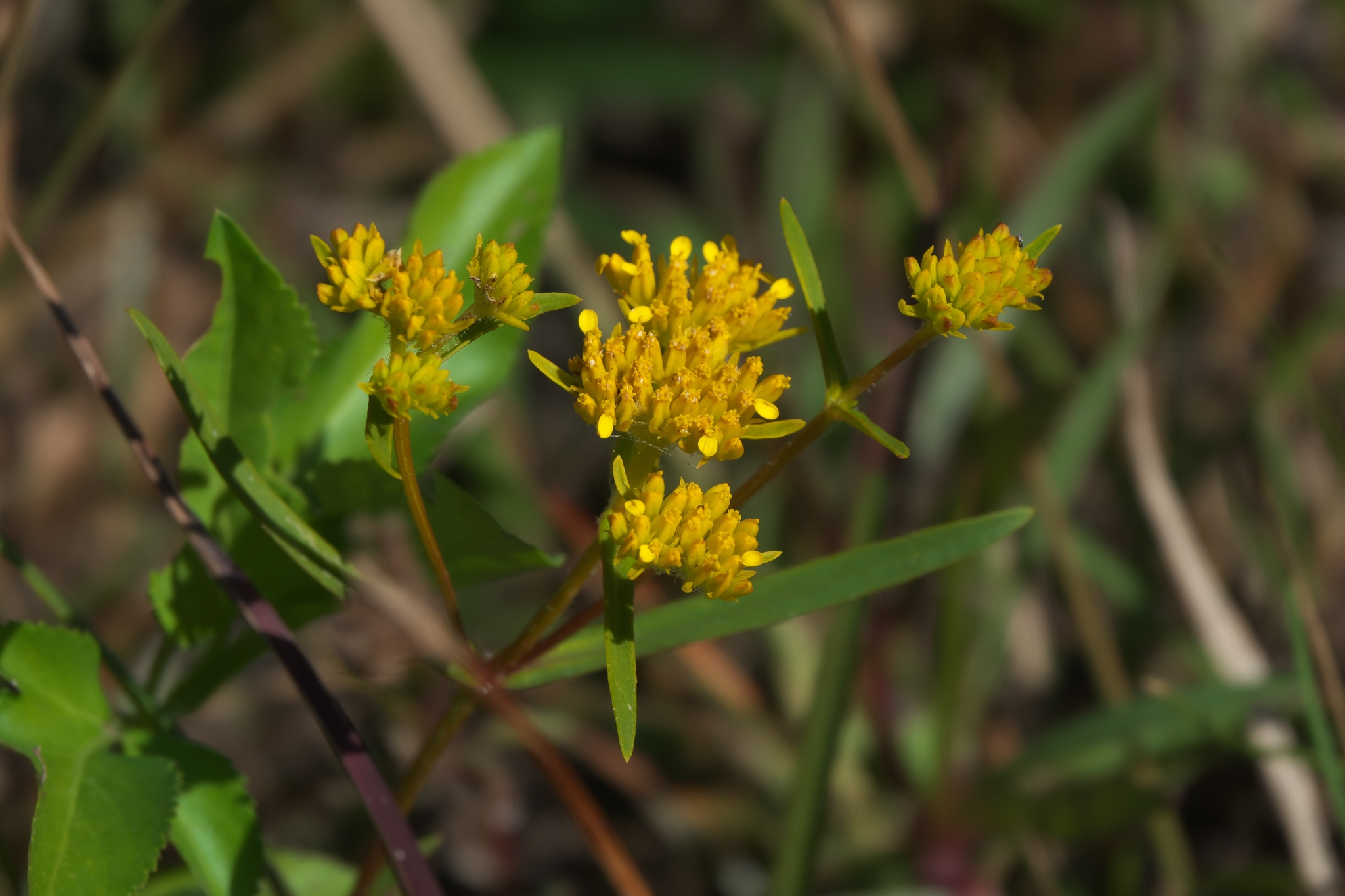

Scientific classification
- Kingdom: Plantae
- Clade: Tracheophytes
- Clade: Angiosperms
- Clade: Eudicots
- Clade: Asterids
- Order: Asterales
- Family: Asteraceae
- Genus: Flaveria
- Species: F. floridana

Binomial name
- Flaveria floridana J.R.Johnst. 1903

Synonyms
- Flaveria pinetorum S.F.Blake

= Flaveria floridana =

Species of flowering plant

Flaveria floridana, the Florida yellowtops, is a North American plant species of Flaveria within the family Asteraceae. It has been found only along the Gulf Coast of Florida between Clearwater and Marco Island, mostly in the Tampa Bay region.

Flaveria floridana is a perennial herb up to 120 cm (3.9 ft) tall. Leaves are long and narrow, up to 14 cm (5.5 in) long. One plant can sometimes produce as many as 100 flower heads in a tightly packed array. Each head contains 9-14 yellow disc flowers. Sometimes it produces a single yellow ray flower as well.
