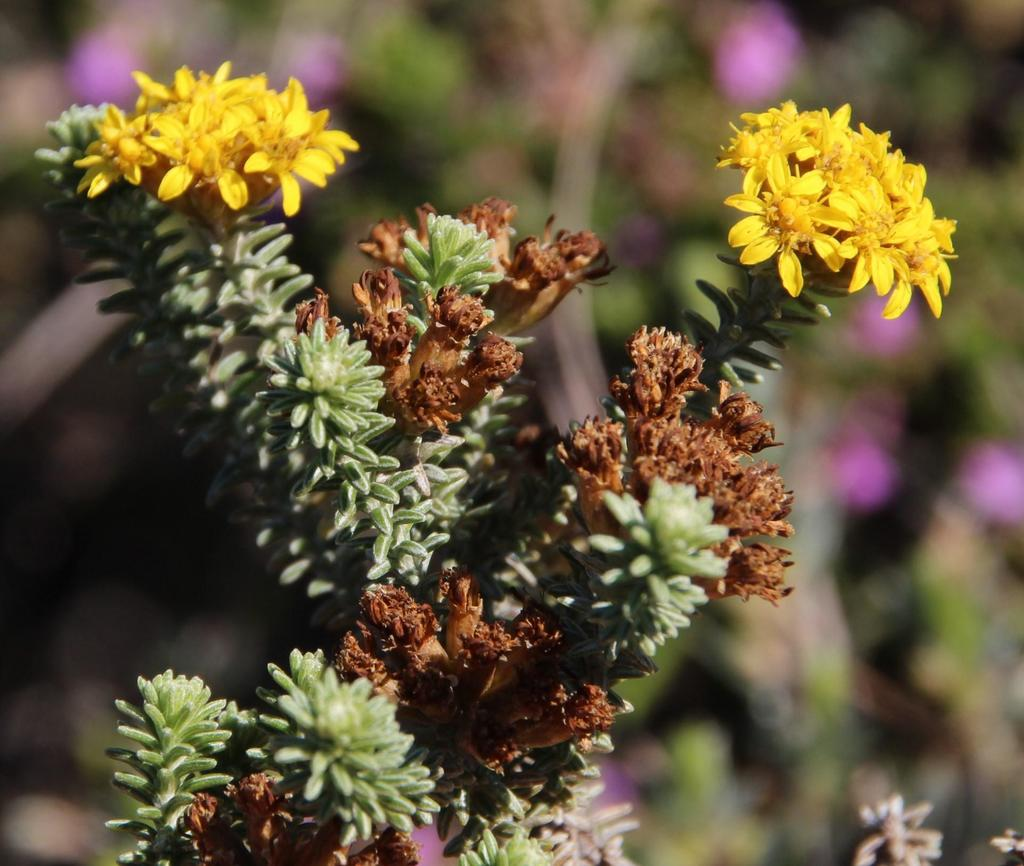

Scientific classification
- Kingdom: Plantae
- Clade: Tracheophytes
- Clade: Angiosperms
- Clade: Eudicots
- Clade: Asterids
- Order: Asterales
- Family: Asteraceae
- Genus: Oedera
- Species: O. garnotii

Binomial name
- Oedera garnotii (Less.) N.G.Bergh

Synonyms
- Nestlera garnotii (Less.) Harv.; Polychaetia garnotii Less.; Relhania garnotii (Less.) K.Bremer; Nestlera tenuifolia DC.

= Oedera garnotii =

Shrublet in the daisy family from South Africa

Oedera garnotii is a shrublet belonging to the daisy family (Compositae or Asteraceae), indigenous to the southern Overberg region of the Western Cape Province, South Africa.

== Description ==
Oedera garnotii is a small shrublet, with short, ericoid leaves and flowerheads composed in terminal cymes.

== Distribution ==
It is endemic to the Overberg region of the Western Cape Province, South Africa, where it occurs on silcrete, but also in flat, coastal sandy or clay Renosterveld vegetation, between the towns of Bredasdorp and Mossel Bay.
