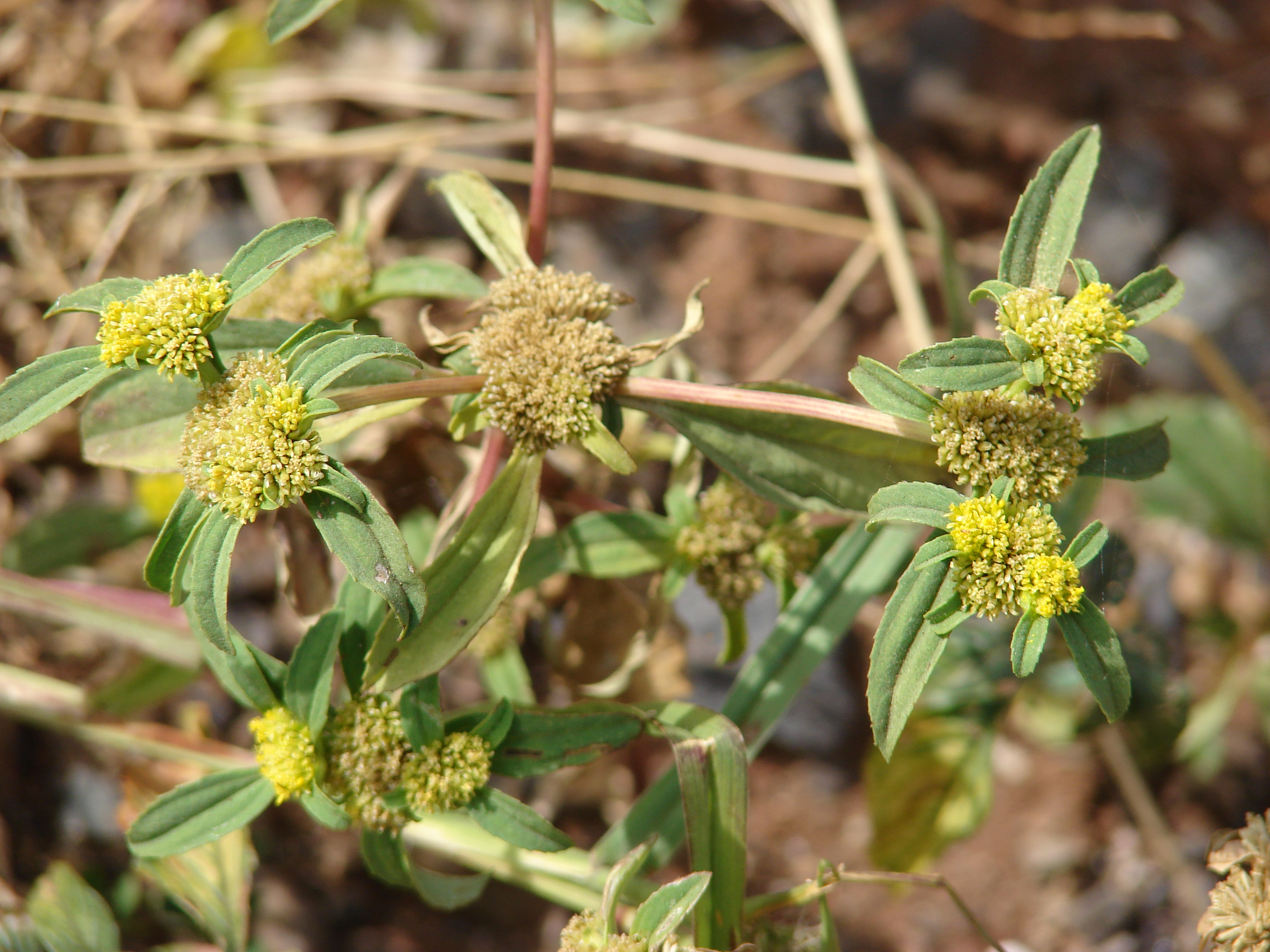
- Flaveria trinervia

Scientific classification
- Kingdom: Plantae
- Clade: Embryophytes
- Clade: Tracheophytes
- Clade: Angiosperms
- Clade: Eudicots
- Clade: Asterids
- Order: Asterales
- Family: Asteraceae
- Subfamily: Asteroideae
- Tribe: Tageteae
- Subtribe: Flaveriinae
- Genus: Flaveria; Juss. 1789 not J.F.Gmel. 1792

Synonyms
- Dilepis Suess. & Merxm.; Vermifuga Ruiz & Pav.; Nauenburgia Willd.; Brotera Spreng. 1801 illegitimate homonym not Cav. 1799 (Malvaceae)

= Flaveria =

Yellowtops

Genus of flowering plants

Flaveria is a genus of plants in the family Asteraceae. They are sometimes called yellowtops. Some are annual or perennial herbs and some are shrubs. They bear yellow flowers in heads, with zero, one, or two ray florets in each head. These plants are found in the Americas, Asia, Africa, and Australia.

While some members of this genus use the more common C_{3} carbon fixation pathway, others are C_{4} plants, and some are intermediate. With closely related species exhibiting different forms of metabolism, Flaveria has been a model genus for studies on the evolution of photosynthesis. A monograph by A.M. Powell from 1978 is the most comprehensive study of morphology and biogeography for the Flaveria species to date. Molecular phylogenetic studies have clarified many of the evolutionary relationships between Flaveria species.

Species

- Flaveria angustifolia - Mexico (Oaxaca, Puebla, Guerrero); C_{3}–C_{4} intermediate
- Flaveria anomala - Mexico (San Luis Potosí, Nuevo León, Durango, Zacatecas)
- Flaveria australasica - speedyweed - Australia; C_{4}
- Flaveria bidentis - coastal plain yellowtops - South America, Galápagos, West Indies, United States (Florida Georgia Alabama); C_{4}
- Flaveria brownii - Brown's yellowtops - southern Texas; C_{4}-like
- Flaveria campestris - alkali yellowtops - USA (Arizona New Mexico Texas Utah Colorado Kansas Missouri Indiana)
- Flaveria chlorifolia - clasping yellowtops - Mexico (Chihuahua), New Mexico Texas; C_{3}–C_{4} intermediate
- Flaveria cronquistii - Mexico (Oaxaca, Puebla)
- Flaveria floridana - Florida yellowtops - Florida; C_{3}–C_{4} intermediate
- Flaveria haumanii - Chile, Argentina
- Flaveria intermedia - Mexico (Durango)
- Flaveria kochiana - Mexico (Oaxaca); C_{4}
- Flaveria linearis - narrowleaf yellowtops - Cuba, Bahamas, Florida, Yucatán Peninsula
- Flaveria maritima Kunth
- Flaveria mcdougallii Theroux, Pinkava & D.J.Keil
- Flaveria oppositifolia - Mexico (Chihuahua, Coahuila, Hidalgo, Nuevo León, San Luis Potosí), Texas
- Flaveria palmeri - Mexico (Coahuila); C_{4}-like
- Flaveria pringlei - Mexico (Puebla, Oaxaca, Guerrero)
- Flaveria pubescens - Mexico (San Luis Potosí, Tamaulipas); C_{3}–C_{4} intermediate
- Flaveria ramosissima - Mexico (Puebla, Oaxaca); C_{3}–C_{4} intermediate
- Flaveria robusta - Mexico (Colima)
- Flaveria sonorensis - Mexico (Chihuahua, Sonora); C_{3}–C_{4} intermediate
- Flaveria trinervia - clustered yellowtops - Mexico, Belize, South America, West Indies, California Arizona New Mexico Texas Missouri Florida South Carolina Virginia Maryland Massachusetts); C_{4}
- Flaveria vaginata B.L.Rob. & Greenm.; C_{4}-like
