= Flaveria brownii =

Scientific classification
- Kingdom: Plantae
- Clade: Tracheophytes
- Clade: Angiosperms
- Clade: Eudicots
- Clade: Asterids
- Order: Asterales
- Family: Asteraceae
- Genus: Flaveria
- Species: F. brownii

Binomial name
- Flaveria brownii A.M.Powell

Species of flowering plant

Flaveria brownii, or Brown's yellowtops, is a North American plant species of Flaveria within the family Asteraceae. It is found only in the coastal regions of southern Texas in the United States. It grows primarily in sand dunes and salt marshes.

Flaveria brownii is a perennial herb up to 70 cm (27.5 in) tall. Stems sometimes grow straight up, sometimes reclining on the ground. Leaves are long and narrow, up to 12 cm (4.5 in) long. One plant can sometimes produce 100 or more flower heads in a loose, branching array, each head with 5-10 yellow disc flowers. Sometimes the head also contains one single ray flower.
