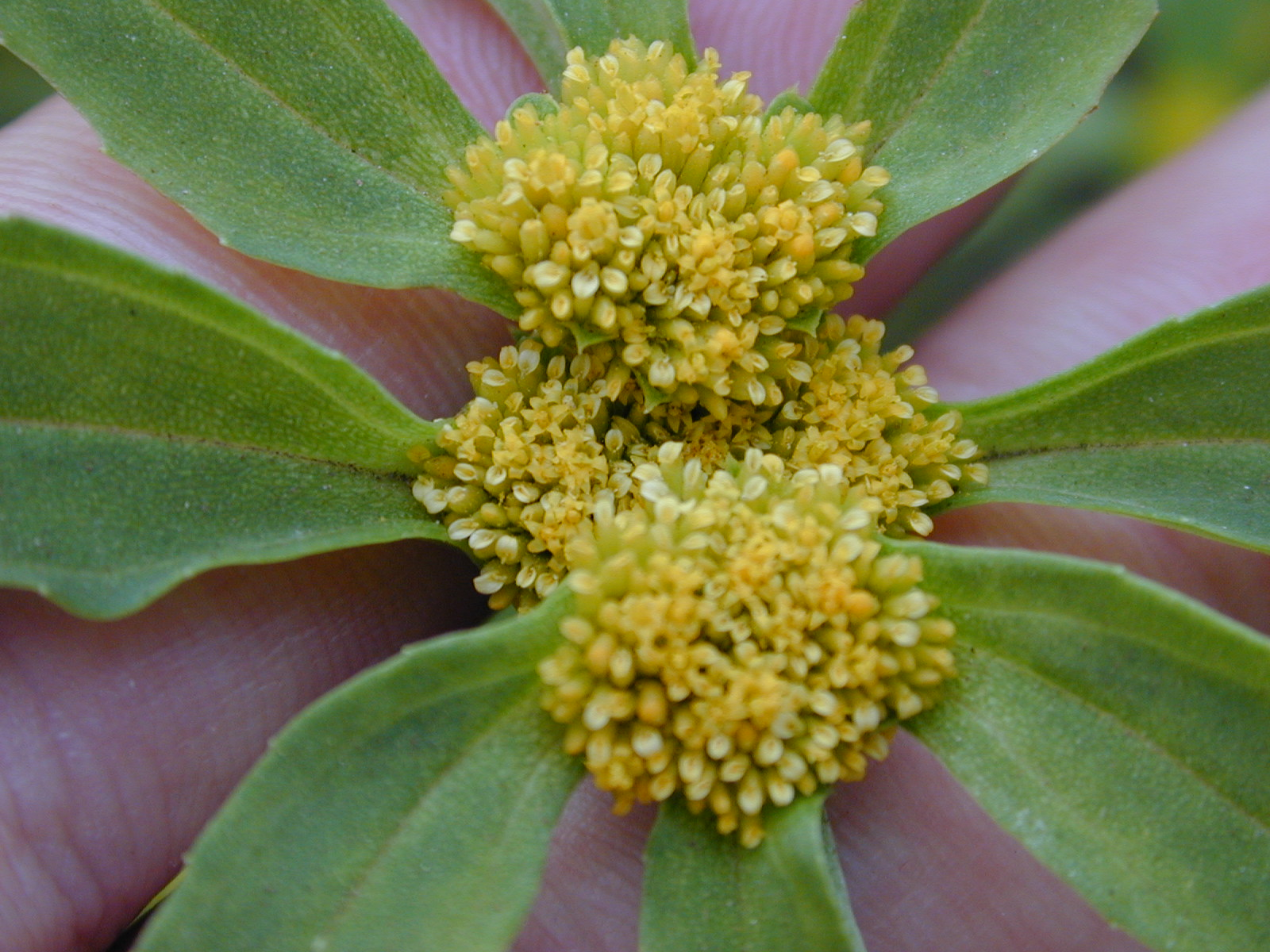

Scientific classification
- Kingdom: Plantae
- Clade: Tracheophytes
- Clade: Angiosperms
- Clade: Eudicots
- Clade: Asterids
- Order: Asterales
- Family: Asteraceae
- Genus: Flaveria
- Species: F. trinervia

Binomial name
- Flaveria trinervia (Spreng.) C.Mohr

Synonyms
- Synonymy: Brotera contrayerba Spreng.; Brotera sprengelii Cass.; Brotera trinervata (Willd.) Pers.; Eupatorium chilense Molina; Flaveria repanda Lag.; Flaveria trinervata (Willd.) Baill.; Oedera trinervia Spreng.

= Flaveria trinervia =

Species of flowering plant

Flaveria trinervia is a species of flowering plant in the family Asteraceae known by the common names clustered yellowtops, speedyweed, and yellow twinstem. It is native to parts of the Americas, including the southeastern and southwestern United States (Florida, Texas, Arizona, New Mexico), most of the Bahamas, Mexico, Belize, and parts of the Caribbean, especially Cuba, Cayman Islands, Jamaica, Hispaniola, Puerto Rico and Barbados. It is also known in many other places as an introduced species and often a noxious weed, such as in Hawaii.

Flaveria trinervia grows easily in many types of wet habitats, including saline and alkaline soils and highly disturbed habitat. This is an annual herb growing erect and known to exceed two meters (7 feet) in height. The lance-shaped to oval leaves are each up to 15 centimeters (8 inches) long and arranged oppositely in pairs around the stem, their bases sometimes fused together. The edges of the leaves generally have tiny widely spaced teeth. The inflorescence is a large dense cluster of many very small flower heads, sometimes over 300 in one cluster. Each flower head contains 0-1 yellow or whitish ray floret and 0-2 yellow disc florets.

This plant exhibits C_{4} carbon fixation. Phototoxic secondary metabolites have been found in the flower head of (Asteraceae) Flaveria trinervia and bark of Simira salvadorensis.

The Australian species F. australasica is very similar and possibly closely related to F. trinervia. Some authors treat the two as distinct species while others consider F. australasica as a synonym of F. trinervia.
