= Steamboats of the Colorado River =

Overview of steamboats on the Colorado River

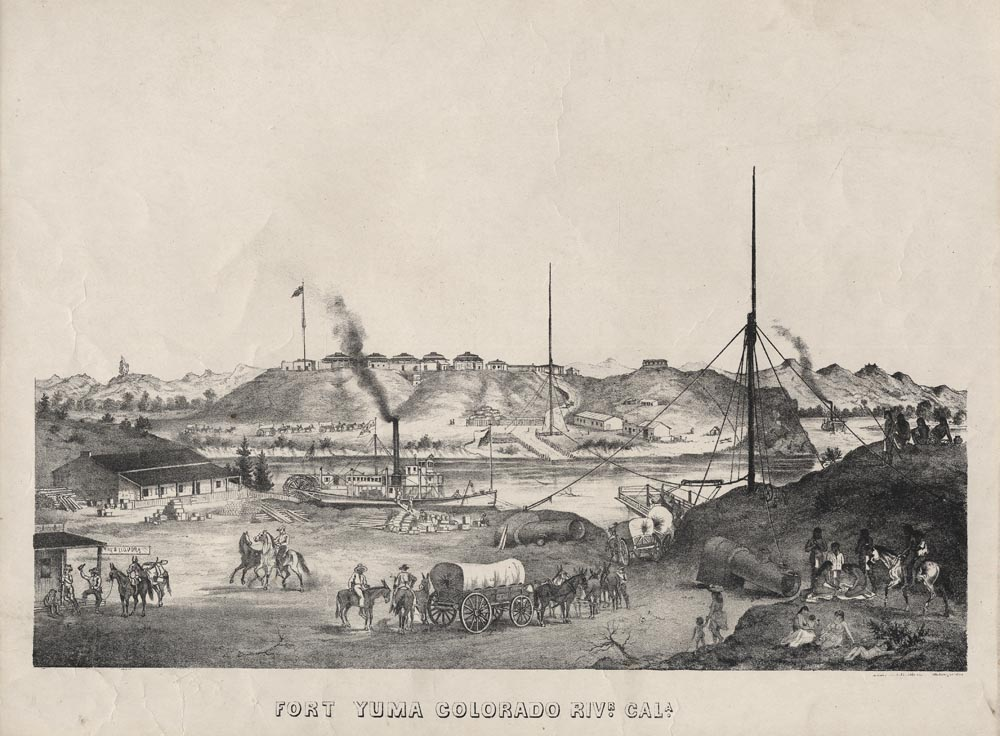
Yuma and Fort Yuma across the Colorado River (circa 1875 lithograph). Steamboat is downriver from the ferry crossing that is equipped with masts on both banks to raise the ferry's tow cables above the smokestacks of passing steamboats. Note two of the cables holding the mast up are tied to discarded boilers, presumably taken out of George A. Johnson & Company or Colorado Steam Navigation Company (C.S.N.C) steamboats when they were rebuilt or dismantled here.

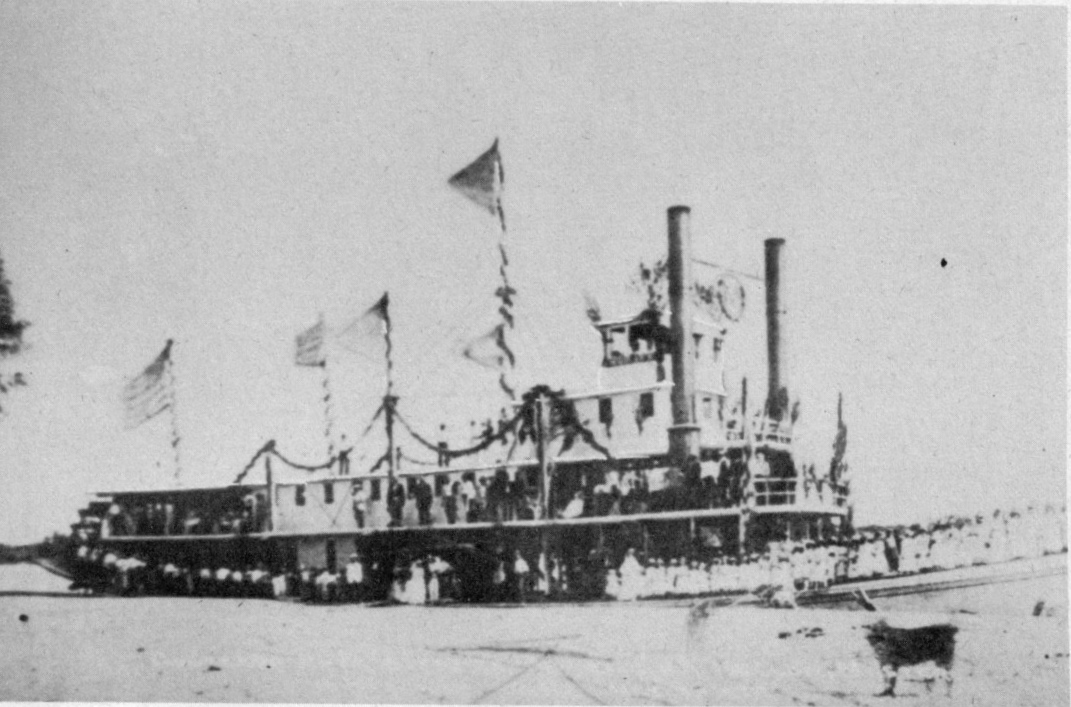
Mohave II at Yuma, Arizona, with Sunday school group embarked, 1876. Mohave, the second stern-wheel steamboat of that name running on the Colorado River for the Colorado Steam Navigation Company (C.S.N.C) between 1876 and 1900. It was the first and only double smokestack steamboat to run on the river.

Steamboats on the Colorado River operated from the river mouth at the Colorado River Delta on the Gulf of California in Mexico, up to the Virgin River on the Lower Colorado River Valley in the Southwestern United States from 1852 until 1909, when the construction of the Laguna Dam was completed. The shallow draft paddle steamers were found to be the most economical way to ship goods between the Pacific Ocean ports and settlements and mines along the lower river, putting in at landings in Sonora state, Baja California Territory, California state, Arizona Territory, New Mexico Territory, and Nevada state. They remained the primary means of transportation of freight until the advent of the more economical railroads began cutting away at their business from 1878 when the first line entered Arizona Territory.

Steamboats were tried on the upper Colorado River: in Glen Canyon; on the Green River in Utah and Wyoming; and on the Grand River, (renamed as the upper part of the Colorado River after 1921), above its confluence with the Green River in Utah and in Colorado. These attempts in the late 19th century and early 20th century met with little success.

== History ==
=== Early Steamboats on the Colorado River ===
==== Fort Yuma's supply difficulties ====
The beginnings of the use of steamboats on the Colorado River came as the result of the founding of Fort Yuma during the Yuma War. Supplies had to be shipped over long distance from San Francisco to San Diego then overland through the Peninsular Ranges via Warner Pass to Depot Vallecito then 113 miles (182 km) across the arid Colorado Desert to the fort. Costs of such transport was minimally $500 per ton. Supplying the fort became so difficult, that for a time it had to be abandoned.

Attempts had been made by the Army to bring supplies the 150 miles (240 km) up from the Gulf of California. First in November 1850 to January 1851, by its transport schooner, Invincible under Captain Alfred H. Wilcox and then by its longboat commanded by Lieutenant George Derby. Later Lieutenant Derby, in his expedition report, recommended that a shallow draft sternwheel steamboat would be the way to send supplies up river to the fort.

The next attempt was made by the contractors George Alonzo Johnson with his partner Benjamin M. Hartshorne who arrived at the river's mouth in February 1852, on the United States transport schooner Sierra Nevada under Captain Wilcox. On board were 250 tons of supplies for the newly reoccupied fort and a pair of knocked down flatboats, built by Domingo Marcucci in San Francisco. These they assembled to be poled up the Colorado. However the first barge sank with its cargo a total loss. The second was finally, after a long struggle poled up to Fort Yuma, but what little it carried was soon consumed by the garrison. Subsequently wagons again were sent from the fort to haul the balance of the supplies overland from the estuary through the marshes and woodlands of the Delta.

Both of these attempts on the river failed in the face of extreme tides in the estuary or strong currents, shifting sand bars or low water in the river. Hauling supplies from the estuary worked but was less satisfactory than the 185 mile San Diego route over land. Firstly it was a violation of the Treaty of Guadalupe Hidalgo for American troops to intrude into Mexican territory. Secondly, on top of already costly land shipping was the prospect of the additional expense of Mexican custom duties that would be levied on anything landed on Mexican territory.

==== James Turnbull and the Uncle Sam ====
In November 1852, the Uncle Sam, a 65-foot long side-wheel paddle steamer, also built by Domingo Marcucci, became the first steamboat on the Colorado River. It was brought by the schooner Capacity from San Francisco to the delta by the next contractor to supply the fort, Captain James Turnbull. It was assembled and launched in the estuary, 30 miles (48 km) above the mouth of the Colorado River. Equipped with only a 20 horsepower engine, the Uncle Sam could only carry 35 tons of supplies, taking 15 days to make the first 120 mile trip. It made many trips up and down the river, taking four months to finish carrying the supplies for the fort, improving its time up river to 12 days. Negligence caused it to sink at its dock below Fort Yuma, and was then washed away before it could be raised, in the spring flood of 1853. Turnbull who meanwhile had returned to the Delta from San Francisco with another cargo and a more powerful engine for the Uncle Sam. He returned for a new hull, while the army sent wagons to recover the cargo from the delta again. However, Turnbull in financial difficulty, disappeared from the city leaving creditors unpaid. Nevertheless, Turnbull had shown the worth of steamboats to solve Fort Yuma's supply problem.

==== George A. Johnson & Company ====
In late 1852, George Alonzo Johnson with his partner Hartshorne and a new partner Captain Alfred H. Wilcox (formerly of the Invincible and Sierra Nevada), formed George A. Johnson & Company and obtained the next contract to supply the fort. Johnson and his partners, all having learned a lesson from their failed attempts ascending the Colorado and with the example of the Uncle Sam, brought the parts of a more powerful side-wheel steamboat, the General Jesup, with them to the mouth of the Colorado from San Francisco. There it was reassembled at a landing in the upper tidewater of the river and reached Fort Yuma, January 18, 1854. This new boat, capable of carrying 50 tons of cargo, was very successful making round trips from the estuary to the fort in only four or five days. Costs were cut to $75 per ton.

A second reason for the speed of the new steamboat beside its powerful engine was the establishment of the wood-yards along the river between the delta and Fort Yuma. The landings sprang up to supply wood for the steamboats, so the crew would not need to gather wood as they proceeded up river, as the crew of the Uncle Sam had been obliged to do. These landings were each located at about the distance a steamboat could travel up and down river each day on that section of river. Steamboats did not travel at night, due to the danger of running onto sandbars or into snags on the ever changing river. The boats would be refueled at the landings while tied up overnight. The wood-yards were owned by Yankees, who hired the Cocopah from local rancherias, to cut the wood (usually cottonwood or mesquite), transport it to the wood-yards and load it onto the boats. Cocopah men often also served as deck hands on the boats.

Lower Colorado River Distances from mouth to Fort Yuma
Location	Distance
Philips Point, Sonora; Head of eastern dis-tributary channel of the Colorado River.	5 mi (8.0 km)
Port Isabel Slough from 1865; Port Isabel, Sonora 1867–1878; Steamship Anchorage, eastern dis-tributary channel, 1871–1878	7 mi (11 km)
Robinson's Landing, Baja California 1854–1878	10 mi (16 km)
Hardy River	23 mi (37 km)
Heintzelman's Point; Head of Tidewater	47 mi (76 km)
Port Famine, Sonora 1854–1878	50 mi (80 km)
Lerdo Landing, Sonora 1872–1896	53 mi (85 km)
Gridiron, Sonora 1854–1878	67 mi (108 km)
Ogden's Landing, Sonora 1854–1878	95 mi (153 km)
Hualapai Smith's, Sonora 1866–1878	105 mi (169 km)
Pedrick's, Arizona Territory 1854–1878	119 mi (192 km)
Jaeger City, California 1858–1862; Colorado City, Arizona Territory 1854–1862	149 mi (240 km)
Fort Yuma, California 1850–1883; Arizona City, Arizona Territory 1858–1873; Yuma, Arizona Territory from 1873	150 mi (240 km)

==== Colorado Delta to Fort Yuma route ====
The route of the steamboats began in the Colorado River Delta, where there was at first just an anchorage near Robinson's Landing in Baja California, 10 miles (16 km) above the river mouth and 40 miles (64 km) below Fort Yuma. Here they picked up their cargoes from ships in the river, to avoid paying Mexican customs duties for landing their cargo. The extreme tides and its tidal bore in the estuary above the river mouth made this loading operation difficult and sometimes dangerous for the vessels engaging in it. Some 20 miles (32 km) above that anchorage the first steamboats were assembled until the later 1860s. There, the tidal conditions were not so violent but the tide could aid in launching the craft.

From 1854, between the delta anchorage and Fort Yuma were the wood-yard steamboat landings of Port Famine 40 miles (64 km) above Robinson's Landing, Gridiron, 17 miles (27 km) above Port Famine, Ogden's Landing 28 miles (45 km) above Gridiron, Pedrick's 24 miles (39 km) above Ogden's Landing, and Fort Yuma 31 miles (50 km) above Pedrick's. With reliable transportation to the fort, new settlements developed in the vicinity of the fort. Colorado City and Jaeger City a mile below Fort Yuma at Jaeger's Ferry. In 1858, 1 mile (1.6 km) above Colorado City, across the river from Fort Yuma, Arizona City was founded, (renamed Yuma in 1873).

In 1865, a better location for an anchorage, and a port and shipyard was established at Port Isabel, Sonora, 157 miles (253 km) below Fort Yuma and 7 miles (11 km) east of the river mouth on the eastern outlet of the river. In 1873, Lerdo Landing appeared on the river, 3 miles (4.8 km) above Port Famine, to connect the pioneering agricultural settlement of Colonia Lerdo to the steamboat traffic on the river. Port Isabel remained in use until 1879, when the railroad came to Yuma, Arizona making it the head of navigation and made Port Isabel and the woodlot landings below Yuma obsolete.

==== Extending The Steamboat Route above Fort Yuma ====
From 1853, ranches were developed nearby up river to supply the fort with beef and barley. That same year gold was found up river. By 1854, copper mines were developed along the river 40 miles (64 km) above Fort Yuma. The ore provided George A. Johnson & Co. with their first commercial cargo to take to the estuary anchorage. Old Mexican mines where reopened in the interior of the Gadsden Purchase that increased the traffic bringing in machinery and shipping out ore. By 1855, the volume of cargo necessitated putting another boat on the river. By December 1855, Johnson had John G. North build and bring in sections a new steamboat from San Francisco to the Delta estuary. There North assembled and launched the 120 foot (37 m) long, 80 hp, wood hulled Colorado. It was capable of carrying 70 tons of cargo while drawing only 2 feet of water and was the first stern-wheeler on the river.

Lower Colorado River Distances Fort Yuma to Virgin River
Location	Distance
Potholes, California, From 1859	18 mi (29 km)
La Laguna, Arizona Territory, 1860–1863	20 mi (32 km)
Castle Dome Landing, Arizona Territory, 1863–1884	35 mi (56 km)
Eureka, Arizona Territory, 1863–1870s	45 mi (72 km)
Williamsport, Arizona Territory, 1863–1870s	47 mi (76 km)
Picacho, California, 1862–1910	48 mi (77 km)
Nortons Landing, Arizona Territory, 1882–1894	52 mi (84 km)
Clip, Arizona Territory, 1882–1888	70 mi (110 km)
California Camp, California	72 mi (116 km)
Camp Gaston, California, 1859–1867	80 mi (130 km)
Drift Desert, Arizona Territory	102 mi (164 km)
Bradshaw's Ferry, California, 1862–1884	126 mi (203 km)
Mineral City, Arizona Territory, 1864–1866	126 mi (203 km)
Ehrenberg, Arizona Territory, from 1866	126.5 mi (203.6 km)
Olive City, Arizona Territory, 1862–1866	127 mi (204 km)
La Paz, Arizona Territory, 1862–1870	131 mi (211 km)
Parker's Landing, Arizona Territory, 1864–1905; Camp Colorado, Arizona, 1864–1869	200 mi (320 km)
Parker, Arizona Territory, from 1908	203 mi (327 km)
Empire Flat, Arizona Territory, 1866–1905	210 mi (340 km)
Bill Williams River, Arizona	220 mi (350 km)
Aubrey City, Arizona Territory, 1862–1888	220 mi (350 km)
Chimehuevis Landing, California	240 mi (390 km)
Liverpool Landing, Arizona Territory	242 mi (389 km)
Grand Turn, Arizona/California	257 mi (414 km)
The Needles, Mohave Mountains, Arizona	263 mi (423 km)
Mellen, Arizona Territory 1890–1909	267 mi (430 km)
Eastbridge, Arizona Territory 1883–1890	279 mi (449 km)
Needles, California, from 1883	282 mi (454 km)
Iretaba City, Arizona Territory, 1864	298 mi (480 km)
Fort Mohave, Arizona Territory, 1859–1890; Beale's Crossing 1858–	300 mi (480 km)
Mohave City, Arizona Territory, 1864–1869	305 mi (491 km)
Hardyville, Arizona Territory, 1864–1893; Low Water Head of Navigation 1864–1881	310 mi (500 km)
Camp Alexander, Arizona Territory, 1867	312 mi (502 km)
Polhamus Landing, Arizona Territory; Low Water Head of Navigation 1881–1882	315 mi (507 km)
Pyramid Canyon, Arizona/Nevada	316 mi (509 km)
Cottonwood Island, Nevada; Cottonwood Valley	339 mi (546 km)
Quartette, Nevada, 1900–1906	342 mi (550 km)
Murphyville, Arizona Territory, 1891	353 mi (568 km)
Eldorado Canyon, Nevada, 1857–1905; Colorado City, Nevada 1861–1905	365 mi (587 km)
Explorer's Rock, Black Canyon of the Colorado, Mouth, Arizona/Nevada	369 mi (594 km)
Roaring Rapids, Black Canyon of the Colorado, Arizona/Nevada	375 mi (604 km)
Ringbolt Rapids, Black Canyon of the Colorado, Arizona/Nevada	387 mi (623 km)
Fortification Rock, Nevada; High Water Head of Navigation, 1858–1866	400 mi (640 km)
Las Vegas Wash, Nevada	402 mi (647 km)
Callville, Nevada, 1864–1869; High Water Head of Navigation 1866–1878	408 mi (657 km)
Boulder Canyon, Mouth, Arizona/Nevada	409 mi (658 km)
Stone's Ferry, Nevada 1866–1876	438 mi (705 km)
Virgin River, Nevada	440 mi (710 km)
Bonelli's Ferry, 1876–1935; Rioville, Nevada 1869–1906; High Water Head of Navigation from 1879 to 1887	440 mi (710 km)

Once the backlog of cargo was relieved by the Colorado, Johnson looked for ways to keep his boats from being idle. He knew that Brigham Young wanted to establish a route to the Mormon settlements in Utah from the sea up the Colorado River and that merchant interests had been interested in establishing trade with the Mormons by the river route since 1852 when the Uncle Sam came to the river. Additionally there was the claim that the river was navigable by steamboat as far as the Virgin River by the fur trapper Antoine Leroux who had successfully rafted down the Colorado from the Virgin River in 1837. In 1856, George A. Johnson was instrumental in getting the support for Congressional funding a military expedition up the river. With those funds Johnson expected to provide the transportation for the expedition but was angry and disappointed when the commander of the expedition Lt. Joseph Christmas Ives rejected his offer of one of his steamboats claiming its cost was too high. Ives, a topographic engineer, used the money to build his own steamboat, the small, iron hulled, sternwheeler Explorer in Philadelphia, test it, disassemble and ship it to the Colorado estuary. There at Robinson's Landing, Ives spent a month assembling his steamboat, launching it on December 30, 1857. Johnson had lent Ives one of his men David C. Robinson as a pilot for the expedition, which set off for Fort Yuma the next day.

Meanwhile, Johnson had decided to conduct his own expedition up river at his own expense with the General Jesup. The War Department concerned about deteriorating relations with the Mormons in Utah wanted to investigate the possibility of bringing troops into Utah by steamboat up the Colorado River. Fort Yuma's commander provided rations, a mountain howitzer and a detachment of 15 soldiers. With the soldiers and 15 armed civilians Johnson had also set off from the fort on December 31. The large crew aided in gathering wood for fuel along the way, and twenty one days later, Johnson's party had reached the first rapids in Pyramid Canyon, over 300 miles (480 km) above Fort Yuma and 8 miles (13 km) above the modern site of Davis Dam. Running low on food he turned back after viewing the river ahead continuing another 40 miles (64 km) and believed he had proved the river could be navigated as far as the Virgin River which he believed to be only 75 miles (121 km) away.

Ives was disappointed to find Johnson had gone ahead of him when his boat reached Fort Yuma and he followed after him. However the unusually designed Explorer was not suited to navigating the sandbar filled Colorado in its low water phase and was continually running aground, much to the delight of the Yuma who came down to the river to watch them run aground on the next sandbar and mock the crew and their boat. Robinson eventually came to use their appearance as a warning of shoals ahead and made better progress, but they made slow progress ascending the river gathering wood along the way. On January 30, Ives and Robinson met Johnson returning and he shared information about the conditions on the river above them. Robinson piloted the Explorer above the point reached by Johnson into the Black Canyon of the Colorado, where they struck a rock that damaged the boat, 40 miles (64 km) above where Johnson reached. Ives named that rock Explorer's Rock.

While the Explorer was being repaired by his engineer, Ives, Robinson and the boat's mate, took their skiff over the next two days farther up the river exploring up through the Black Canyon and beyond to the vicinity of Fortification Rock. Next day, they went 1 mile (1.6 km) farther to Las Vegas Wash, which Ives thought might be the Virgin River, but had doubts because it seemed too small. The difficulties of the rapids above Fortification Rock convinced Ives that the river at Fortification Rock was the practical head of navigation 550 miles (890 km) above the mouth of the river:

"I now determined not to try to ascend the Colorado any further. The water above the Black canon had been shoal, and the current swift. Rapids had occurred in such quick succession as to make navigation almost impossible, and there would be no object in proceeding beyond the Great Bend. The difficulties encountered in the canon were of a character to prevent a steamboat from attempting to traverse it at low water, and we had seen drift-wood lodged in clefts fifty feet above the river, betokening a condition of things during the summer freshet that would render navigation more hazardous at that season than now. It appeared, therefore, that the foot of the Black canon should be considered the practical head of navigation, and I concluded to have a reconnaissance made to connect that point with the Mormon road, and to let this finish the exploration of the navigable portion of the Colorado."

Ives' party returned easily in 6–7 hours, believing that a steamboat of shallower draft than Explorer, in higher water, could reach the area of Fortification Rock. Following its return to Fort Yuma, Johnson bought the Explorer, took out its engine and used it as a barge to carry wood between the wood-yards on the Colorado River below Fort Yuma until it was swept away down river and lost in the Delta in 1864.

==== Mohave War and the first gold rush on the Colorado ====
Despite the successful exploration up the river, the lands along the upper river did not begin to be settled until after the 1858–1859 Mohave War and the establishment of Fort Mohave. The General Jesup and the newer stern-wheeler Colorado where engaged to carry troops and supplies up river for the Mohave Expeditions at $500 per day, and thereafter contracted to support the army posts of Camp Gaston and Camp Mohave, later Fort Mohave. Support of Fort Mohave became the first economic incentive for the steamboats up river. This was soon followed by the support of settlements created by the rush to various gold and silver mining locations near the river in the next decades.

With the discovery of the Gila Placers by Jacob Snively came the first Arizona gold rush in 1858–1859, which created the ephemeral Gila City just east of Fort Yuma on the Gila River. It also inspired the creation of the first opposition steamboat company to Johnson's company, the Gila Mining and Transportation Company. In March 1859, it sent a disassembled 125-foot-long by 25-foot beam stern-wheel steamboat, and a cargo including a steam engine, to supply the Gila mine with water to Robinson's Landing, in the schooner Arno. However the whole cargo and the rival boat was lost there before it was ever unloaded. The tidal bore tore loose Arno's anchors, driving the ship on a sandbar holing it, sinking it in a half hour with the ship and cargo a total loss. Without the steam engine providing water for washing out the gold at the mine, a mile from the Gila River, American miners could not work it profitably and the town soon was mostly abandoned. Only Sonora miners familiar with dry wash techniques stayed and made it pay.

Also early in 1859, placer gold was found 18 miles (29 km) above Fort Yuma at the Pot Holes on the west bank of the Colorado River in California. These diggings had been previously worked by Spanish miners from Mission San Pedro y San Pablo de Bicuñer in 1781. In August 1859 Johnson retired the General Jesup and replaced it with the 140-foot Cocopah, assembled and launched at Gridiron, in Sonora and captained by David C. Robinson. Its shallow 19-inch draft and stern-wheel was better suited to transit the upper Colorado route, and was the model for all the steamboats on the river thereafter.

From 1859, prospectors dispersed up the Colorado River valley in the next few years, finding gold deposits along the river as far as the Black Canyon. In 1860, gold was found across the Colorado River from Potholes in Arizona, in placers at La Laguna. The strikes that followed in the next four years would make George A. Johnson and his two partners wealthy.

=== Civil War, Colorado River Mining Boom and Opposition Lines ===
==== Civil War and the Colorado River ====
By March 1861, the secession crisis had led to the closing of the Butterfield Overland Mail. February 19, 1861, the Bascom Affair led to the first of the wars with the Apache, cutting Arizona off from the rest of New Mexico Territory to the east and reduced mining activity in southern Arizona to next to nothing. Federal troops were withdrawn from Fort Mohave, to secure Southern California for the Union. Others at Fort Buchanan were withdrawn to the Rio Grande to confront the Confederate advance toward Santa Fe. What little commerce came into Arizona came from Sonora or from the river port at Arizona City. When Federal troops were withdrawn and desperate for protection from the Apache, the southern half of New Mexico Territory declared for the Confederacy late in 1861.

In response to the establishment of Confederate Arizona, California Volunteers of the Union Army took control of the Yuma ferries, built up the garrison and provisions at Fort Yuma and strengthened its fortifications, all with supplies brought from San Francisco with the aid of Johnson's steamboats. The California Column launched its campaign to cut off the Confederate Army of the New Mexico Campaign and retake Confederate Arizona in 1862, and based its subsequent occupation of New Mexico Territory on its depot in Arizona City, again provisioned by Johnson's steamboats. When Fort Mohave was reoccupied by California Volunteers in 1864 it was supplied as before by Johnson's steamboats. These Federal contracts were the base of Johnson's revenue but it was soon greatly supplemented by a mining boom.

==== Colorado River Mining Boom ====
===== El Dorado Canyon Rush =====
Prospecting and mining in the El Dorado Canyon, in what was then western New Mexico Territory (present day Nevada), had been going on from at least 1857 if not earlier. But in April 1861, as the American Civil War began, word got out that silver and some gold lodes had been discovered by John Moss and others in El Dorado Canyon. The canyon was on the west side of the river 65 miles (105 km) above Fort Mohave near what was then considered the high water limit of navigation. George A. Johnson came up river and made a deal to supply the mines with his steamboats at $100 a ton, a lower price than the $240 a ton charged for overland freight across the Mojave Desert from Los Angeles.

That fall news of the strikes brought a flood of miners to the canyon. Several camps were founded in the canyon. San Juan, or Upper Camp were at the top of the canyon, near modern Nelson, Nevada. Midway down the canyon near the Techatticup Mine were Alturas and Louisville. At the mouth of the canyon was the landing Colorado City. Later during the American Civil War, in 1862, Lucky Jim Camp was formed along Eldorado Canyon above January Wash, south of the Techatticup Mine. Lucky Jim Camp was the home of miners sympathetic to the Confederate cause. A mile up the canyon was a camp with Union sympathies called Buster Falls.

For the first two years only high grade ore worth over $200 a ton could be mined profitably in the Canyon, because it had to be shipped out to San Francisco for milling. Johnson's steamboats could only reach the Eldorado Canyon landing between May and October and carry enough cargo to make it pay. At high water, in May and June, the steamboat took several days to ascend against the strong current the 65 miles (105 km) from Fort Mohave, but could return in as little as 4 hours under full steam. From November to April ore had to be freighted overland at great expense to ships at San Pedro or wait at the landing for the high water of May and the steamboat.

By June 1862, the Colorado Mining District had been organized by El Dorado Canyon miners, covering the area west of the river through the mountains and for a distance along its length to the north and south of the canyon. In late 1863, a stamp mill begun by Col. James Russell Vineyard of Los Angeles was completed in the canyon, at what became El Dorado City, to process the ore of its mines and cut out the cost of shipping the ore, cutting costs in half. Johnson losing his downstream ore trade and making fewer trips up to the Canyon responded by raising his freight rates.

===== Colorado River Gold Rush =====
In January 1862, Pauline Weaver discovered gold in an arroyo while trapping along the Arizona side of the Colorado River 130 miles (210 km) above Fort Yuma. After he brought a crew of Sonorans from Gila City to dry wash the site with good results, the rush to what became the La Paz Mining District began, with new strikes being found within 20 miles (32 km) to the east and south of the original strike near what came to be the town of La Paz. La Paz was located next to the Laguna de La Paz on a branch of the Colorado in the Spring of 1862. Following the high water later that year the river changed course to the west isolating the Laguna de La Paz landing from steamboat traffic. A new landing developed 4 miles (6.4 km) southwest of La Paz at Olivia, later Olive City in early 1863 and miners there formed the Weaver Mining District extending south of the town along the river and separate from the La Paz District. During 1862, miners from Sonora also found gold in the Cargo Muchacho Mountains northwest of Fort Yuma.

Prospecting parties spread out looking for more strikes. From Eldorado Canyon they established the Pyramid Mining District east of the river in the Black Mountains. John Moss and others in the vicinity of Fort Mohave established the San Francisco Mining District northeast of the fort in the Black Mountains. The Sacramento Mining District 37 miles (60 km) from Fort Mohave were established by soldiers in September 1863, to the east beyond the Black Mountains in the southern end of the Cerbat Mountains. A party led by John Moss founded the Waubau Yuma Mining District in the Hualapai Mountains 50 miles (80 km) east of Fort Mohave. West of the fort in the Providence Mountains of California, silver was found and the Rock Springs Mining District was established in April 1863 and the Macedonia Mining District in September 1864. Soldiers from Fort Mohave established the Irataba Mining District in early 1863 when they found copper 5 miles (8.0 km) west of the river in the Dead Mountains of California. First the landing at Mohave City was founded near Fort Mohave. Then Irataba City, followed in January 1864 but it was supplanted when the ferry and landing of Hardyville was established in March 1864, to serve these mines, supported by Johnson's steamboat company.

North of La Paz a copper strike 12 miles (19 km) east of the river led to organization of the Williams Fork Mining District with its landing at Aubrey City. Copper was also found west of Aubrey City and the river in California, in the Freeman Mining District, and southeast of Aubrey City in the Harcuvar Mining District named for the Harcuvar Mountains 35 miles (56 km) east of the river and 55 miles (89 km) northeast of La Paz. New placers were found in the fall of 1862, 50 miles (80 km) south of La Paz on the California side of the river in the Picacho Mining District with Picacho Landing serving it 48 miles (77 km) up river from Fort Yuma. Across the river in Arizona gold was found in the Castle Dome Mountains to the north of it silver-lead ore was found which created the Castle Dome Mining District in spring of 1863. Castle Dome Landing was established to serve this district. In 1864, silver and gold were found in the Eureka Mining District 40 miles (64 km) north of Fort Yuma across the river from the Picacho District in the Chocolate Mountains. It was served by the Williamsport landing 47 miles (76 km) up river from Fort Yuma.

In the fall of 1863 another landing developed at Mineral City, 1 mile downstream from Olive City where the recently created freight wagon road across the desert from San Bernardino, the Bradshaw Trail, crossed the river at Bradshaw's Ferry. Fort Whipple was established and gold mines, mining camps and the towns of Prescott and Wickenburg were opened to the east in central Arizona at the mining districts of Agua Frio, Big Bug, Bradshaw, Hassyampa, Turkey Creek, Walnut Grove, Weaver, Wikenburg and Yavapai. These were also all primarily supplied by the La Paz - Wikenburg Road and Hardyville - Prescott Road from those landings on the Colorado River. However, by late 1863 these supplies were piling up on ships at anchor in the Delta or on the dock in Arizona City, not getting through in sufficient volume to prevent shortages and cause prices up river and in the interior to skyrocket. Ore from the mines to be shipped out to be processed was piling up on the shores of the landings along the river.

==== Rise of Opposition Lines 1863 ====
The Colorado River Gold Rush had made George A. Johnson and his partners rich. Johnson and Wilcox married into Californio ranchero families. Johnson acquired Rancho Peñasquitos, went into politics and was elected to the California legislature for San Diego in 1862. Wilcox became a banker in San Diego and lived at Rancho Melijo. Hartshorne who was president of the company operating the business from San Francisco, invested his new wealth in the California Steam Navigation Company, and became its president in 1865. Management of the steamboat fleet at the river was delegated to Issac Polhamus its senior captain. However the Colorado River business based on government contracts for the military was now being overwhelmed by the trade from the mines and settlements dependent on the river. Worse, the Johnson Company had failed to increase its carrying capacity on the river. Despite rebuilding the worn Colorado I into the larger Colorado II in 1862, Johnson still only had two steamboats on the river as they had from 1859.

The Cocopah made round trips up river from Arizona City to the La Paz landings during the high water mouths of May and June at its full capacity of sixty tons of freight in four days, amounting to four hundred tons a month. However, as the river level subsequently declined the trips became slower and could carry less cargo. By December Cocopah could only manage eighty tons a month, barely able to make only two trips with forty tons in that time. Trips farther up river to the vicinity of Fort Mohave took at least twice as long. The same difficulty plagued the Colorado carrying cargo between the estuary and Arizona City. By the fall of 1863 there was a backlog of twelve hundred tons of freight at Arizona City or in ships anchored in the estuary waiting to be brought up river. Between ten and fifty tons of ore waiting to be brought down to the estuary at each of the landings up river above Arizona City. Some of this cargo had been waiting for couple of months and most would have to wait until May and the rise of the Colorado. A letter to the editor of the Arizona Miner, April 26, 1864 blames the backlog on the newly arrived merchants who, unaware of the necessity of getting their goods to the river during the July, August, September, and October, high water period, when large volumes of cargo can be quickly delivered, had "...delayed until the river had gone down and were then crowded in more rapidly than the steamers could possibly carry up in any reasonable time."

From the beginning Johnson & Company rates were considered excessive compared to those on other Western rivers. Additionally merchants at La Paz 280 miles (450 km) up river objected to the $75 per ton charged by Johnson & Company, while Williamsport 80 miles (130 km) down river paid only $25 per ton. Now in the summer and fall of 1863 as merchants upriver rapidly ran out of goods and prices rose astronomically. Steamboat captains and their officers took advantage of the situation by purchasing needed goods on their own account then carried them up river to sell for a quick profit at the now inflated prices, leaving behind identical shipments consigned to the merchants. However even these shipments ended in November when an extreme fall in the river left the Cocopah stranded on a sandbar 30 miles (48 km) above La Paz.

Merchants and miners held a protest meeting at La Paz on December 1, 1863. It condemned Johnson & Company as a monopoly, that was trying to drive the miners out in order to gain control of the mines. The meeting voted to send a representative to San Francisco with a petition calling for the establishment of an opposition steamboat line on the Colorado River. In San Francisco, their representative Samuel "Steamboat" Adams convinced the Chamber of Commerce to endorse a rival line. Merchants of the city raised $25,000 by subscription, and Adams persuaded Captain Thomas Trueworthy, to send the steamboat Esmerelda under Captain Charles C. Overman and the Victoria, a four-masted schooner converted from a barge, to the Colorado River to establish the Union Line there. The Victoria was to be a store ship at the mouth of the river, but she was soon broken up by the tidal bore soon after it reached the mouth of the Colorado in March.

After Overman arrived at the river mouth he built the Black Crook, first tow barge to be used on the Colorado River. Of a type commonly used on the San Francisco Bay and Sacramento River and its tributaries, the barge was 128 x 28 feet capable of carrying 100 tons of freight. These barges were towed on a 100 foot cable secured to a short mast atop the steamboat amid-ship to avoid fouling with the stern-wheel. Each barge had a helmsman that steered the barge in the wake of the boat towing it. In early May, Trueworthy took the Esmerelda up river for the first time with the Black Crook in tow making it to Fort Yuma in three days, eight hours.

With Johnson & Company raising freight rates to and from his mines in El Dorado Canyon and the Freeman District in late 1863, and with the belief that there were freighting profits to be made competing with it, Alphonso F. Tilden, of the Philadelphia Silver and Copper Mining Company, put a second Opposition steamboat on the river, the Nina Tilden. Built in San Francisco by Martin Vice and launched in July 1864, it was able to do 16 knots while it carried 120 tons and would tow a 100 ton barge. A veteran captain of the Sacramento and Fraser Rivers, George B. Gorman, steamed the Nina Tilden down the coast to the Colorado River. In September, Gorman also began to compete with the Johnson & Company and the Union Line, towing the barge White Fawn, knocked down and shipped in a schooner to the estuary where it was reassembled.

=== Competition, Consolidation and Monopoly ===
==== Competition 1864–1866 ====
Once Johnson realized the seriousness of the situation he ordered a new steamboat, Mohave that would be ready in May 1864. In the meanwhile he got control of as much of the cargo being held up in the estuary as he could by means of using his boats shipping it a short way up river from the estuary to the landing at Gridiron, whereby he obtained a lien on the cargo so his competitors could not take it. This left his competitors with less idled freight to carry and needing agents from San Francisco to ship new freight through them, instead of to Johnson & Company. Johnson also bought out most of the wood at the woodyard landings along the river so his opposition would be slowed by the necessity to have to gather up their own firewood or establish their own system of wood-yards. The Johnson Company also cut shipping charges to La Paz landing to $40 a ton, in an attempt to pacify the merchants there.

Additionally, "Steamboat" Adams accused Johnson & Company of sending men to attack Esmeralda by damaging her machinery, setting fires, cutting her moorings and attempting to wreck her with floating logs. Her owner Trueworthy, complained Johnson's pressure on insurance brokers in San Francisco prevented him from getting insurance on his boat and cargo.

Soon after the Esmeralda and its barge began running on the river, the Mohave was launched in May giving Johnson 3 boats to carry goods, just as the flood waters came making rapid and heavily laden trips possible. By September, the Nina Tilden, was also carrying goods up river, making 5 boats and 2 barges that soon ended the backlog of freight, producing its opposite condition, boats sitting idle by the fall of 1864. Cushioned by their government contracts Johnson & Company was not as vulnerable, but Tilden and Trueworthy needed more commercial revenue to make a go of it.

The only new business to be had by the opposition was to service the settlements of Utah Territory, up river at a landing called Callville cutting costs of transportation by $100 a ton, one third of the cost of the overland route from Los Angeles called the Los Angeles - Salt Lake Road. Trueworthy proposed to do this at all times of the year, and tried to take the Esmerelda there in early 1865, towing a barge loaded with merchandise and timber, but turned back at the Roaring Rapids in Black Canyon, when word came that his buyers had left Callville. Johnson associate William Harrison Hardy had succeeded in getting there first, leaving January 2, poling and sailing (when the wind was favorable) a 50 by 8 foot flat boat "Arizona" 90 miles (140 km) from Hardyville to Callville in 12 days. Trueworthy had to tie up his boat at Eldorado Canyon and ride to Salt Lake City to sell his cargo.

==== Consolidation 1866–1867 ====
In the summer of 1865, Esmerelda of the Union Line, was consolidated with the other rival boat Tilden's Nina Tilden, into the Pacific and Colorado Steam Navigation Company, also headed by Thomas E. Trueworthy, with backing from San Francisco financiers. Trueworthy tried again to reach Callville during the high water in the summer of 1866. Esmeralda with a barge and ninety tons of freight, under Trueworthy's former first mate Captain Robert T. Rogers. The Esmeralda reached the landing at Callville on October 8, 1866, after three months. She was slowed by lack of firewood and (at what became known as the Ringbolt Rapids), with insufficient power to ascend the rapids, a ring bolt had had to be set in the canyon wall and the boat pulled through with a line run to her capstan. Despite her triumph at reaching the new "head of navigation" at Callvile, Esmerelda upon her return to Arizona City, was seized by the Sheriff of Yuma County, for debts owned by Thomas E. Trueworthy's company. She passed through the hands of Arizona Navigation Company, another company the creditors tried to form hoping to salvage the opposition steamboat business. This failing, Esmerelda and Nina Tilden were sold in the fall of 1867, to George A. Johnson & Company. Esmerelda was dismantled in 1868. The Nina Tilden continued in use on the river, until she was retired to Port Isabel in 1873.

==== Colorado Steam Navigation Company 1867—1877 ====
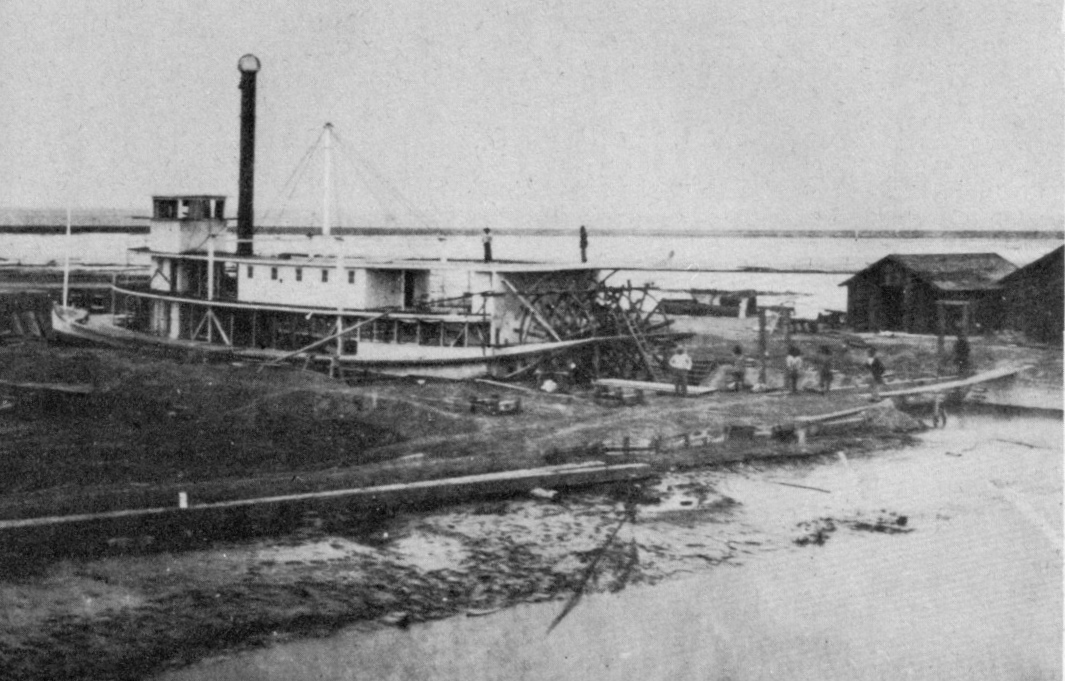
Colorado II in a tidal dry dock in the shipyard above Port Isabel, Sonora. Colorado, the second stern-wheel steamboat of that name running on the Colorado River for the George A. Johnson & Company and Colorado Steam Navigation Company between 1862 and 1878.

After the rival boats were sidelined Johnson & Company had no further competition. Port Isabel Slough was found by Captain W. H. Pierson of the schooner Isabel in 1865. This slough was an anchorage, sheltered from the tidal bore, permitting safe transfer of cargoes and a few miles farther up was another slough ideal for a shipyard. Here Port Isabel was established by 1867. The competition had caused rates to fall and service improved due to the addition more boats and the use of barges. Lower costs helped development of the territory, that in turn stimulated further trade and greater profits to the steamboat company in the following years. Given the firm grip Johnson & Company had on federal contracts on the river only the Utah trade could support a new competitor. All chance of that ended as the Central Pacific and Union Pacific railroads met in Utah in 1869, ending the profitability of overland trade from Los Angeles to Salt Lake City or by water from San Francisco via the Colorado.

In 1869, the George A. Johnson & Company was reorganized with an infusion of more capital and with additional partners, as the Colorado Steam Navigation Company. With this new capital they started their own steamship line with the side-wheel steamship, SS Newbern under Captain A. N. McDonough. From July 2, 1871, Newbern ran the 2,100 miles (3,400 km) voyage monthly to Port Isabel in twelve days, cutting in half the time taken by sailing ships speeding up freight and passenger service. Newbern was so successful that they added the former Pacific Mail side-wheel steamship SS Montana, under Capt. Captain William Metzger, in 1874. With the pair of ships, the voyage was made every 20 days. However later that year, Montana ran aground and had to be towed back to San Francisco for 3 months of repairs. Back in service, she caught fire near Guaymas, on December 14, 1876, and was a total loss. She was replaced in January 1877 with SS Montana's sister ship the SS Idaho under Captain George M. Douglass. The companies steamships brought in more earnings than those of all their steamboats on the river.

=== Railroads and the decline of the Steamboats ===
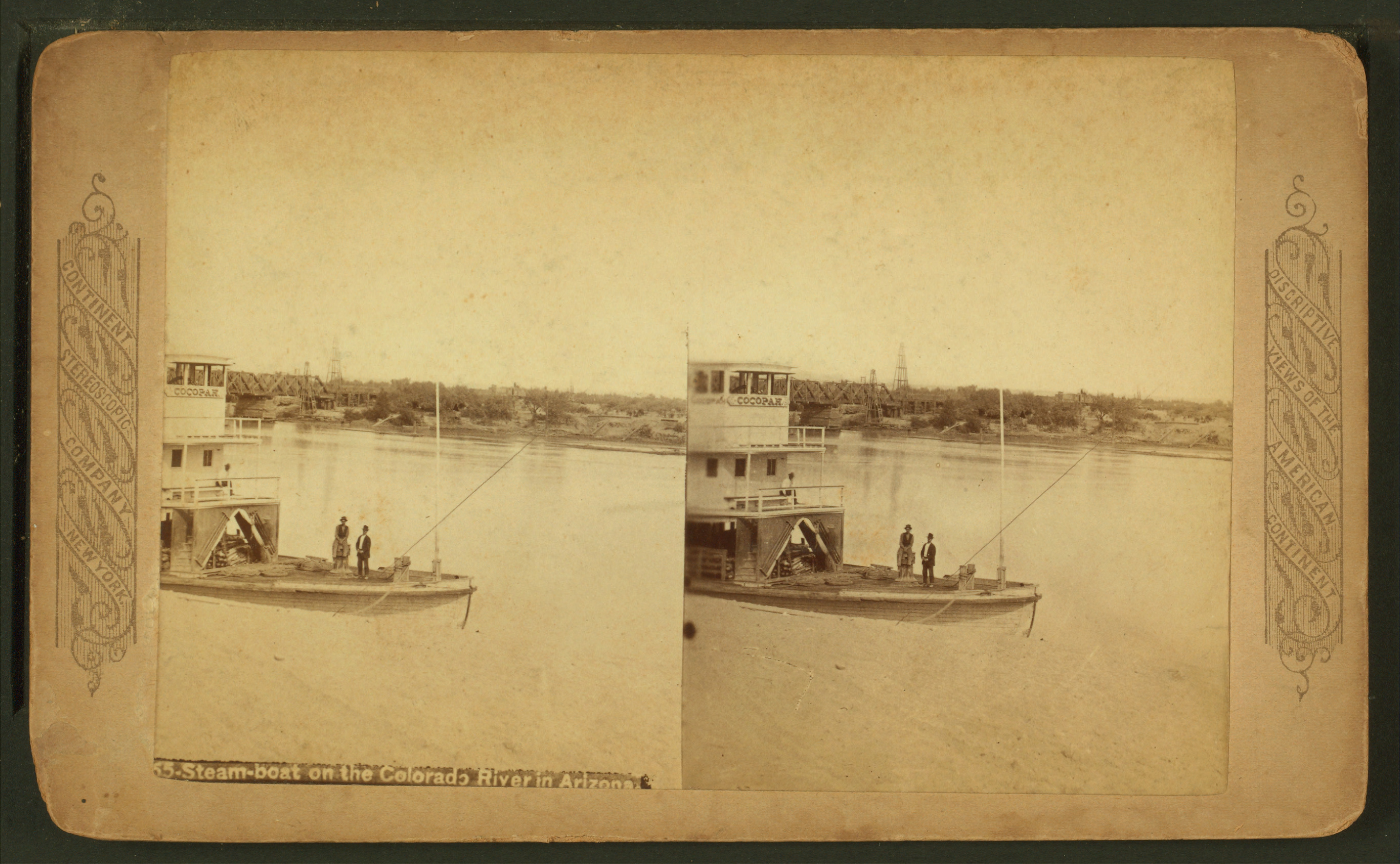
Cocopah II at Yuma, Arizona. A stereoscopic picture of the Cocopah, the second stern-wheel steamboat of that name running on the Colorado River for the Colorado Steam Navigation Company between 1867 and 1879. This photo was taken between 1877 and 1879, because the Southern Pacific railroad bridge built across the Colorado River in 1877 can be seen in the background. The railroad took away the freight business making the Cocopah obsolete and it was retired in 1879 and dismantled in 1881.

The fate of the Colorado Steam Navigation Company would be determined by the Southern Pacific Company founded in San Francisco, in 1865 by a group of businessmen led by Timothy Phelps with the aim of building a rail connection between San Francisco and San Diego. The company was purchased in September 1868 by the Big Four: Crocker, Hopkins, Huntington and Stanford, that had created the Central Pacific Railroad and that merged it into the Southern Pacific Company in 1870.

The Southern Pacific Company began building track southward through the San Joaquin Valley and reached Bakersfield, California on November 8, 1874. It then began the construction of the Tehachapi Loop over the Tehachapi Pass and across the Mohave Desert into Southern California. By September 5, 1876 their first train from San Francisco had reached Los Angeles. In May 1877, the Southern Pacific tracks from Los Angeles reached the Colorado River at Yuma, Arizona. On May 21, 1877, Johnson and his partners sold their company to the Western Development Company, a holding company for the partners who owned the Southern Pacific railroad. The California Steam Navigation Company was held by the holding company as a subsidiary under its own name. The most profitable part of the business, and the steamship Newbern was retained by the partners Hartshorne and Wilcox who formed the California and Mexican Steamship Line running from San Francisco to Mexican cities on the west coast. John Bermingham another former partner of the CSNC, was its president.

==== Western Development Company 1877—1886 ====
With the sale of the company Yuma became the home port of the river steamers. Ships no longer called at Port Isabel, and in 1878 it was abandoned, the shipyard moved up to Yuma. From 1879, steamboat trade up river was cut as most of the freight once shipped from Yuma to Ehrenburg and Hardyville for shipment to the interior of Arizona Territory, was offloaded instead at places like Gila Bend and Maricopaville and shipped north to settlements and mines in Central and Northern Arizona, and at a lower cost. Ehrenburg, once the gateway to the interior of Arizona, was reduced to a minor settlement with only a wood-yard for the passing steamboats. The silver mines and mills in Eldorado Canyon were booming, and to serve it better, ring bolts were installed in Boulder Canyon in 1879 to allow steamboats to pass beyond Callville up to the mouth of the Virgin River at Rioville. They picked up salt from mines near Rioville to be delivered to the reduction furnaces downriver for the next eight years. For a short time, the mining company also used a shallow draft sloop, the Sou'Wester, to bring salt downriver in the low water season. In the Trigo Mountains to the south, the new Silver Mining District and the towns of Clip and Nortons Landing opened up in the early 1880s, but they had their own mills so they and the Picacho District mines provided little business to the steamboats.

Hardyville still profitably served the nearby mining districts near the upper reaches of the river, still remote from the railroad. However, in 1881, Polhamus with two merchants from Mineral Park established Polhamus Landing 5 miles (8.0 km) above Hardyville, to break Hardy's monopoly of the trade to the mines in the Cerbat Mountains. Hardyville diminished to a mill site and its post office was discontinued in favor of the one in Mohave City on February 19, 1883. But a greater rival was coming to supplant the steamboats.

In January 1880, the Atchison, Topeka and Santa Fe Railroad (AT&SF), which had recently entered New Mexico Territory from the north, acquired control of the western division of the Atlantic and Pacific Railroad that then began a line westward from the AT&SF line at Isleta, New Mexico to meet the Southern Pacific Railroad at what became Needles, California. Construction began that year, and reached Kingman, Arizona, just south of the Cerbat range, in 1882. The SP began building a branch from Mojave, California that same year, east to Needles, where the two met in May, 1883. For 3 months building crews struggled build a wooden bridge across the Colorado River, driving wooden pilings into the river bed only to see them washed out by the river. Pilings were only driven into the mid river section with the help of a pile driver mounted on Barge No. 3, towed and held in position by the Mohave II. It was completed on August 9, 1883. As a result, by September 10, 1886 traffic and profits on the upper river had declined to the point Western Development Company sold Colorado Steam Navigation Company to its two remaining captains Isaac Polhamus and Jack Mellon.

==== Polhamus, Mellon and Their Rivals, 1886–1904 ====
For the next six years Polhamus and Mellon struggled to save their steamboat business. The partners reliable income now came from carrying supplies to Parker and Fort Mohave Indian agencies and coal for stamp mills at Eldorado Canyon and Hardyville. The decline in silver prices through the 1880s and early 1890s that culminated in the repeal of the Sherman Silver Purchase Act in 1893, closed many silver mines along the Colorado River including those at Eldorado Canyon in 1887, and in the Silver Mining District and the towns of Clip and Nortons Landing in 1888. The Hardyville mill became idle and the town was abandoned and became a ghost town. Occasionally the steamboats carried supplies or machinery for ranches and mines at other places along the river, or ran excursion boats from Yuma or Needles. They helped the Atlantic and Pacific Railroad rebuild their bridge across the Colorado below Needles at Eastbridge washed out or undermined by spring floods in 1884, 1886 and 1888 before they moved it, diverting their line down river to a crossing on a solid rock bottom at the station and later settlement of Mellen named, (though misspelled), for Captain Jack Mellon. There in 1889, they helped the railroad put in a cantilever bridge that was finished in 1890 and remained in use for decades. They also attempted to start regular steamboat tours by railroad passengers up to the mouth of the Grand Canyon and down to the Gulf of California but without success.

The salvation of the company came with the revival and discovery of gold mining districts along the Colorado in the 1890s. In January, 1891, gold was found on the north slope of the New York Mountains, in California, about 40 miles (64 km)north of Goffs station, on the Santa Fé Railway. A mining camp, Vanderbilt was established nearby Vanderbilt Spring. The discovery of additional gold-rich veins in the fall of 1892 set off a rush to the area. A few months later gold was found at what became the placer mining camp of Murphyville, on the Arizona side of the river just 12 miles (19 km) below Eldorado Canyon. Also in 1892, another gold boom occurred 20 miles (32 km) east of Eldorado Canyon at White Hills in the White Hills, in Arizona Territory. Gold mines were revived in the Picacho District and Cargo Muchacho District northwest of Yuma. Over the next ten years, more gold was found along the river, the largest strikes were at the Searchlight District mines, discovered in May 1897, 14 miles (23 km) west of the river, south of Eldorado Canyon, and the Goldroad District and Vivian District mines near what later became Oatman, 12 miles (19 km) east of Fort Mohave from 1903. All of these three later districts and at Picacho had railroad lines from the mines to their riverside stamp mills, that were built, fueled and supplied with the aid of the steamboats. Both the Gila and Mohave II were kept busy and a new barge, the Enterprise, had to be built to keep up with the trade.

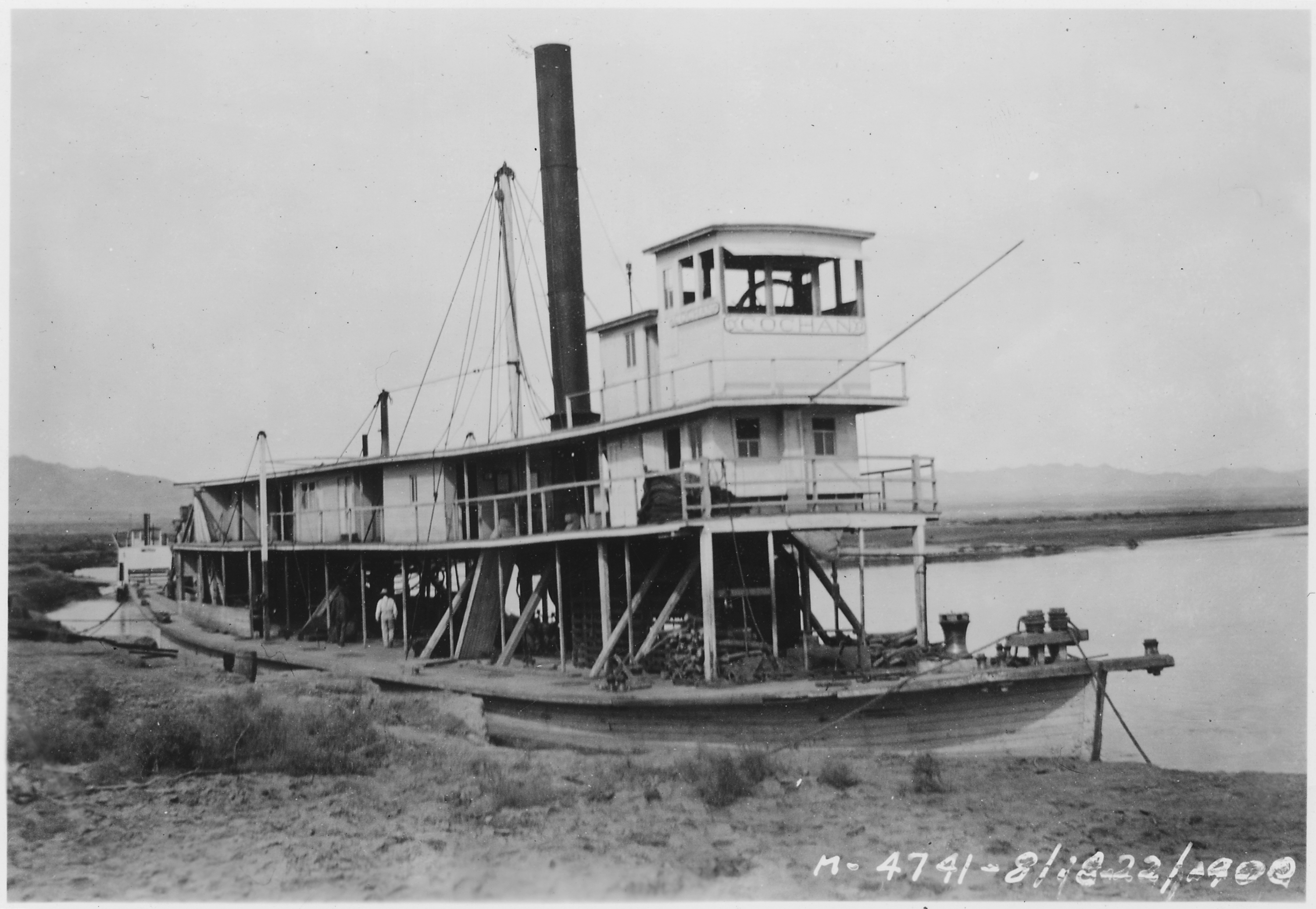
View showing steamboat Cochan on the Colorado River near Yuma, Arizona in 1900. A photograph of the Cochan, last stern-wheel steamboat running on the Colorado River for the Colorado Steam Navigation Company between 1899 and 1909. This photo was taken in 1900. Cochan was sold to the U.S Reclamation Service in 1909. Not required by the Service, Cochan was dismantled in 1910.

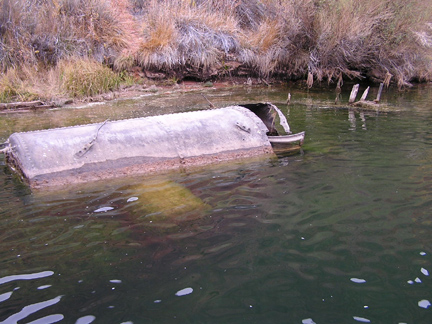
Remnants of the wreck of the stern-wheeler Charles H. Spencer, just below Lee's Ferry where it was abandoned in Spring 1912.

However the boom also attracted competition once again. The Stacy Brothers operated out of Yuma with new gasoline powered boats from 1891 to 1895 when Colorado Steam Navigation bought them out acquiring the Aztec. This gas boat they tried to use on the upper river in the low water season but it was no better than their steamboats and carried less cargo. Some other gas boats were put on the upper river by rivals but with no success. The first real rival was the steamboat St. Valier built by the Santa Ana Mining Company at Needles in 1899, but tied up in litigation it did not operate on the river until 1900. In the face of this competition, Polhamus and Mellon had the engine of the old Gila taken out in put in a new boat, the 135 foot long Cochan. Cochan began work on the river carrying freight for the Searchlight mines in January 1900. At the same time the old Mohave II was run into Jaeger's Slough and left to decay.

St. Valier was purchased by the Mexican-Colorado Navigation Company in December 1901 from the Santa Ana Mining Company's creditors, adding cabins on her upper deck allowing them to compete for passenger business. Under the command of a former barge captain of the Colorado Steam Navigation Company, they made regular trips between Yuma and Needles competing with the rival steamboat Cochan. Another serious rival appeared in 1902 when the Colorado River Transportation Company built the 91 foot long Searchlight (sternwheeler) another stern-wheel steamboat, the last built on the lower Colorado. It was launched at Needles in December 1902, its engines were installed and it was on the river by March 1903. It soon cut into the trade of Colorado Steam Navigation Company to Quartette Landing and Searchlight.

Additionally, between, 1901 and 1905 the San Pedro, Los Angeles and Salt Lake Railroad was built across southern Nevada, through Las Vegas, to Daggett, California where it connected to the AT&SF, and the complete Salt Lake–Los Angeles line was opened on May 1, 1905. In the face of these developments, in 1904, Issac Polhamus, sold out his share of the business to Mellon and two other partners.

==== Last Years Of Steam Navigation On The Lower Colorado, 1905–1916 ====
By 1905 the Los Angeles and Salt Lake Railroad ended the need for steamboats at Quartette Landing and Eldorado Canyon in Nevada, the landings and the mills there were abandoned. The town of Nelson was founded near the head of the canyon nearest the road to the railroad, the post office of Eldorado was closed on August 31, 1907 and moved to Nelson. In 1906, Santa Fé railroad built the Barnwell and Searchlight Railway to the west to tie Searchlight to its subsidiary California Eastern Railway at Barnwell, California.

Also in 1905, the Arizona and California Railroad bridged the Colorado River at Parker, Arizona, cutting in half the last profitable section of the river for the Colorado Steam Navigation Company between Yuma and Needles. By the end of 1905 all the steamboats, Cochan, St. Vallier and Searchlight, were withdrawn down river to Yuma. Their places were taken by smaller gasoline powered boats, until they were in turn replaced by trucks.

The remaining steamboats worked on irrigation projects on the lower part of the river and on repairing the 1904–1907 breach in the Alamo Canal, that directed the Colorado River into the Salton Sink and created the Salton Sea before it was repaired. The last project, the construction of the Laguna Dam ended steam navigation on the river, except for the Searchlight that lingered on as property of the U. S. Reclamation Service until it was sunk in 1916.

=== Steamboats on the Upper Colorado and Green Rivers 1891–1912 ===
Steamboats were tried in Glen Canyon, the Green River in Utah and Wyoming and the Grand River, (after 1921 renamed as the upper part of the Colorado River), above its confluence with the Green River in Utah and in Colorado. Unlike the Lower Colorado, the railroads made possible most of this steam navigation on the Upper Colorado, bringing in the boats or their parts and their fuel to the points on the river where they were assembled and launched.
