= Explorer's Rock =

Former land feature on the Colorado River

- Location within Arizona

Geography
- Coordinates: 35°45′40″N 114°41′50″W
- Interactive map of Explorer's Rock

Explorer's Rock was a large rock in the Colorado River that was a hazard to navigation at the mouth of the Black Canyon of the Colorado between Arizona and Nevada during the 19th century. It got its name from incident where the iron hulled steamboat Explorer struck it doing some damage, during the expedition of Lieutenant Joseph C. Ives, Corps of Topographical Engineers to explore the Colorado River of the West in 1857 and 1858.

Explorer's Rock, was 4 miles above El Dorado Canyon. This location is just east of Squaw Peaks.

== History ==
Explorer's Rock located at the entrance to the Black Canyon of the Colorado was one of the significant hazards to navigation to steamboats, barges, and other shipping when ascending or descending the Colorado River between El Dorado Canyon and Callville or Rioville, in the 19th Century.

It lay above a short rapid below the mouth of the canyon just below the surface in a reach of still water. Ives describes the circumstances of the collision:

"A rapid, a hundred yards below the mouth of the canon, created a short detention, and a strong head of steam was put on to make the ascent. After passing the crest the current became slack, the soundings were unusually favorable, and we were shooting swiftly past the entrance, eagerly gazing into the mysterious depths beyond, when the Explorer, with a stunning crash, brought up abruptly and instantaneously against a sunken rock." "The concussion was so violent that the men near the bow were thrown overboard; the doctor, Mr. Mollhausen, and myself, having been seated in front of the upper deck, were precipitated head foremost into the bottom of the boat; the fireman, who was pitching a log into the fire, went half-way in with it; the boiler was thrown out of place; the steam pipe doubled up; the wheel-house torn away; and it was expected that the boat would fill and sink instantly by all, but Mr. Carroll, who was looking for an explosion from the injured steam pipes. Finding, after a few moments had passed, that she still floated, Captain Robinson had a line taken into the skiff, and the steamer was towed alongside of a gravelly spit a little below; it was then ascertained that the stem of the boat, where the iron flanges of the two bow sections were joined, had struck fair upon the rock, and that, although the flanges were torn away, no hole had been made, and the hull was uninjured. The other damages were such as a day or two of labor could repair."

Ives and his boat captain David C. Robinson examined the hidden rock:

"... the captain and myself went out in the skiff and examined the rock. It stands in the centre of the channel; has steep sides and a conical shape. The summit, which comes almost to a point, is about four inches below the surface of the water; and if the boat had struck half an inch to one side or the other of the flanges, the sheet of iron that forms the bow would have been torn open as though it had been a strip of pasteboard."

A Report of the Chief of Engineers U.S. Army in 1885 suggested the upper portion of the rock be blasted away to clear the hazard to navigation but this was never done.

== The Site Today ==
Explorer's Rock lies in place but under the deeper waters of Lake Mohave.
