= Roaring Rapids (Colorado River) =

Water feature of the river

- Location within Arizona

Geography
- Coordinates: 35°50′35″N 114°42′12″W
- Interactive map of Roaring Rapids

Roaring Rapids are one of several rapids in the Black Canyon of the Colorado, 10.25 miles above El Dorado Canyon in the Colorado River between Arizona and Nevada.

== History ==
The Roaring Rapids were one of two of the significant hazards to navigation to steamboats, barges, and other shipping when ascending or descending the Colorado River between El Dorado Canyon and Callville, in the 19th Century. The other was the Ringbolt Rapids, 12 miles farther up the river.
