= Fortification Rock =

Former land feature on the Colorado River

Coordinates: 36°02′04″N 114°45′38″W

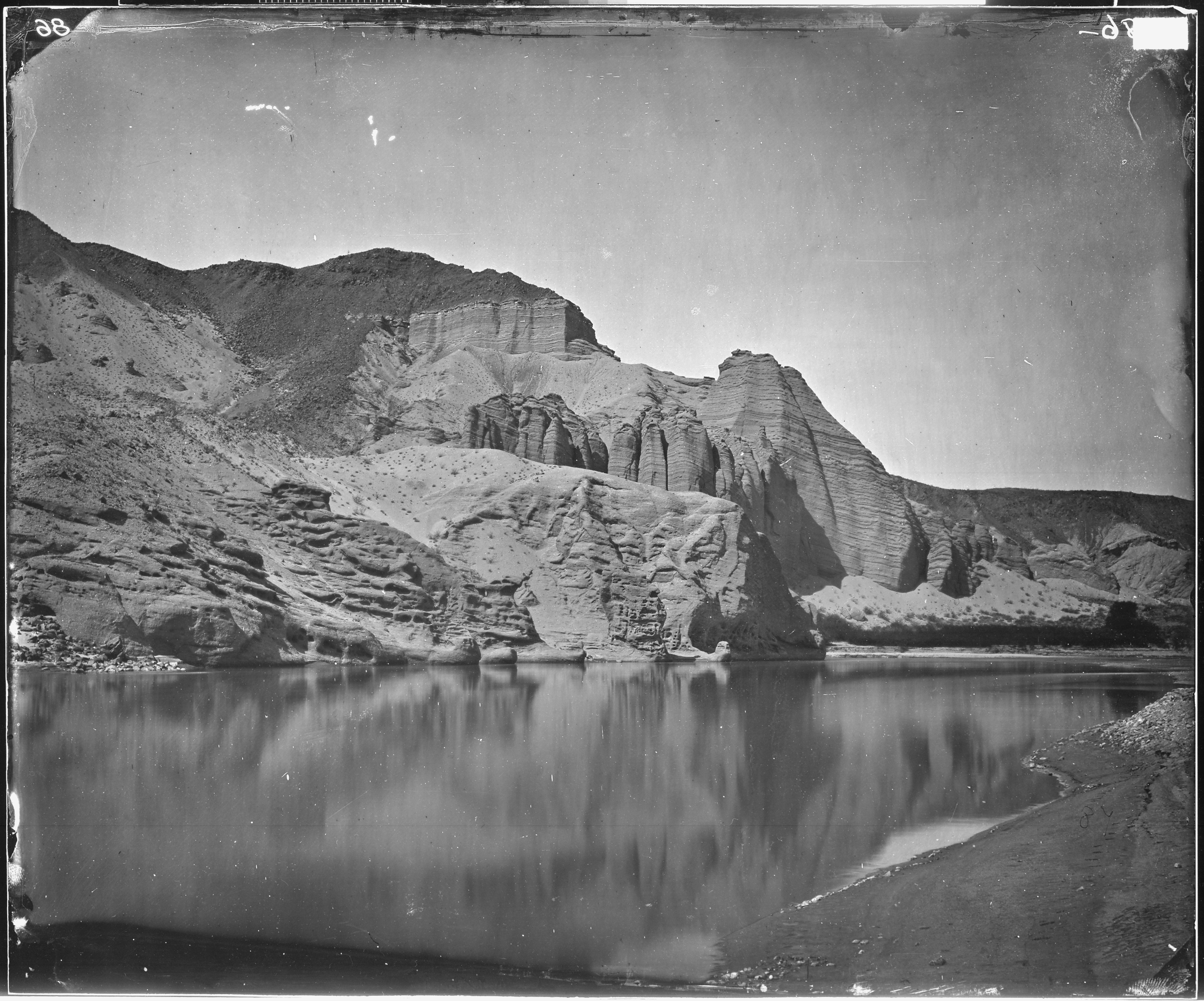
Fortification Rock in 1871

Fortification Rock, once a landmark hill on the Colorado River before it was inundated, now known as Rock Island, southernmost and tallest of the Boulder Islands in Lake Mead, Clark County, Nevada. It has an elevation of 1284 feet. Fortification Rock appears on the 1861 Geological Map No. 1; Rio Colorado of the West, explored by 1st Lieut. Joseph C. Ives, which shows Fortification Rock, Ives Camp #59 and the course of the Colorado River from its mouth on the Gulf of California to Las Vegas Wash and the location of its features and other expedition camps along the way.

== History ==
Fortification Rock, now an island, was before the building of Boulder Dam and the filling of Lake Mead, the tallest peak of a small range of hills, a landmark on the west bank of the Colorado River just above the top entrance to the Black Canyon of the Colorado. It was named by 1st Lieutenant Joseph Christmas Ives, March 11, 1858, during his 1857-1858 expedition to find the upper limit of navigation for the Colorado. It marked what he considered that highest point for steamboat navigation, during the June to October season of high water. He had left his steamboat Explorer behind at the mouth of the Black Canyon of the Colorado after it had struck Explorer's Rock at its mouth. While it was being repaired, he and the steamboat's captain and mate had ascended the canyon in a skiff, portaging over the rapids to camp two days later on the west riverbank at the foot of Fortification Rock, which had to him the appearance of a fortification. Ives climbed it to get a look at the land and course of the river upstream.

== Popular Culture ==
In the 2010 role-playing video game Fallout: New Vegas, Fortification Rock is the site of The Fort, base of the tyrannical Caesar.
