= Arizona (Ringbolt) Hot Springs =

Thermal spring

- Ringbolt Hot Springs; Arizona Hot Springs
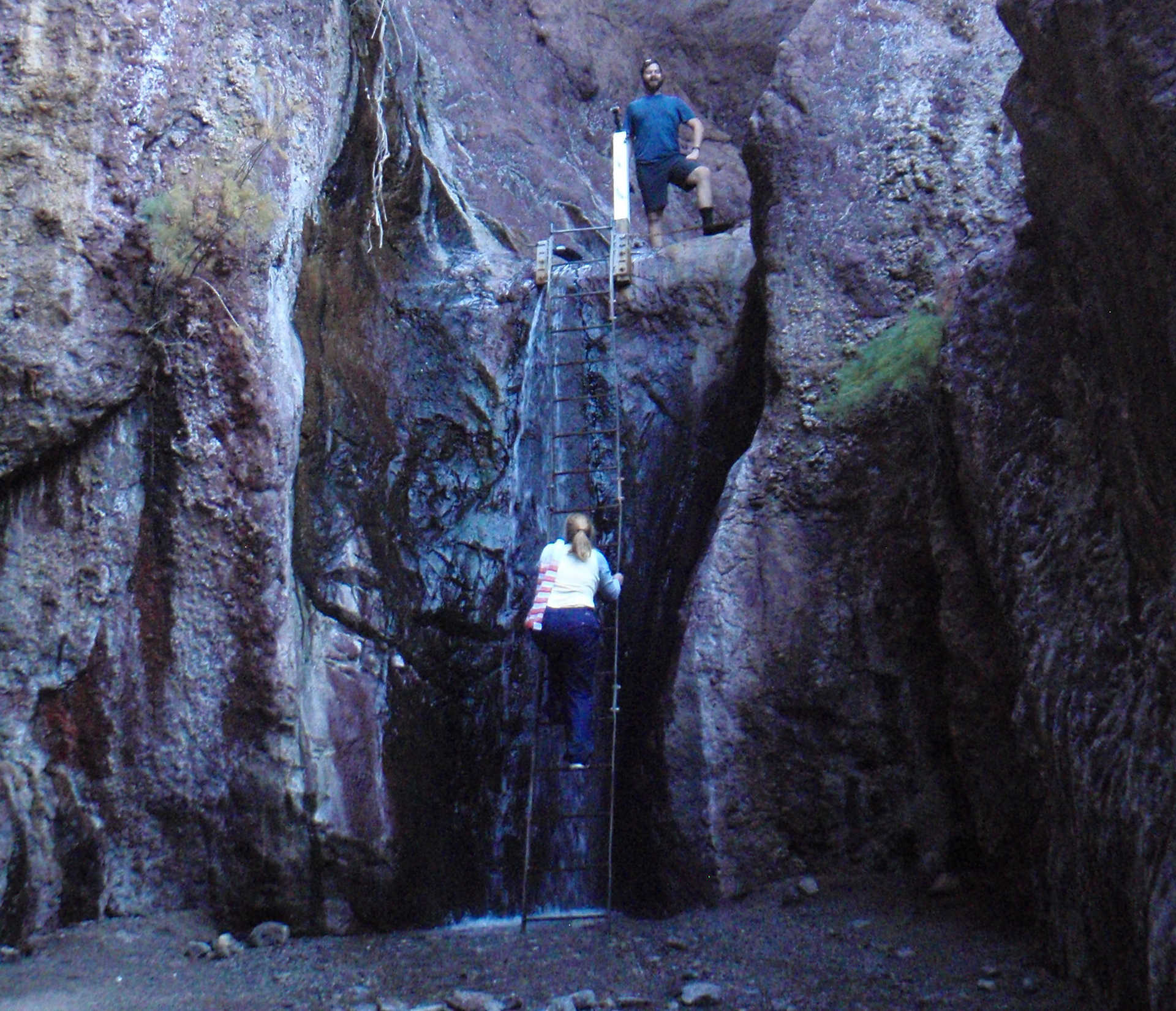
- Arizona (Ringbolt) hot spring
- Interactive map of Arizona (Ringbolt) Hot Springs
- Location: near Hoover Dam, Arizona
- Coordinates: 35°57′38″N 114°43′33″W
- Elevation: 1,545
- Temperature: 95 °F (35 °C)

NPS lake-mead-black-canyon-map

Arizona (Ringbolt) Hot Springs, also known as simply Ringbolt Hot Springs or Arizona Hot Springs, is a group of three geothermal springs located near Hoover Dam, Arizona. They are located on the Lake Mead National Recreation Area.

== Water profile ==
The hot mineral water emerges from the spring in the upper canyon at 110 °F. The water then flows over a 25-foot waterfall where it is cooled to 95 °F and collects in a gravel-bottomed rock soaking pool accessible by a ladder.

== Geography ==
The springs are close to Willow Beach, which is downstream from the Ringbolt Rapids in White Rock Canyon in the Black Canyon of the Colorado on the Arizona side of the river downstream from Hoover Dam. The area around the three main soaking pools have been stabilized with sand bags and rocks.

The most popular trail to the Hot Springs begins from a parking area north of US Hwy 93, 4.2 miles east of Hoover Dam. The trail is open most of the year but closed by the National Park Service in the summer due to dangers from extreme heat.

== See also ==
- List of hot springs in the United States
- List of hot springs in the world
