= Liverpool Landing =

Liverpool Landing may refer to:

- Liverpool Landing, Arizona, a ghost town and former river settlement on the Colorado River in Mohave County, Arizona, United States
- Liverpool Landing, Mississippi, a former river settlement on the Mississippi River in Yazoo County, Mississippi, United States
