= Arizona City =

Arizona City may refer to:

- Arizona City, Arizona in Pinal County, Arizona
- Arizona City (Yuma, Arizona) a settlement now known as Yuma, Arizona.
