= Williamsport, Arizona =

Ghost town in La Paz County, Arizona

Williamsport is a former mining town and present day ghost town, on the bank of the Colorado River in La Paz County, Arizona.

It was also a landing for steamboats of the Colorado River, first located in Yuma County from 1863 through the 1870s, then in Arizona Territory.

== History ==
In the fall of 1863, the Eureka Mining District was formed when silver strikes were made in the Chocolate Mountains of Arizona. Eureka Landing and Williamsport grew serving these new mines in the district. The landings and mining district appear in the 1865 Map of the new Arizona Territory. Eureka was a small cluster of adobe buildings on the riverbank, 47 miles up river from Arizona City and 2 miles up river from Eureka Landing. Across the Colorado River was Picacho, California and the Picacho Mining District.

== Today ==
Today the old landing of Williamsport on the riverbank has disappeared. It was located approximately at 33°01′48″N 114°35′38″W.
