= Nortons Landing, Arizona =

Former steamboat landing on the Colorado River

- Former settlement
- Location within the state of Arizona Nortons Landing (the United States)
- Coordinates: 33°03′02″N 114°38′39″W
- Country: United States
- State: Arizona
- County: La Paz
- Elevation: 16 ft (5 m)
- Time zone: UTC-7 (Mountain (MST))
  - Summer (DST): UTC-7 (MST)
- Area code: 928
- GNIS feature ID: 24540

Norton's Landing or Norton's, was a steamboat landing on the Colorado River, in what was then Yuma County, Arizona Territory. Today it is in La Paz County, Arizona. Nortons Landing is 52 miles upriver from Yuma, Arizona 4 miles above Picacho, California and 18 miles below the Clip, Arizona landing. It lies on a rocky point of land next to the river at 215 feet of elevation just east of Red Cloud Wash and Black Rock Wash, where roads to the district mines in the mountains met the Colorado River.

== History ==
Nortons Landing was developed for the Red Cloud Mine and other nearby mines of the Silver Mining District in the Trigo Mountains. The Silver District became active in 1879 when George Sills, Neils Johnson, George W. Norton, and Gus Crawford relocated many silver claims abandoned following the death of Jacob Snively in 1871.

The landing and settlement was named for George W. Norton who owned the Red Cloud Mine and its smelter at the landing, and had been the engineer in charge of constructing the first railroad bridge across the Colorado River, at Yuma, Arizona in 1877. The landing also had general store, and a post office called Norton's from June 4, 1883, to August 24, 1888, when it was discontinued, mail being sent to Yuma. It again had a post office from September 3, 1891, to March 13, 1894, when it was again discontinued and the town died. Norton's Landing continued until April, 1897. The Arizona Sentinel, Yuma, AZ, on 17 April 1897: The famous and well-known silver district mining town, Norton's Landing, is completely deserted, on account of the low price of silver and the mines closing down. The inhabitants have all removed to that flourishing mining camp, Picacho.

== Present site ==
The site is now a ghost town in La Paz County, Arizona. Only a few foundations, mining equipment, and slag from the reduction works remain.
