= Colorado City =

Colorado City may refer to some places in the United States:

- Colorado City, Arizona, in Mohave County, Arizona
- Colorado City, Colorado, in Pueblo County, Colorado
- Old Colorado City, district of Colorado Springs, Colorado
- Colorado City, Nevada, a ghost town in Clark County, Nevada
- Colorado City, Texas, in Mitchell County, Texas
- Colorado City, Yuma County, Arizona, a ghost town
