= Ringbolt Rapids =

Rapids in Black Canyon of the Colorado River

- Location within Arizona

Geography
- Coordinates: 35°57′41″N 114°43′46″W
- Interactive map of Ringbolt Rapids

Ringbolt Rapids are a series of rapids in the upper Black Canyon of the Colorado, 12 miles above the Roaring Rapids in the Colorado River between Arizona and Nevada.

== History ==
The Ringbolt Rapids were one of two of the significant hazards to navigation to steamboats, barges, and other shipping when ascending or descending the Colorado River between El Dorado Canyon and Callville, in the 19th century. Ringbolt Rapids gets its name from the ring bolt driven into the canyon wall there in 1866, to allow the pioneering steamboat Esmerelda to affix a line to it and draw itself up through the rapids by means of its capstan, to complete its voyage to Callville.
