= Drift Desert, Arizona =

Ghost town in La Paz County, Arizona

Coordinates: 33.4137°N 114.6469°W

Drift Desert is a former ranch and steamboat landing on the Colorado River, now a ghost town, in La Paz County, Arizona.

== History ==
Drift Desert was a ranch with a woodyard landing for the George Alonzo Johnson's steamboats on the Colorado River. It was located 102 miles up river from Yuma, Arizona and 29 miles below La Paz, in what was then Yuma County, Arizona. Drift Desert appears on the 1861 Geological Map No. 1. Prepared by J.S. Newberry, M.D. Geologist to the Expedition. Explorations and Surveys. War Department. Map No. 1. Rio Colorado of the West, explored by 1st Lieut. Joseph C. Ives, which shows the course of the Colorado River from its mouth on the Gulf of California to Las Vegas Wash and the location of its features and expedition camps along the way.

== Today ==
Today the old landing of Drift Desert on the riverbank has disappeared.
