= Aubrey Landing, Arizona =

- Ghost town
- Location within Arizona Location within the United States
- Coordinates: 34°18′00″N 114°04′39″W
- Country: United States
- State: Arizona
- County: Mohave
- Founded: circa 1860
- Abandoned: circa 1886
- Named for: Francois Xavier Aubrey
- Elevation: 646 ft (197 m)
- Time zone: UTC-7 (MST (no DST))
- Post Office Opened: October 2, 1866
- Post Office Closed: November 3, 1886

Aubrey Landing, Aubrey City or Aubrey is a ghost town at the mouth of the Bill Williams River in southern Mohave County, Arizona, United States. The town was founded before 1865 and was abandoned sometime after 1886. Aubrey Landing was inundated when Lake Havasu was formed.

== History ==
The site of Aubrey Landing was passed over by the 1854 expedition of Captain Whipple for the Railroad Survey near the 35th Parallel, and was the location of Camp #33 for the 1858 expedition of 1st Lieutenant Ives, to explore the Colorado River of West in the steamboat Explorer.

Aubrey Landing was the first construction that became the town of Aubrey City sometime before 1865 during the Civil War in Arizona. The unknown founder named the river settlement after Francois Xavier Aubrey, a famous American pioneer from a decade earlier. The town was ideally located on the east bank of the Colorado River at its confluence with the Bill Williams River, on the north bank of the Bill Williams River. It served the mines of the Bill Williams Mining District. It was 12.5 miles from the Planet Company copper mines, 11.2 miles from the Mineral Hill mines and 9.6 miles from the Empire Flat mines.

In 1865, a break in copper prices left the town almost deserted. However, enough people stayed in Aubrey City and the nearby mines, prompting the establishment of the Aubrey post office in 1866. Little had changed though by 1878, the town never grew to the size anticipated by the owners. The town consisted of the usual mining camp structures, as well as a hotel, saloon, and a general store. The town supported a small population for almost ten years more. In 1886, the post office closed and the town soon after.

== The site today ==
The site of this old river landing and mining town is lost below Lake Havasu.

== GNIS location of site in error ==
The Official GNIS location of 34°18′00″N 114°04′38″W, is obviously incorrect, not being located at the confluence of the Colorado and Bill Williams Rivers or even under Lake Havasu. Given the evidence of the 1866 Edward Fairman map and drawing it should be located at 34°18′15″N 114°08′17″W directly north of Parker Dam.

== See also ==
- Aubrey Hills
