= Liverpool Landing, Arizona =

Former settlement in Mohave County, Arizona, US

Coordinates: 34°28′41″N 114°22′42″W

Liverpool Landing, a ghost town and former river settlement on the Colorado River, in Mohave County, Arizona, United States, now submerged under Lake Havasu.

== History ==
Liverpool Landing was a woodyard landing for fueling the steamboats of George Alonzo Johnson's Colorado Steam Navigation Company of steamboats of the Colorado River. It was located 242 miles upriver from Yuma and 22 miles upriver from Aubrey Landing. It was two miles up and across the river from Chimehuevis Landing another woodyard and 58 miles below Fort Mohave the next woodyard.

The local indigenous Mohave people supplied the wood to the landing.

== Present day ==
The site of Liverpool Landing, located near present-day Lake Havasu City, was submerged under Lake Havasu in the 1930s. The location of Liverpool Landing can be seen on the March 1911, Parker, Arizona, U. S. Geological Survey Topographic Map.

== See also ==
- Aubrey Landing, Arizona
- Steamboat transport on the Colorado River
