= Iretaba City, Arizona =

Former steamboat landing and mining town

Coordinates: 35°00′53″N 114°38′03″W

Iretaba City was a short lived steamboat landing and mining town in Mohave County, Arizona, United States.

== History ==
Soldiers from Fort Mohave established the Iretaba Mining District in early 1863 after finding copper five miles west of the river in the Dead Mountains of California. First the landing at Mohave City was founded near Fort Mohave. Iretaba City soon followed in January 1864, located two miles down river from Mohave City. It was supplanted when the ferry and landing of Hardyville was established in March 1864 in order to serve the nearby mines of the newly discovered San Francisco Mining District. This new landing was supported by George A. Johnson and Company, the steamboat company.

== Site today ==
Nothing remains at the site.
