= Fort Aubrey =

- Fort Aubrey Site
- U.S. National Register of Historic Places
- Location within Kansas Location within the United States
- Location: Near Sand Creek, east of Syracuse, Kansas
- Coordinates: 37°59′10″N 101°40′15″W
- Area: 1 acre (0.40 ha)
- Built: 1864
- NRHP reference No.: 78001281
- Added to NRHP: August 31, 1978

Fort Aubrey, in eastern Hamilton County, Kansas, was established by the US Army in the 1850s. It originally had no name and was not made a truly permanent post until 1865. It was originally established to serve as a temporary resting place for traveling troops. The location of the fort is based upon a recommendation by François Xavier Aubry, for whom the fort is named.

The intermittent camp was established at the site of a spring fifteen feet wide and three feet deep. The spring was on Spring Creek, near the Arkansas River, and was on the Santa Fe Trail. The spring was used by soldiers, civilian travelers and Indians as they passed through the area.

The camp had no name for most of its existence. Some structures were built there and these were at times left completely unused. Sometimes details of a few men stayed in the camp to keep it ready for use.

The camp was named Camp Wynkoop in May 1864, in honor of Fort Lyon's commander, Maj. Edward W. Wynkoop. Around that time a stage station was built at Camp Wynkoop. When the camp was again abandoned in August the stage station remained. The camp was in a dangerous area, as hostile Indians at least once killed four soldiers working near the camp.

Indian troubles in the area increased, so in August or September 1865 a permanent fort, named Fort Aubrey, was built by two companies of the 48th Wisconsin Infantry. The permanent fort was short lived, being closed April 15, 1866.

In 1978, the site of the fort was listed on the National Register of Historic Places.
