= Gridiron, Sonora =

Colorado River steamboat landing in Mexico

Gridiron was a steamboat landing and woodyard on the lower Colorado River in Sonora state of northwestern Mexico,.

It supplied fuel wood to heat the steam boilers of the shipping steamboats on the Colorado River from 1854 to the late 1870s.

== Geography ==
Gridiron was located 17 miles (27 km) above Port Famine, and 28 miles (45 km) below Ogden's Landing. Gridiron lay along the east bank of the river 47 miles (76 km) below what is now the Sonora/Mexico—Arizona/U.S. border.

== See also ==
- Steamboat transport on the Colorado River
