= François Xavier Aubry =

French Canadian merchant and explorer

- Born: December 3, 1824; Saint-Justin, Quebec, Canada
- Died: August 18, 1854 (aged 29); Albuquerque, New Mexico
- Cause of death: Knife attack
- Occupations: Merchant and explorer of the American Southwest
- Parents: Joseph Aubry; Magdeleine Lupien

François Xavier Aubry (Note: Various sources spell his surname as "Aubry", "Aubrey", or "Aubray".) (French pronunciation: [fʁɑ̃swa ɡzavje obʁi]; December 3, 1824 – August 18, 1854) was a French Canadian merchant and explorer of the American Southwest. His achievements include speed records riding the Santa Fe Trail and early exploration of the 35th parallel north west of the North American continental divide.

== Youth and early ventures ==
Aubry was born to Joseph and Magdeleine (Lupien) Aubry in Saint-Justin, Quebec on December 3, 1824. There he grew up on a farm. When he was 18, he moved to St. Louis where he worked as a store clerk. After seeing the profits available for merchants transporting goods along the Santa Fe Trail, Aubry saved his money to purchase several wagons and draft animals. He then obtained a line of credit with which to purchase trade goods and left on his first trip down Santa Fe trail from Independence on May 9, 1846 as part of a trader's caravan. After selling his goods in Santa Fe, Aubry returned with enough profits to fully pay off his loans. In 1847 he moved to Independence, Missouri and began working full-time as a freighter along the trail.

While working the Santa Fe Trail, Aubry decided that speed was the key to maximizing his opportunities. Toward this end he began making two annual trips along the trail instead of the customary single trip per year. The increased money flow produced allowed him to purchase better draft animals and to haul goods in both directions and looking for ways to increase his speed. One effort to reduce the time spent on the 800 miles (1,300 km) return journey came when he left Santa Fe on December 22, 1847. Despite being harassed by Indians, highwaymen, and adverse winter weather, Aubry reached Independence in only 14 days, beating the previous record by 10½ days. In recognition of the accomplishment, newspapers dubbed him "Telegraph" Aubry and claimed the effort was "bordering on the supernatural".

Following this success, Aubry looked for ways to further increase his speed. In a desire to make three trips during 1848, Aubry left Missouri in mid-March, before enough grass had grown to provide fodder for his beasts of burden, and instead fed them by hauling a supply of feed corn. Aubry made the return trip from Santa Fe to Independence in 8 days and 10 hours. For his second return trip of the year, he positioned spare horses along the route. Leaving Santa Fe on the morning of September 12, 1848, Aubry carried a copy of the Santa Fe Republican with news of his departure. His journey was hampered by rain and mud but he managed to arrive in Independence on the evening of September 17 after 5 days and 16 hours on the trail. As a result of the ride, he won US$5,000 in wagers and the name "Skimmer of the Plains".

Convinced that his record would not be beaten, Aubry then moved to Santa Fe. Desiring to explore the potential market in the city of Chihuahua he led a caravan to the city in February 1849. Seeking to bypass the expense of goods purchased in Missouri, his second caravan crossed Texas to purchase goods in Victoria and then proceeding to Chihuahua via El Paso. This new route while financially rewarding proved to be difficult and Aubry only made the trip one more time. In late 1851, Aubry was back on the Santa Fe Trail where he discovered an alternate to a portion of the Cimarron branch of the trail that reduced the distance to travel by 52 miles (84 km) and provided access to a waterhole in an otherwise inhospitable section of the trail. This detour became known as the "Aubry Cutoff".

== To California ==
In 1852, Aubry's attention turned to California when he decided to take a caravan down the Rio Grande and Gila Rivers. From there he proceeded to San Francisco, via Tucson and Los Angeles, arriving with 3500 sheep, 100 mules, and 10 wagons of supplies.

After selling his goods, Aubry's return party included 10 Americans, 6 Mexicans, and a Negro cook. Aubry wished to return to Santa Fe by as direct a route as possible. His party crossed the Tejon Pass on July 10, 1853 before reaching the Colorado River on July 23. Aubry's crossing point is estimated to be 20 miles (32 km) north of the mouth of the Bill Williams River. From there his route is uncertain due to lack of place names. Aubry's descriptions of cedar, pine, and pinyon trees, combined with mentions of deep canyons, indicates he crossed Arizona's central mountains. Beginning on August 3 the party was harassed by a group of Indians that Aubry called "Garroteros". (Probably Yuman or Mohave) The harassment changed on August 14 when a chief, feigning friendship, approached Aubry's campsite. At the end of a meeting the chief took Aubry's right hand, a signal that resulted in his warriors pulling out hidden clubs and attacking Aubry's party. The attack resulted in nearly every member of the party being wounded but they were able to repel the attack with their Colt revolvers, killing 25 attackers and wounding others in the process. Following this the party continued to fight skimishes with the hostile natives until they reached Zuni Pueblo, New Mexico on September 6.

Following his return to Albuquerque, Aubry gave a report of his journey to New Mexico Territorial Governor David Meriwether, writing, "I am satisfied that a railroad may be run almost mathematically direct from Zuñi to Colorado [the river], and from thence to the Tejon pass in California." He also spoke to Lt. Amiel W. Whipple who was preparing an exploration of the area through which Aubry had just traveled as part of the Pacific Railroad Surveys. Aubry's journey also discovered the presence of gold in what is now northern Arizona when he discovered the metal first near the Colorado River and claimed that it was being used by Indians for the manufacture of bullets. It was not however evident as to whether the Indians obtained their gold locally or if it was acquired from a different area and brought to the region.

In late 1853, Aubry prepared to make a second trip to California. With the assistance of other Santa Fe businessmen, he organized a drive consisting of 50,000 sheep. Aubry reached Los Angeles on January 10, 1854 before proceeding to San Francisco. After selling the sheep he prepared to return from San Jose, California on July 6 with a group of 60 men. This larger group traveled straight from San Jose to Albuquerque, arriving on August 18 without incident.

== Death ==
Shortly after his arrival in Albuquerque, Aubry went to a store operated by the Mercure brothers to buy a drink. In the store he discovered Richard Hanson Weightman, a former Territorial Delegate to the United States Congress and editor of Albuquerque's Amigo Pais. Weightman had published an article with which Aubry had disagreed and an argument arose between the men. The argument escalated to a fight and Aubry drew his gun but was mortally wounded by Weightman's knife after the firearm misfired. Following the incident, Weightman was arrested on murder charges but acquitted during the trial when it was decided he had acted in self-defense. Aubry was buried in Santa Fe's Rosaria Cemetery.

Following his death, Aubry's diary was discovered in his saddlebags. In September 1854, Missouri newspapers published an account of Aubry's final journey which spawned interest in a railroad route along the 35th parallel north. Eventually the Atlantic and Pacific Railroad was built mostly along the route that Aubry had explored.

== Legacy ==
A number of places were named for the explorer, many spelled "Aubrey" due to misspellings by early map makers. Fort Aubrey, located in a place suggested by Aubry and used to protect the Aubrey Cutoff, is in Kansas. In Arizona, the town of Aubrey Landing (a.k.a. Aubry City or Aubry) was located near the confluence of the Colorado and Bill Williams Rivers, while two mountains, Aubrey Peak (Hualapai Mountains) and Aubrey Peak (Rawhide Mountains), are in Mohave County The Aubrey Valley, in Yavapai County, bears his name as does a street in Prescott.
