= Gila City, Arizona =

- Ghost town
- Location within Arizona Location within the United States
- Coordinates: 32°45′18″N 114°21′46″W
- Country: United States
- State: Arizona
- County: Yuma
- Founded: 1858
- Abandoned: 1863
- Elevation: 233 ft (71 m)

Population (2011)
  - Total: 0
- Time zone: UTC-7 (MST (no DST))
- Post Office opened: December 24, 1858
- Post Office closed: July 14, 1863

Gila City is a ghost town in Yuma County in the U.S. state of Arizona. The town was settled in 1858 in what was then the New Mexico Territory.

== History ==
Gila City was founded on the south bank of the Gila River, 19 miles east of the confluence of the Gila and Colorado rivers. Also known as Ligurta, the town was established as a result of Arizona's first major gold rush, when Colonel Jacob Snively led a party of prospectors to a placer deposit along the Gila River in and around Monitor Gulch, which emerges from the Gila Mountains to the south. A booming gold camp, Gila City developed nearly overnight as prospectors rushed to the site. The Butterfield Overland Mail route passed through the boom town and one of its stations, Swivelers lay a mile to the east at the eastern edge of the placer deposits where a post office was established for Gila City on December 24, 1858.

The Gila placers were worked for eight years by thousands of miners. They worked the plateaus and canyons nearby, panning out $20 to $125 a day in gold dust, and nuggets weighing up to 22 ounces each were deposited at the Wells Fargo office in Los Angeles.

In March 1859, the Gila Mining and Transportation Company sent a cargo to Robinson's Landing, in the schooner Arno. This cargo included a steam engine to pump water to the Gila mine that lay a mile from the Gila River. Included in the cargo was a disassembled 125 foot stern-wheel steamboat, built by Henry Owens. The nameless steamboat had been sent to equip their own lower cost steamboat line, as a rival to the George A. Johnson Company, however it was lost there before it was ever unloaded. The tidal bore tore loose Arno's anchors, driving the ship on a sandbar holing and sinking it in a half-hour with the ship and cargo a total loss. Without the steam engine providing water for washing out the gold at the mine, these American miners used to the plentiful water of California's placers in the north, could not work it profitably and the town soon was mostly abandoned. Only Sonora miners familiar with dry wash techniques stayed and made it pay.

In 1859 Lieutenant Sylvester Mowry, reported about 100 men and several families working the gravels at Gila City and saw more than $20 washed from 8 shovelfuls of dirt. Some miners were paid $3 a day plus board to work lower grade deposits. Most of the gold was recovered by first drywashing, then by wetwashing the dry-panned concentrates at the Gila River.

Flooding of the Gila River in the Great Flood of 1862 destroyed the remnants of the town, and the post office was discontinued on July 14, 1863. Most of the population had already moved on to the new gold rush at La Paz. The best of the placers continued to be worked on a reduced scale until 1865, all the known productive ground was worked over at least once since then. A few large-scale operations were later attempted over the years, but these were unsuccessful.

== Today ==
All trace of the town is gone, but small-scale mining continues today. The area of gold-bearing gravel extends from 1/4 mile east of Dome to 3 miles west of Dome, but most placer mining was centered on Monitor Gulch, 1 1/2 miles west of Dome. Most of the gold in the gravels was found at or near bedrock in gulches, but much gold was recovered from bench gravels in the area.
