= Blankenship Bend =

Landform on the Colorado River, Arizona

Coordinates: 34°35′40″N 114°25′51″W

Blankenship Bend is a bend on the Colorado River in Mohave County, Arizona, US. It lies at an elevation of 564 feet (172 m).

== History ==
In the 19th century, Blankenship Bend formed a horseshoe shaped turn of the river of 180 degrees, that the steamboat men called the Grand Turn, because it was the largest turn on the Colorado River that was navigated by steamboats. It lay 157 miles (253 km) above Fort Yuma.
