= Potholes, California =

Former gold camp in California

Coordinates: 32°49′44″N 114°30′17″W

Potholes is a former gold camp and settlement in Imperial County, California. The settlement was located on the railroad line 4 miles (6.4 km) northeast of Bard along the Colorado River near the site of the Laguna Dam.

== History ==
These diggings were probably the ones previously worked by Spanish miners from Mission San Pedro y San Pablo de Bicuñer in 1781. Knowledge of location of the mines was lost with the death of the miners in the Yuma War.

In early 1859, placer gold was found fifteen miles above Fort Yuma at the Pot Holes on the west bank of the Colorado River. Placer mining in the area continued into the later 19th century. Dredging the Colorado River for gold in the vicinity of Pot Holes was attempted in 1900–1901, but it was a failure. Most of the gold was too fine to be caught in the mechanism of the dredge used.

The town of Potholes was established during the construction of the Laguna Dam and the All American Canal. A post office operated at Potholes from 1905 to 1909 and from 1920 to 1922. The cemetery for the settlement was located a mile to the south along the west bank of the river.
