= Picacho, California =

Unincorporated community in California, United States

Picacho
- Unincorporated community
- Location in California Picacho (the United States)
- Coordinates: 33°01′23″N 114°36′40″W
- Country: United States
- State: California
- County: Imperial County
- Elevation: 203 ft (62 m)

California Historical Landmark
- Official name: Picacho Mines
- Reference no.: 193

Picacho (Spanish for "Big Peak") is an unincorporated community in Imperial County, California. It is located on the Colorado River 29 miles (47 km) south-southeast of Palo Verde, at an elevation of 203 feet (62 m).

Picacho, now a ghost town, was an early mining town on the Colorado River. It was named Picacho, Spanish for "big peak", after a nearby mountain of the same name.

The original townsite itself is beneath Imperial Reservoir, but remains of some of the ore mills are above the lake level. The area is within Picacho State Recreation Area. The site is now registered as California Historical Landmark #193.

== History ==
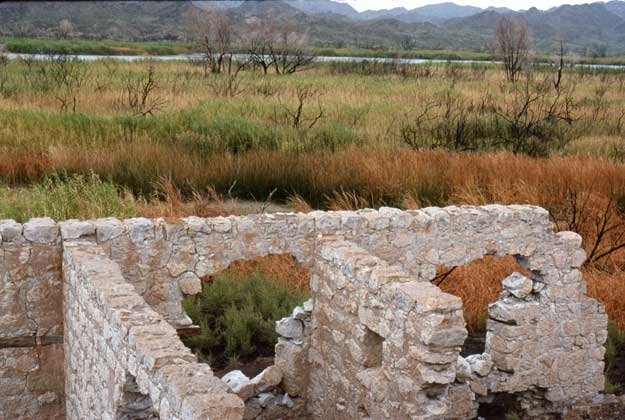
Remains of the old ore processing mill overlook the Colorado River.

Spaniards probably mined placer gold in the area as early as 1780. The area became very active when prospector Jose Maria Mendivil discovered gold veins in the nearby hills in the early 1860s. Prospectors originally used the dry placering method because the scarcity of water did not permit regular gold panning methods. Dry placering consisted of shoveling sand and gravel onto a blanket and shaking the blanket until only the heavier gold particles remain. A "blanketful" of gold could yield over $20 in gold at 1860s prices.

Mendivil laid out the townsite of Rio, which was soon renamed Picacho. During Picacho's heyday Mendivil sold his claims and homesteaded a section of land along the river bank where he laid out the town, naming the streets after his daughters. The town had a population of 2,500, three stores, three elementary schools, numerous saloons, and was served by steamboats of the Colorado River that connected the mining towns along the Colorado River. Besides mining, men were employed on the stages, as ranchers and cowboys on neighboring homesteads, and many men labored as woodcutters in the desert washes to fuel the boilers of the paddlewheel steamboats that called at the town landing 48 miles up river from Arizona City.

The Neahr Stamp Mill ruin remains clearly visible on the shore. The huge building was constructed in 1877-8 of hand cut native rhyolite stone. David Neahr, a Yuma Businessman, enlarged an earlier mill to ten stamps, successfully crushing ore from Medivil's Apache Claim. Neahr expanded the operation and bought up additional claims but was forced into bankruptcy when his manager embezzled $7,000. the Neahr mill had subsequent owners but none of the operations there were overly successful or productive.

Stephen A. Dorsey greatly exaggerated Picacho's productiveness. He formed the California King Gold Mines Co. with speculator's money and built a 450-short-ton (410 t) stamp mill. A narrow gauge railroad was constructed to haul ore from the mines at the peak to the mill on the river. The best years of production were 1904-1906 after which Dorsey left with his profits. The mine payroll peaked at 700 men. Declining ore quality and mill accidents ended most of the organized mining efforts by around 1910, and the filling of the lake behind Imperial Dam flooded what was left of the original townsite in 1938.

A post office operated at Picacho from 1894 to 1926, moving in 1926.

== Geography ==
The townsite is at 33°01′23″N 114°36′40″W, at an elevation of 203 feet (62 m) above sea level.

== Picacho in fiction ==
Picacho was the setting of Zane Grey’s 1923 novel Wanderer of the Wasteland, later made into a silent film.

== California Historical Landmark ==
California Historical Landmark number 193 reads:

NO. 193 PICACHO MINES - Opened by placer miners after 1852, the gold mines expanded into hard rock quarrying by 1872. Picacho employed 700 miners at its peak from 1895 to 1900. Mill accidents, low ore quality, and the loss of cheap river transport with the building of Laguna Dam led to numerous periods of inactivity. With ores far from worked out, the Picacho Mines, using modern techniques, again resumed operations in 1984.

== See also ==
- List of ghost towns in California
- Steamboat transport on the Colorado River
- California Historical Landmarks in Imperial County
- California Historical Landmark
