= Ogden's Landing =

Ogden's Landing was a steamboat landing and woodyard, owned by former Colorado River ferry partner of George Alonzo Johnson, supplying wood to the steamboats on the lower Colorado River in Sonora, Mexico, from the mid 1854 to the late 1870s. Ogden's Landing was located 28 miles (45 km) above Gridiron and 24 miles (39 km) below Pedrick's in Sonora until 1856, when it became part of New Mexico Territory, until it became Arizona Territory in 1863. Ogden's Landing lay along the east bank of the river 19 miles below what is now the Sonora - Arizona border.
