= Simonsville, Nevada =

Simonsville
- Ghost town
- Location within the state of Nevada Simonsville (the United States)
- Coordinates: 36°33′46″N 114°26′40″W
- Country: United States
- State: Nevada
- County: Clark
- Elevation: 1,325 ft (404 m)
- Time zone: UTC-8 (Pacific (PST))
  - Summer (DST): UTC-7 (PDT)
- GNIS feature ID: 851286

Simonsville is a ghost town in Clark County, Nevada, that was located on the east bank of the Muddy River west of the south end of the Overton Airport in the Moapa Valley.

== History ==
Simonsville was originally called Mill Point for the grist mill first built there by James Leithead. The name was changed to Simonsville in December 1865, named after Orrawell Simons who would build another mill there in 1866. Simonsville was abandoned in 1870 like most of the Mormon farms and settlements in the Moapa Valley, due to a tax dispute with the Nevada state government, and it was never reoccupied.

== Today ==
The site of Mill Point and Simonsville are now mostly lost and occupied by a Clark County Flood control bridge and Airport road re-alignments.
