= Murphyville, Arizona =

Lost mining camp in Mohave County, Arizona

Coordinates: 35°26′14″N 114°38′37″W

Murphyville was a short lived placer gold mining camp 12 miles below El Dorado Canyon, on the east bank of the Colorado River in Arizona Territory, in 1891.

The site today is now lost under Lake Mohave.
