= Quartette, Nevada =

Mining settlement in Nevada, United States

Coordinates: 35°25′53″N 114°39′18″W

Quartette or Quartette Mill or Quartette Landing, was a mining settlement, location of the stamp mill of the Quartette Mining Company, owner of the largest mine in the Searchlight Mining District and a steamboat landing on the Colorado River, in what is now Clark County, Nevada. It lay at an elevation of 646 feet.

== History ==
This river settlement originated in 1900, with the decision of the directors of the Quartette Mining Company that it would be more profitable to crush their own ore than freight it 23 miles by wagon to Manvel, then ship it by rail from there to the smelter at Needles. No adequate supply of water being found near their mine, they decided to locate their 20 stamp mill and a cyanide plant on the west bank of the Colorado River and haul the ore the twelve miles to the mill from the mine by wagon. In May 1901 the company decided to build a 14-mile narrow gauge railroad to haul its ore to the landing. During this period as the mill, steamboat landing and railroad were established, the mine had a post office called Quartette from September 15, 1900, to Sept. 15, 1902.

Building the railroad began with grading the route, in November 1901. The rails, the locomotive and the cars were delivered at Needles about the same time and were shipped up river by barge towed by a Colorado Steam Navigation Company steamboat. However within sight of the landing the barge stuck fast on a sandbar and could not be extracted over the next 3 months despite strenuous efforts to do so. Only the return of higher water on the river allowed the barge to be freed and landed at Quartette in February, 1902. Future rail shipments came by rail on the California Eastern Railway to Manvel, and then overland by wagon to Searchlight and the rail-line construction site. By March 6 miles of track had been laid and its locomotive and cars became operational, speeding construction. By May 1902 the railroad was completed, and the train ran twice a day carrying ore to the mill and returning with goods and passengers if boats had visited the landing at Quartette. This rail and steamer route became favored as it was the most rapid means of getting people and freight to and from Needles.

In 1903, there was a strike that idled the railroad and the mines. During that time water was found that made it possible to set up milling at the mine and a new stamp mill was built. By 1906 the railroad had become idle and the old mill was relocated to the new mill site, making it a 40 stamp mill.

On March 31, 1907, the Barnwell and Searchlight Railway reached Searchlight and the river landing was made obsolete. The rails of the Quartette railroad were taken up in 1910 and used to build the Yellow Pine Mining Company line between the Union Pacific Railroad line at Jean to the mining boomtown of Goodsprings.

== The site today ==
The site of Quartette is now covered by Lake Mohave.
