= Eureka Landing, Arizona =

Former mining town and steamboat landing

Eureka or Eureka Landing, is a former mining town and steamboat landing, now a ghost town, on the Arizona bank of the Colorado River in what is now La Paz County, Arizona. It was originally located in Yuma County, Arizona from 1863 through the 1870s.

== History ==
In the fall of 1863, the Eureka Mining District was formed when silver strikes were made in the Chocolate Mountains of Arizona. Eureka Landing and Williamsport grew serving these new mines in the district. The landings and mining district appear in the 1865 Map of the new Arizona Territory. Eureka was a small cluster of adobe buildings on the riverbank, 45 miles up river from Arizona City and 2 miles down river from Williamsport. Across the river was the Picacho Mining District.

== Today ==
Today the Eureka Landing on the riverbank has disappeared. Only the Eureka Mine at 33°02′19″N 114°33′54″W, abandoned in a canyon above the site remains to indicate its location.
