= Cochan (sternwheeler) =

Colorado River steamboat

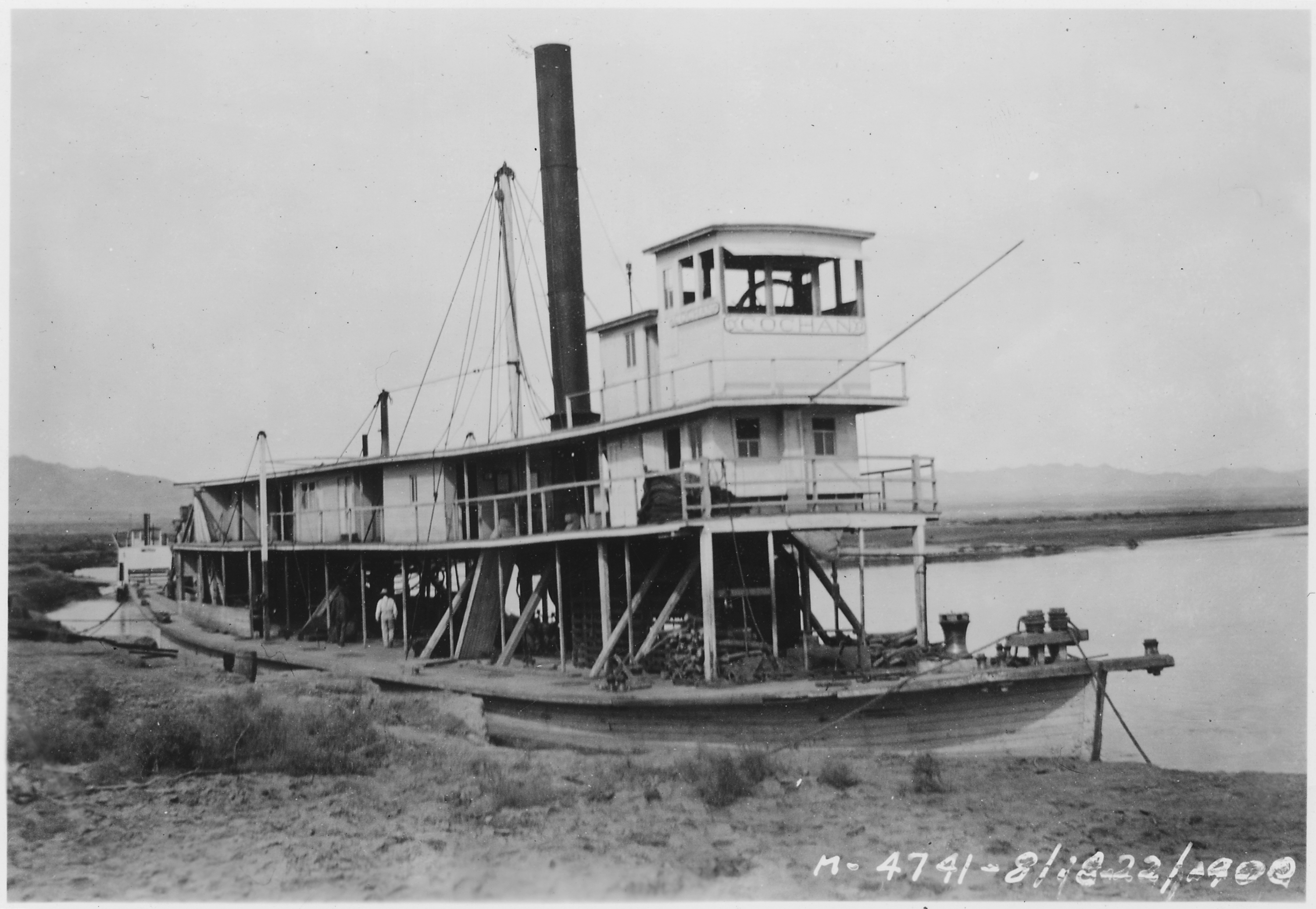
View showing steamboat Cochan on the Colorado River near Yuma, Arizona in 1900. A photograph of the Cochan taken in 1900. Cochan was the last stern-wheel steamboat running on the Colorado River for the Colorado Steam Navigation Company, between 1899 and 1909. Cochan was sold to the U.S Reclamation Service in 1909. Not required by the Service, Cochan was dismantled in 1910.

Cochan, (Quechan) last of the stern-wheel steamboats built for the Colorado Steam Navigation Company (CSNC). It ran on the Colorado River between 1900 and 1909.

== History ==
In 1899 Issac Polhamus and Jack Mellon owners of the CSNC had to choose one of their remaining steamboats to rebuild to keep up with the competition. The old boats were wearing out in competition with newer boats. Both the 23-year-old Mohave II and the Gila, with 35 years on the Colorado River, had worn hulls only kept going with a lot of maintenance. The Gila despite its age had better engines, and so it was chosen.

In late 1899 the Gila's machinery was refurbished and its hull rebuilt for $25,000 in the shipyard at Yuma, Arizona. Launched on November 8, 1899, it was renamed the Cochan it was two tons lighter and 14 feet shorter than the Gila. Cochan displaced 234 tons, was 135 feet long, 31 feet wide beam, and drew only 11 inches of water unloaded. It could carry 125 tons of freight, drawing less than two feet of water.

In January 1900, the Cochan began carrying freight to the Quartette and Searchlight mines, competing with the St. Vallier of the Santa Ana Mining Company. In 1900, Polhamus and Mellon built a new barge, the Siløs J. Lenis for the Cochan to tow and scrapped all their old barges. The new barge was 150 feet long and 32 feet on the beam. In early 1903, the Colorado River Transportation Company entered the competition with the Searchlight.

In 1905 the new Los Angeles and Salt Lake Railroad, California Eastern Railway and Arizona and California Railroad ended the use of steamboats on the upper river and they all moved down to Yuma. The remaining steamboats worked on irrigation projects on the lower part of the river and on repairing the 1904-1907 breach in the Alamo Canal, that directed the Colorado River into the Salton Sink and created the Salton Sea before it was repaired. The last project, the construction of the Laguna Dam ended steam navigation on the river.

== Fate of the Cochan ==
Just before the completion of the Laguna Dam, some 14 miles above Yuma, ended steam navigation on the lower Colorado River, the Colorado Steam Navigation Company sold its remaining boats including the Cochan to the United States Reclamation Service in 1909. Not required by the Service, Cochan was dismantled in 1910.
