= Port Famine, Sonora =

Port in Mexico, 1854–1870s

Port Famine Puerto Carestía
- Location in Mexico

Location
- Country: Mexico
- Location: Colorado River Delta
- Coordinates: 31°54′59″N 115°2′16″W

Details
- Opened: 1854
- Closed: 1870s

Port Famine was a steamboat landing and woodyard, supplying wood to the steamboats on the lower Colorado River in Sonora, Mexico, from the 1854 to the late 1870s.

== Geography ==
Port Famine was located 40 miles (64 km) above Robinson's Landing and 17 miles (27 km) below Gridiron. Port Famine lay along the east bank of the river 64 miles (103 km) below what is now the Sonora–Arizona border.
