= Jaeger City, California =

Coordinates: 32°43′52″N 114°37′47″W

Jaeger City, or Jaegerville, was a former settlement in what is now Imperial County, California, at Jaeger's Ferry on the Colorado River a mile downstream from Fort Yuma. It was named for L. J. F. Jaeger who ran the ferry there from 1851.

== History ==
Jaeger City, then in San Diego County, California, was the first and largest settlement near the fort until 1862. It began as a stockade for defense of the ferry and its operators against the Quechan, and a collection of tents. It was a station of the San Antonio-San Diego Mail Line from 1857 to 1860. At its height it consisted of the Fort Yuma Station of the Butterfield Overland Mail and its local office, a hotel, two blacksmiths, two stores and other dwellings. Colorado City begun in 1853 lay across the river and Arizona City lay a mile above it across from Fort Yuma.

Jaeger City was destroyed, along with Colorado City across the river, in the Great Flood of 1862. Jaeger City was never rebuilt. Jaeger's Ferry was rebuilt and Colorado City also, on higher ground as part of Arizona City, later renamed Yuma, Arizona, in 1873, and the ferry relocated there across from the fort.

== The site today ==
The site is located southeast of Winterhaven, California. All trace of the settlement has been washed away by the flooding of the river since 1862.

== See also ==
- List of ghost towns in California
