= Pedrick's, Arizona =

Former Colorado River steamboat landing in Yuma County, Arizona

Coordinates: 32.4967°N 114.8077°W

Pedrick's was a steamboat landing owned by John Pedrick that supplied wood to steamboats on the lower Colorado River in Sonora, Mexico, from the mid 1850s to the late 1870s. After the 1854 Gadsden Purchase, Pedrick's was within New Mexico Territory and Arizona Territory after 1863. Pedrick's landing was located 24 miles above Ogden's Landing and 31 miles below Fort Yuma. Pedrick's lay along the east bank of the river just above what is now the Sonora – Arizona border in modern Yuma County, Arizona.

Pedrick's was also a ferry crossing of the Colorado River, also known as Paddock's Old Ferry, before the American Civil War but it had not been operating for some time before the war and the adobe house at the site was in ruins, according to a November 21, 1861 letter from Lieutenant-Colonel J. R. West, Commander of Fort Yuma to Lieut. Benjamin C. Cutler, acting Adjutant General of the military District of Southern California, in Los Angeles.
