= Polhamus Landing, Arizona =

Ghost town in Mohave County, Arizona, US

- Ghost town
- Location within Arizona Location within the United States
- Coordinates: 35°11′32″N 114°34′12″W
- Country: United States
- State: Arizona
- County: Mohave
- Founded: 1881
- Abandoned: 1882
- Elevation: 539 ft (164 m)

Population
  - Total: 0
- Time zone: MST (no DST)

Polhamus Landing, or Welton & Grounds Landing, was a steamboat landing in Mohave County, Arizona, United States during 1881 and 1882.

== History ==
By June 1881, Captain Issac Polhamus, superintendent of the Colorado Steam Navigation Company and two partners, Welton & Grounds, merchants from the booming mining camp of Mineral Park, established a new landing five miles up river from Hardyville. It had a large warehouse and other buildings, on land cut from a hill next to the river. They had also constructed a road from their landing that avoided a bad section of the road from Hardyville to Mineral Park and Cerbat and saved five miles on the route.

Subsequently freighting to Hardyville dropped drastically, while freight landing at Polhamus Landing rose dramatically. Articles of The Arizona Sentinel, mention freight shipments sent to the two rival locations during the next year:

- 9/09/1881 Hardyville 2,794 lbs; Polhamus Landing, 98,619 lbs
- 6/10/1882 Hardyville, 880 lbs; Polhamus Landing, 22,834 lbs

Mention of Polhamus Landing does not occur in The Arizona Sentinel after June 1882, indicating that both landings were supplanted by the just constructed Kingman railhead of the advancing Atlantic and Pacific Railroad that would by May 1883 have advanced to bridge the Colorado River at Eastbridge station, and link up with the Southern Pacific Railroad advancing eastward to meet it at Needles. The Arizona Sentinel of November 17, 1883 announced the firm of Welton & Grounds had been dissolved, becoming Welton & Beecher.
