= Jaeger's Ferry =

Jaeger's Ferry was a major river ferry at the Yuma Crossing of the Colorado River in the 1850s until 1862, 1 mile below Fort Yuma.

== Early history of the site ==
Long a crossing point on the river, from the time of Juan Bautista de Anza it was used by Spaniards and later Mexicans, traveling from Sonora to Alta California and still later by American fur traders. During the California Gold Rush it was a major crossing on the Southern Emigrant Trail, with a ferry being established by A. L. Lincoln who later partnered with the Glanton Gang. After the Glanton Gang started hostilities with the local Quechan by destroying their rival ferry and killing some of them, they were in turn killed. Upon hearing the news of the Glanton Massacre, George Alonzo Johnson with some of his fellow sailors came from San Francisco to rebuild the ferry, building a stockade to protect their camp from the Quechan. The hapless California Militia of the Gila Expedition took shelter from the Quechan in the stockade for a time before straggling back to the west coast.

== Jaeger's Ferry ==
After the Army arrived and built Fort Yuma, the ferry was purchased by L. J. F. Jaeger and his partner from Johnson and his partners. Jaeger developed the ferry that could carry a wagon and team of horses between the California and Arizona shores. Jaeger later built a store and hotel on the north bank, in California, calling it Jaeger City. Across the river he purchased a lot in Colorado City for the price of ferrying its surveying party across the river. In 1858 the ferry became the crossing point of the Butterfield Overland Mail and Jaeger City became the location of its stage station and its local district office. In the Great Flood of 1862, the ferry, Jaeger City and Colorado City were destroyed by the flooding of the Colorado River.
