= Clip, Arizona =

Former steamboat landing in Yuma County, Arizona Territory

Coordinates: 33°11′11″N 114°40′18″W

Clip, or Clip Landing, was a steamboat landing and mill settlement in Yuma County, Arizona Territory. The site in the present day is owned and maintained by the Laccinole Family Living Trust, on the east bank of the Colorado River in La Paz County, Arizona. The settlement was located 70 miles up river from Yuma. It lies at an elevation of 223 feet, just south of Clip Wash, and the road to the Clip Mine at the top of the wash, 8 miles southeast of the mill.

== History ==
The Silver Clip Claim was found in the early 1880s in the Trigo Mountains in what was then the Silver Mining District in Yuma County, Arizona Territory. By 1882, a landing and the mine had been established and the ten stamp Clip Mill was in production, for the mine owners Anthony G. Hubbard and Bowers. The locality had a post office from February 6, 1884, to October 13, 1888. At its height the town had a population of over 200 and besides the landing, mill and post office it had a general store.

The mill was in production from 1882 to 1887. Near the end it was only processing the tailings of the mine, before it was shut down. The town, like many silver mining towns at the time soon followed the mine and mill into oblivion with the fall in silver prices in the late 1880s.
