= Callville, Nevada =

Former settlement in Nevada, United States

Coordinates: 36°06′48″N 114°41′20″W

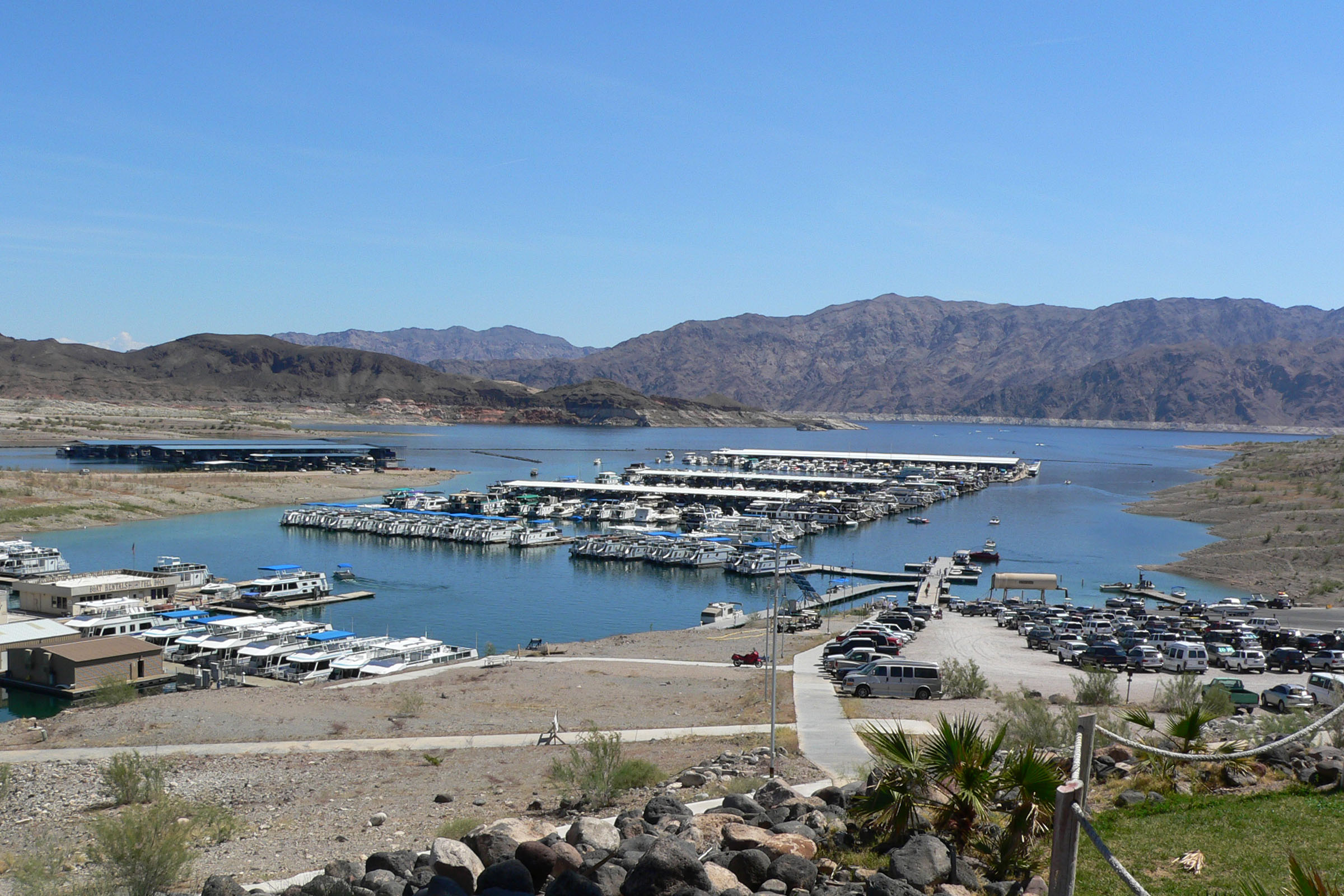
Callville Bay on Lake Mead pictured; Callville was submerged under the lake.

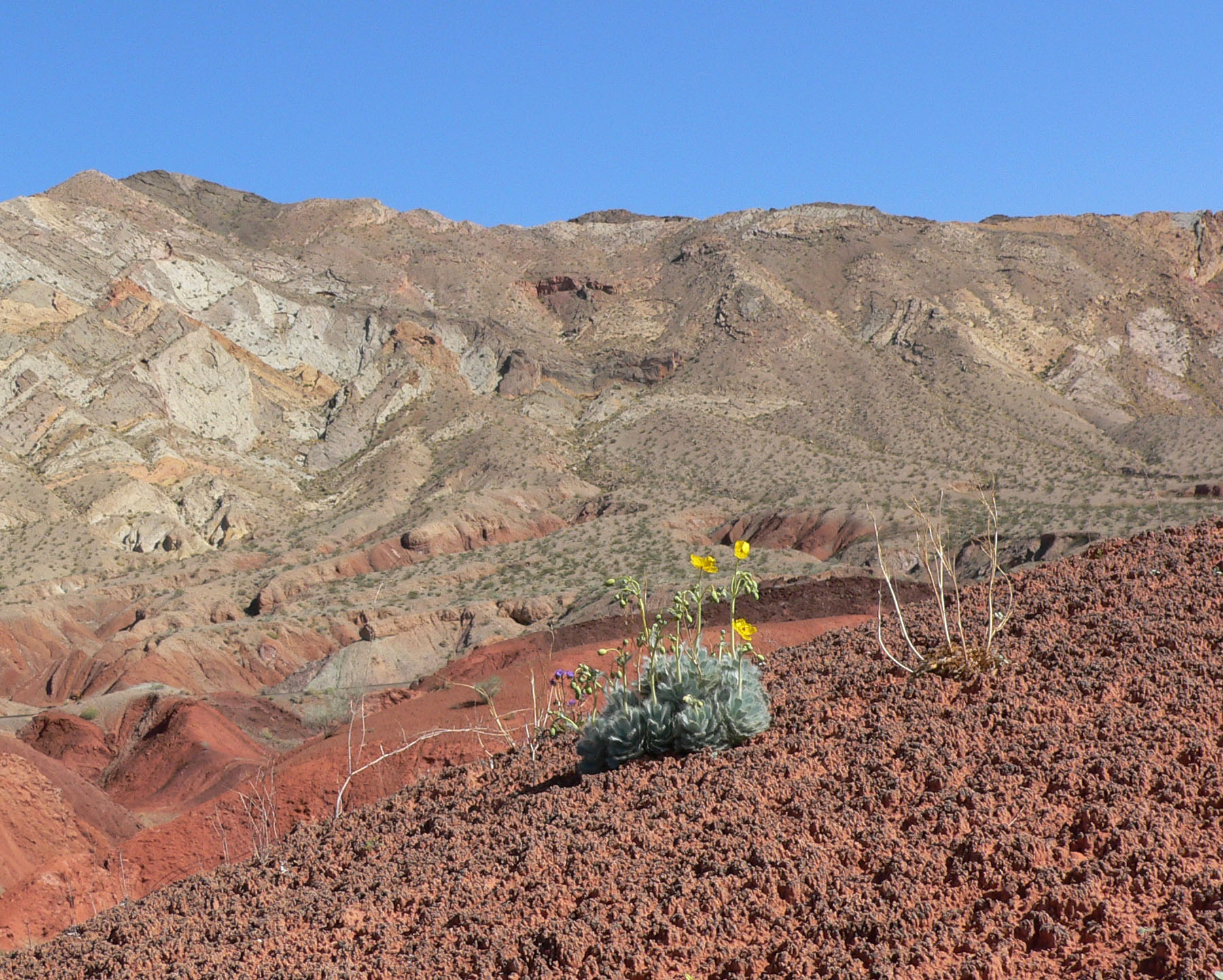
View east of Callville Bay Road

Callville is a former settlement of Clark County in the U.S. state of Nevada. Abandoned in 1869, it was submerged under Lake Mead when the Colorado River was dammed, Callville Bay retaining the name. At one time, it was noted to be the southernmost outpost of the Mormon settlement.

== Geography ==
Located 350 miles (560 km) from Salt Lake City, Callville was situated on the west bank of the Colorado River, in what was at the time Pah-Ute County, Arizona Territory. The main road to the settlement was along the Virgin River close to St. Thomas, Nevada before heading over hills to the west. A road connected Callville with the main highway at Las Vegas.

== History ==
"Take a suitable company, locate a road to the Colorado, explore the river, find a suitable place for a warehouse, build it, and form a settlement at or near the landing." (Brigham Young instructing Anson Call, 1864)

Callville was established on December 2, 1864, by Anson Call, Dr. James M. Whitmore, A. M. Cannon, Jacob Hamblin and son. It was at the time the southernmost outpost of Mormon settlement. The settlement was made by Call "as agent for the Trustee in Trust (the President) of the Church in December, 1864, according to a plan which was conceived of at that time to bring the Church immigration from Europe to Utah via Panama, the Gulf of California and up the river to this landing." A number of Salt Lake City merchants worked in conjunction with the plan to build a warehouse on the Colorado River for goods portage. On November 1, 1864, Call was directed to put together a suitable company, find a road to the Colorado River, explore it, locate a suitable locale for a warehouse, build it, and create a settlement by the landing. In order to accomplish this, in St. George, he employed Hamblin and son, Cannon and Whitmore. Their travels included leaving the mouth of the Muddy River, traveling down the Virgin River for 12 miles (19 km), continuing through Echo Wash for 12 miles (19 km), before heading southwestward for 20 miles (32 km) to the Colorado River, a mile below the mouth of the narrows of Boulder Canyon and above the mouth of Black Canyon, where they located a black rocky point, which was considered a suitable spot for the construction of a warehouse, above high-water mark. It was located just below the confluence of Callville Wash with the Colorado River.

Callville was one of seven Mormon settlements on or near the Muddy River, the others being St. Thomas, Saint Joseph, Overton, West Point, Mill Point later Simonsville and Rioville on the Colorado River above its confluence with the Virgin River. Callville became the county seat of Pah-Ute County, Arizona Territory, in December 1865, before the seat was moved on October 1, 1867, to St. Thomas.

During the American Civil War in the 1860s, it was used as a garrison by the Army and as a landing point for Colorado River steamboats. The military shut down the garrison at Callville in 1869. A year after the American Civil War ended, steamboats began to travel on the Colorado River from the Gulf of California to Callville. But immediately thereafter, Congress realigned the states of Arizona and Nevada, which incorporated Callville into the state of Nevada. From 1867 to 69, Octavius Decatur Gass was Callville's postmaster; but by 1869, the port of Callville was deemed to be too far up the Colorado for steamboat navigation. The Deseret News noted that the port of Callville was abandoned in June of that year. The news story was in connection with the escape of horse thieves who used four large doors from the abandoned settlement's warehouse as a raft. The storehouse was still noted as standing in 1892.

Later in 1921, a large deposit of colemanite was discovered near Callville Wash.

Callville was submerged under 400 feet (120 m) of water after the Colorado River was dammed to form Lake Mead. Callville Bay recreation area is located at the site.

== See also ==
- List of ghost towns in Nevada

== Bibliography ==
- Glass, Mary Ellen (1 January 1983). Touring Nevada: A Historic and Scenic Guide. University of Nevada Press. ISBN 978-0-87417-074-0.
- Longwell, Chester Ray (1928). Geology of the Muddy Mountains, Nevada: With a Section Through the Virgin Range to the Grand Wash Cliffs, Arizona. U.S. Government Printing Office.
- McClintock, James H. (1921). Mormon Settlement in Arizona; a Record of Peaceful Conquest of the Desert (Public domain ed.). McClintock. ISBN 9780404084394.
- Moreno, Richard (1998). The Historical Nevada Magazine: Outstanding Historical Features from the Pages of Nevada Magazine. University of Nevada Press. ISBN 978-1-890136-06-2.
- Smith, Scott (31 May 2011). Moon Nevada. Avalon Travel. ISBN 978-1-59880-943-5.
- Stein, Mark (7 April 2009). How the States Got Their Shapes. HarperCollins. ISBN 978-0-06-189986-7.
- Tingley, Joseph V.; Purkey, Becky W.; Duebendorfer, Ernest M. (August 2008). SP016: Geologic tours in the Las Vegas area: Expanded edition with GPS coordinates. Eugene I. Smith, Jonathan G. Price, & Stephen B. Castor. NV Bureau of Mines & Geology. ISBN 978-1-888035-12-4.
- Wagoner, Jay J. (1970). Arizona Territory 1863-1912: A Political history. Tucson: University of Arizona Press. ISBN 0-8165-0176-9.
