= Mojave City, Arizona =

Mohave City, Arizona
- Ghost town
- Location within Arizona Location within the United States
- Coordinates: 35°02′24″N 114°37′23″W
- Country: United States
- State: Arizona
- County: Mohave
- Founded: 1863
- Abandoned: 1938
- Elevation: 502 ft (153 m)

Population (2009)
  - Total: 0
- Time zone: MST (no DST)
- Post Office opened: October 8, 1866
- Post Office closed: October 31, 1938
- GNIS feature ID: 25308

Mohave City (also spelled as Mojave City) is a ghost town in Mohave County in the northwestern part of the U.S. state of Arizona. Settled in the 1860s, in what was then the Arizona Territory, it was founded as a river landing and trading center for area miners and soldiers, and was named for Mohave County.

== History ==
=== Mohave City ===
Indian threats to miners on the southern portion of the Colorado River spurred the creation of Fort Mohave by the Army, at the present day location of the Fort Mojave Indian Reservation. The relative safety provided by the military presence led to the founding of Mohave City in 1863 by California Volunteers troops stationed at the nearby fort 5 miles down river.

Mohave City served primarily as a recreation town and its saloons and brothels thrived, thanks to the ample supply of miners and soldiers. By 1866, the town had grown large enough to become the county seat, and a post office was established on October 8, 1866.

Unlike most ghost towns in Arizona, which were abandoned due to the local mine running out, Mohave City was short-lived for a different reason. Fort Mohave expanded its borders to include the town site in 1869, mostly to get rid of it. In the fall of 1869, the military demanded that all civilians leave within 30 days, and proceeded to absorb the town's land. Many residents packed up their homes and businesses, and moved on to new locations but others remained as did the post office.

=== Hardyville ===
The steamboat landing and freighting town of Hardyville (now within the limits of Bullhead City), created in 1864, 5 miles north of Mohave City, gained in prominence over Mohave City when it became the Colorado River ferry crossing of the road between Los Angeles and Prescott and a major steamboat landing for the George A. Johnson & Company, closer to the local San Francisco Mining District mines than Mohave City. On January 21, 1867, Hardyville took over the title of county seat.

Historical population
Census	Pop.	Note	%±
1870	159		—
1900	30		—
1910	175		483.3%

=== Fort Mohave−Mohave City ===
After the assumption of the land by the military, the town was referred to interchangeably as Fort Mohave or Mohave City. The town clearly continued in some capacity, as it was listed as having 159 residents in the 1870 US Census. By the 1880s, the town still housed approximately 50 residents, as well as a post office, gunsmith, a blacksmith, a pharmacist, and a general store.

In 1890, the government gave the Fort Mohave land to the Indian Service by order of President Benjamin Harrison. Shortly thereafter, the buildings came to be used as a school for the local Indian population, housing as many as 200 students. The school closed and the buildings were given up by the Indian Service in 1935, and on October 31, 1938, the post office was discontinued. From that point onward, the land has been part of the Fort Mojave Indian Reservation.

== Remnants ==
Today, nothing remains of the fort, or the original buildings of Mohave City.

== Geography ==
Mohave City was located at approximately 35°02′24″N 114°37′23″W (35.0444453, -114.6230214) on the bank of the Colorado River, 10 miles (16 km) south of Bullhead City.

== See also ==
- Fort Mohave, Arizona
- Mojave people
- List of ghost towns in Arizona
- Arizona Territory
