= Colorado City, Yuma County, Arizona =

Ghost town in the United States

Coordinates: 32°43′47″N 114°37′48″W

Colorado City is a ghost town in what is now Yuma County, Arizona. It was located on the south bank of the Colorado River at Jaeger's Ferry, 1 mile down river from Fort Yuma.

Colorado City was a land speculation, surveyed to pay for a ferry crossing fee at Jaeger's Ferry and later sold in San Francisco by Charles Poston in 1854. It became the site of the U. S. custom house, sprang up on the south side of the Colorado River in what is now Arizona, but at that time was just north of the border between Sonora, Mexico and California. After the Gadsden Purchase it bordered on the Territory of New Mexico, that became the Territory of Arizona in 1863. The Colorado City site at the time was duly registered in San Diego, demonstrating that both banks of the Colorado River just below its confluence with the Gila were recognized as being within the jurisdiction of California. The county of San Diego collected taxes from there for many years.

It was destroyed, along with Jaeger City across the river, in the Great Flood of 1862, it was rebuilt on higher ground and became part of Arizona City, later renamed Yuma, Arizona, in 1873.

== See also ==
- List of ghost towns in Arizona
