= Robinson's Landing =

Robinson's Landing was a location in Baja California, Mexico. It lay on the west bank of the Colorado River northwest of the north tip of Montague Island in the Colorado River Delta, 10 miles above the mouth of the river on the Gulf of California. Named for David C. Robinson, it was the place where cargo was unloaded in the river from seagoing craft on to flatbottomed steamboats and carried up to Fort Yuma and points further north on the river from 1852 onward. Joseph C. Ives, described it as it was in 1858, in his 1861 Report upon the Colorado river of the West The river here was subject to a severe tidal bore that formed in the estuary about Montague Island and propagated upstream and could on occasion swamp barges, boats and ships. By 1865, a better location was found, ships offloaded their cargos on the east bank of the river at Port Isabel, Sonora, northeast of Montague Island. 17 miles from Robinson's landing and 57 miles below Port Famine.

== See also ==
- Steamboats of the Colorado River
