= Explorer (sternwheeler) =

Stern-wheel steamboat built 1858

Explorer was a small, custom-made stern-wheel steamboat built for Second lieutenant Joseph Christmas Ives and used by him to carry the U. S. Army Corps of Topographical Engineers expedition to explore the Colorado River above Fort Yuma in 1858.

== History ==
After inquiring about the cost of chartering one of the Colorado River steamboats of George Alonzo Johnson and finding their rates too high, Lt. Ives ordered a steamboat built in 1857:

"In the latter part of June I ordered of Reaney, Neafie & Co., of Philadelphia, an iron steamer, fifty feet long, to be built in sections, and the parts to be so arranged that they could be transported by railroad, as the shortness of time required that it should be sent to California, via the Isthmus of Panama. About the middle of August the boat was finished, tried upon the Delaware, and found satisfactory, subject to a few alterations only. It was then taken apart, sent to New York, and shipped on board of the California steamer which sailed on the 20th of August for Aspinwall. Mr. A. J. Carroll, of Philadelphia, who had engaged to accompany the expedition as steamboat engineer, went out in charge of the boat."

After being transported by the Panama Railroad across the Isthmus to the Pacific Ocean, the Explorer was shipped again by steamship from Panama City up to San Francisco. From there expedition sailed with the parts of the steamboat on the deck of the schooner Monterey to the Colorado River Delta where it arrived November 30. There Ives oversaw its reassembly and launch on December 30, 1857, at Robinson's Landing, Baja California. David C. Robinson, owner of the landing and a pilot for George Alonzo Johnson, was made captain of the boat.

After Ives used the Explorer to ascend the Colorado River, he sent it back to Fort Yuma with Richardson. There it was put up for auction and sold to George A. Johnson for $1000. He had its engine and paddle wheel removed and used it for a barge to carry firewood to steamboat landings. In 1864 it broke free from it moorings at Pilot Knob and was carried away 60 miles down river into the Delta where it sank in a slough, sometimes seen by passing steamers, until the river moved away from the location and it was hidden by the delta foliage and lost. Its wreck was found in 1929, by a survey party, in a dried up slough miles away from the new course of the river. A mere skeleton remained, its iron plates long ago removed to make comales for baking tortillas.
