= Arizona City (Yuma, Arizona) =

Historic settlement

Coordinates: 32°41′32″N 114°36′55″W

Arizona City or Arizona is the name of the original settlement at the Yuma Crossing, in what is now Yuma, Arizona, United States.

From 1853 a small settlement, Arizona City, grew up on the high ground across from Fort Yuma, first as the adobe residence of Mrs. Bowman the fort's mess cook. This was purchased for use as a store the next year by George F. Hooper. On the mail route with the arrival of the San Antonio-San Diego Mail Line in 1857, and the Butterfield Overland Mail in 1858, the town received its post office of Arizona with its first postmaster John Blake Dow March 17, 1858. At that time it consisted of adobe dwellings, two stores and two saloons.

Originally part of Doña Ana County, New Mexico Territory, on February 1, 1860, Arizona City became part of Arizona County, New Mexico Territory. Arizona County comprised all the land of the Gadsden Purchase west of a line close to the current New Mexico – Arizona border, with its seat at Tubac, later Tucson from July 8, 1861.

Arizona City was damaged and downriver rivals Colorado City and Jaeger City were destroyed by the Great Flood of 1862. Colorado City was rebuilt on higher ground and became part of Arizona City. Jaeger City was abandoned, its remaining inhabitants and the ferry moved upriver to become part of Arizona City. With the end of the Butterfield route through New Mexico Territory in March 1861, and Apache hostilities, mail ceased to be delivered except by military courier and the Arizona post office was discontinued June 8, 1863. Its second and last postmaster from July 7, 1858, Landsford Warren Hastings, later in the American Civil War proposed a plan (never carried out) for the Confederacy to recapture Arizona as part of a campaign to cause a rising of Southerners in California to take California from the Union. Hastings, after the Civil War, attempted to colonize Brazil with former Confederates.

The town post office was restored with the return of mail service on October 1, 1866, but with the name of Yuma. On October 28, 1869, it was renamed Arizona City. By 1870, the population of Arizona City had risen to 1,144. In 1871, it became the county seat of Yuma County, replacing La Paz. Finally both the post office and city took the name Yuma on April 14, 1873.

== Demographics ==
Historical population
Census	Pop.	Note	%±
1860	130		—
1870	1,144		780.0%
U.S. Decennial Census

Arizona City first appeared on the 1860 U.S. Census in what was then Arizona County, New Mexico Territory (which encompassed virtually the entirety of the soon-to-be new Arizona Territory). It was erroneously reported as the village of "Arizonia" and featured 130 residents. The cumulative total erroneously showed 128 White residents, 1 Black resident and 1 Native American resident. The transcribed rolls noted 127 Whites and one Asian, a 26-year old Chinese cook named William T. Ching, accidentally counted as White. At the time, it was the 5th largest White settlement (and 16th overall, including native villages) in Arizona County (tied with Fort Mojave). It reported again in 1870, with 1,144 residents (1,121 White; 15 Native American; 7 Asian & 1 Black). It became the second largest community in Arizona Territory after Tucson (although the census-takers failed to report any native villages in that census, unlike in 1860).

On March 11, 1871, Arizona City was officially incorporated by an act of the Territorial legislature, the same year it gained the county seat from La Paz. Its name was officially changed to Yuma in 1873.
