= Joseph Christmas Ives =

American explorer and botanist (1828–1868)

- Born: December 25, 1829; New York City, U.S.
- Died: November 12, 1868 (aged 38); New York City, U.S.
- Spouse: Cora Semmes Ives
- Children: Eugene S. Ives
- Military career
- Allegiance: United States of America; Confederate States of America
- Branch: United States Army; Confederate States Army
- Service years: 1852–1861 (USA); 1861–1865 (CSA)
- Rank: First Lieutenant (USA); Colonel (CSA)
- Unit: Topographical Engineers
- Conflicts: American Civil War
- Other work: Botanist, explorer

Joseph Christmas Ives (25 December 1829 – 12 November 1868) was an American soldier, botanist, and an explorer of the Colorado River in 1858.

== Biography ==
Ives was born in New York City on Christmas Day, 1829. He graduated from Bowdoin College in 1848 and received his M.A. in 1851. At Bowdoin, he was a member of the Athenaean Society. He was a graduate of the United States Military Academy at West Point, New York, in 1852. From 1853 to 1854, Ives served as a Second lieutenant in the U.S. Army's Topographical Engineers and assisted Lt. Amiel Weeks Whipple in the Pacific Railroad survey along the 35th parallel.

From 1857 to 1858, Ives commanded an expedition to explore up the Colorado River from its mouth. He designed, built and tested his own stern-wheel steamboat, then shipped it to the Colorado River Delta. At Robinson's Landing, he reassembled then used the 54-foot steamboat Explorer to map and survey the river. His party included Smithsonian associate John Strong Newberry as geologist and German artist Balduin Möllhausen. He led his party up the Colorado to a point just above the head of Black Canyon of the Colorado and beyond to the vicinity of Fortification Rock. Next day, they went two miles farther to Las Vegas Wash, which Ives thought might be the Virgin River, but had doubts because it seemed too small. The difficulties of the rapids above Fortification Rock convinced Ives that the river at Fortification Rock was the practical head of navigation 550 miles above the mouth of the river:

I now determined not to try to ascend the Colorado any further. The water above the Black canon had been shoal, and the current swift. Rapids had occurred in such quick succession as to make navigation almost impossible, and there would be no object in proceeding beyond the Great Bend. The difficulties encountered in the canon were of a character to prevent a steamboat from attempting to traverse it at low water, and we had seen drift-wood lodged in clefts fifty feet above the river, betokening a condition of things during the summer freshet that would render navigation more hazardous at that season than now. It appeared, therefore, that the foot of the Black canon should be considered the practical head of navigation, and I concluded to have a reconnaissance made to connect that point with the Mormon road, and to let this finish the exploration of the navigable portion of the Colorado.

Returning to the Mohave Villages, he then struck out across northern Arizona to Fort Defiance. Ives reported his findings in his 1861 Report upon the Colorado river of the West The Ives expedition produced one of the important early maps of the Grand Canyon drawn by Frederick W. von Egloffstein, topographer to the expedition.

Ives next served as engineer and architect for the Washington Monument from 1859 to 1860. At the beginning of American Civil War, he declined a promotion to captain and, despite his Northern birth, he joined the Confederate Army in late 1861. He served in several engineering capacities, and was finally appointed aide-de-camp (with rank of colonel) to President Jefferson Davis from 1863 to 1865. After the war, he settled in New York City where he died November 12, 1868.

In 1855, he married Cora Semmes Ives. New York State Senator and Arizona Territorial Council President Eugene S. Ives (1859–1917) was their son.
