= Black Canyon of the Colorado =

Canyon on the Colorado River where Hoover Dam was built

Black Canyon
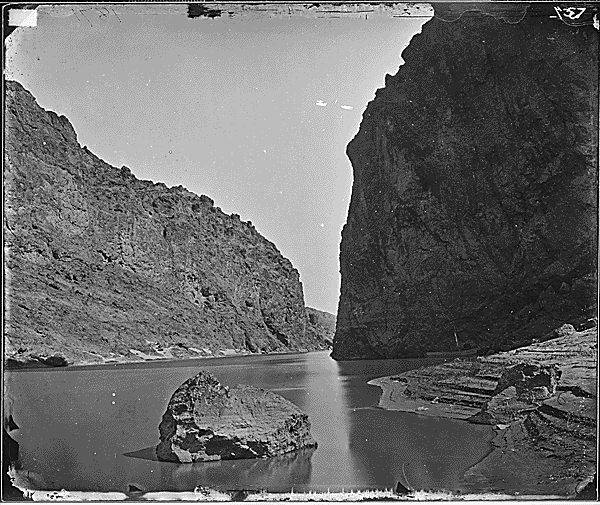
- Black Canyon, photographed in 1871

- Location within Arizona

Geography
- Coordinates: 35°48′20″N 114°42′42″W
- Interactive map of Black Canyon

The Black Canyon of the Colorado is the canyon on the Colorado River where Hoover Dam was built. The canyon is located on the Colorado River at the state line between Nevada and Arizona. The western wall of the gorge is in the El Dorado Mountains, and the eastern wall is in the Black Mountains of Arizona. The canyon formed about 15 million years ago during the Miocene Basin and Range uplift. Black Canyon gets its name from the black volcanic rocks that are found throughout the area.

Just south of the Hoover Dam on the Nevada side of the canyon is the Sauna Cave. This cave was drilled by miners working on Hoover Dam while it was being constructed. It is a deep cave with calcium carbonate crystals on the walls. At the end of the cave is a hot spring, which causes temperatures in the cave to reach 120 °F (49 °C).

One prominent canyon that splits from this canyon south of the Hoover Dam is Boy Scout Canyon. Boy Scout Canyon has water running through it that is warmed from a geothermal source.

On the Arizona side of the river, there are several large hot springs that can be found by taking a trail north from a larger bay about 4 to 5 miles (6.4 to 8.0 km) south of the Hoover Dam.

The Colorado River traveling through the Black Canyon is designated as the Black Canyon Water Trail, a National Water Trail.
