= Sallie Fox =

American pioneer (1845–1913)

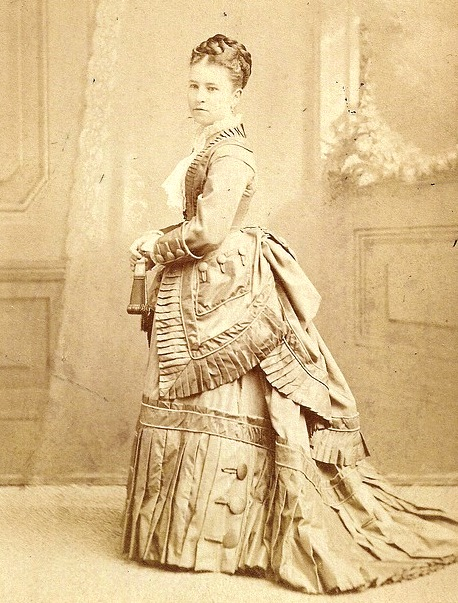
- Sallie Fox in her wedding dress, 1873
- Born: Sarah Estelle Fox; 1845; Southeastern Ohio
- Died: 7 February 1913; Napa, California
- Other name: Sarah Fox Allen
- Known for: American pioneer
- Spouse: Oliver Perry Allen

Sarah Estelle Fox Allen (1845 – 7 February 1913) was a California pioneer and a member of the ill-fated Rose–Baley Party, the first emigrant wagon train to attempt the journey from New Mexico to California via Beale's Wagon Road. A twelve-year-old child when she traveled on the wagon train, she was the subject of the 1995 children's book Sallie Fox: The Story of a Pioneer Girl. The apron that she wore over her dress when she was seriously injured by a Mojave Indian arrow during the 1858 attack on the Rose–Baley wagons is displayed in the Vacaville Museum which also holds an annual "Sallie Fox Day".

== Early life ==
Sallie Fox was born in 1845, the second daughter of Aaron Moses and Mary (née Baldwin) Fox. Her father, a farmer in Southeastern Ohio, died when she was an infant. Mary subsequently moved with their two young daughters, Sallie and Sophia Frances, to Van Buren County, Iowa where her family were living. There, the "Widow Fox", as she was known, married Alpha Brown, himself recently widowed with two daughters, one of whom was an invalid. Mary and Alpha Brown had two more children of their own, a daughter Julia and a son Orrin. In 1858, the Brown's neighbor Leonard Rose, a wealthy businessman, formed an emigrant party to travel to California. As Rose later wrote:

... some miners who had just returned from California, so fired my imagination with descriptions of its glorious climate, wealth of flowers and luscious fruits, that I was inspired with an irresistible desire to experience in person the delights to be found in the land of plenty.

The Brown family were also attracted to a new life in California and decided to join Rose. Mary's brother George and her married sisters were already living there. Alpha Brown was taken on as the foreman of Rose's wagon train, and he, Mary, and the five Fox-Brown children (Sallie and Sophia Fox and Relief, Julia, and Orrin Brown) began their trek west in late April 1858. (Note: Alpha Brown's eldest daughter, Mary Ann, was 21 at the time and did not make the trip.) Sallie Fox was 12 years old at the time.

== The Rose–Baley Party and its aftermath ==
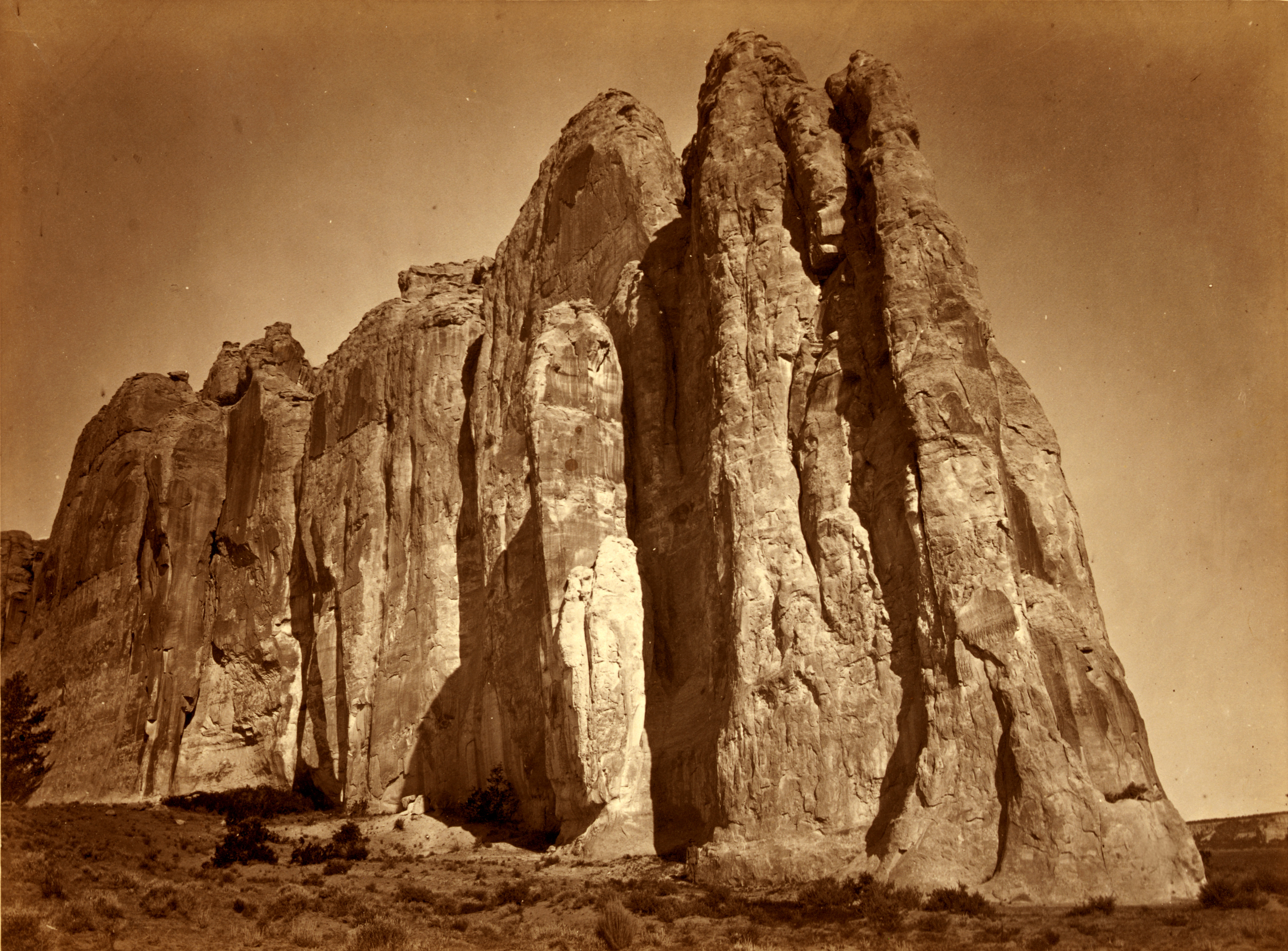
Inscription Rock in New Mexico where Sallie Fox carved her name on 8 July 1858

In mid-May, while resting at Cottonwood Creek, near present-day Durham, Kansas, the Rose wagon train was joined by a party led by Gillum Baley, which had left Missouri in April and also intended to travel to California via the Santa Fe Trail. The two parties merged, and by June they had reached Albuquerque, New Mexico, without incident. There, they decided to attempt the final stretch to California via Beale's Wagon Road, at the time little more than a rough trail. Beale's route crossed the Colorado River into California farther north than the established crossing at Fort Yuma and had the potential to shorten the journey considerably. In July, the party camped near Inscription Rock (now El Morro National Monument) in New Mexico. Several members of the party, including Leonard Rose, John Udell, and Sallie Fox carved their names into the stone. Although now greatly eroded, their inscriptions can still be seen today. On reaching Zuni Pueblo The Rose–Baley Party headed onto Beale's Wagon Road.

As the emigrants were preparing to cross the Colorado River into California on 30 August, they were attacked by Mohave Indians. Sallie Fox had seen some of them approaching and screamed: "The Indians are coming and are going to kill us!". Her screams, followed by the Mojave war cries and then gunshot, immediately brought Alpha Brown and the other cattle herders who had been further up the trail. Mary Brown put a feather bed against their wagon box, placed the children behind it, and covered them with blankets. In the ensuing battle, Alpha Brown was killed and Sallie was severely wounded when an arrow went through the wagon box and pierced her side. The Mohave were eventually fought off, leaving twelve emigrants badly wounded and eight dead, including five children from another family. Alpha Brown's body was wrapped in a blanket, weighted with chains, and committed to the Colorado River. Having lost most of their livestock and fearful of further attacks, the surviving members of the party had to abandon all but two of their wagons and trek the 500 miles back through the desert to Albuquerque. Apart from the wounded, most of the survivors were on foot.

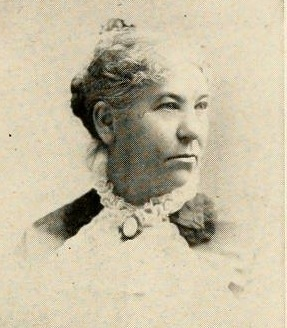
Sallie Fox's mother Mary in her later years. She died in 1899 at the age of 75.

Sallie Fox later wrote of the journey back to Albuquerque:

All that my suddenly bereaved mother took for herself and five children she put into a flour sack, and we literally had to go to bed when our clothes were washed. Mother cut the skirts of our one dress apiece very short so as to make us each bonnets out of the extra length. We slowly wended our way back towards civilization, fearful every moment of another attack from the dreaded Indians, and suffering from the distressing heat and lack of water and food. My invalid sister and I hourly expected to die, so weak and feeble was she, and I, too, from my wound.

Despite the extreme hardship and deprivation of the journey, most of the remaining Rose–Baley Party made it back to Albuquerque. They were aided by two west-bound wagon trains which they encountered at White Springs, just east of what is now Kingman, Arizona. One of these wagon trains was led by Edward O. Smith who would later bring Mary Brown and her surviving children to California. On hearing their story, the wagon trains shared their provisions with the survivors and turned back to accompany them to Albuquerque. In later life, Mary Brown recalled that "to keep from going crazy" on the trek back, she would unravel a stocking and re-knit it over and over again. She had carried her youngest child, Orrin, on the family's only surviving horse. When the horse died, she walked, carrying him in her arms until Edward Smith provided them with a wagon from his own train. Orrin became ill and died shortly before their arrival in Albuquerque in November 1858. He was buried in an unmarked grave outside the town. Sallie's half-sister Julia wrote in 1881: (Note: Julia Brown's memoir was published in The Californian under the pseudonym "Kate Heath". See Baley p. 193, n. 4.)

We stood around it [the grave], watering it with tears, and we knew, having once left it, we never should see it again. We gathered stones and put upon it, to prevent the digging of wolves; and then, having done all, we looked at each other, dreading to go. We had grown stoical with starvation and danger, and we had each a knowledge of death from having stared him in the face so often; but, as my mother turned, in the wagon, to look her last upon the lonely hillside, an agonized cry broke from the lips she had forced shut: "Oh, my boy, my boy! How can I leave him there?"

In Albuquerque, Alpha Brown's fellow Freemasons looked after his destitute family and found them lodging. Sallie Fox's wound eventually healed, but not before she passed through a dangerous period of high fever and delirium. In January 1859, Edward Smith and his brother assembled a wagon train from what was left of their livestock and set out again for California, taking Mary Brown and her four remaining children with them. This time they took the Southern Trail along the Gila River.

== Life in California ==
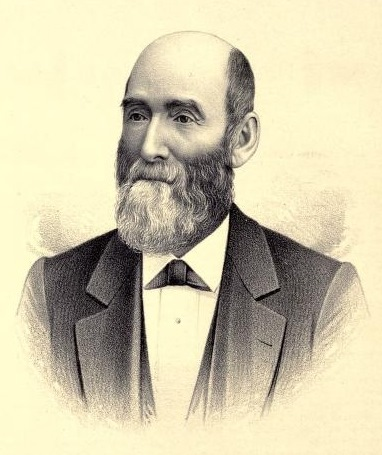
Edward O. Smith, who brought Sallie Fox and her family to California. As she had promised in 1858, she named her first son after him.

Edward O. Smith's party crossed into California at Fort Yuma, where the local merchants provided new clothes for Sallie and her sisters free of charge. The party then set off for Los Angeles, arriving there in the Spring of 1859. Mary Brown and her children had become the first members of the original Rose-Baley party to finally reach California. Mary's brother George Baldwin met them in Los Angeles and took them to Vacaville where they stayed for a while with Mary's sister Julia and her husband Josiah Allison. Sallie's older sister Sophia Fox remained with the Allisons, while Sallie went to Placerville to live with her mother's other sister Lavinia and her husband Darwin De Golia. Mary Brown, along with Julia and Relief Brown, also went to Placerville where she kept house for her brother George and eventually married for the third time to Judge James Johnson.

As a young woman, Sallie Fox worked as a teacher, at first in various elementary schools in the California Gold Country. In the late 1860s, the De Golia family moved to San Francisco, where her uncle Darwin went on to become a prominent attorney. Sallie Fox went with them and received her State Educational Diploma in 1869. She began teaching at the Union Grammar School in San Francisco that same year, supplementing her teaching salary by hand-coloring photographs and selling her oil paintings. In 1870, she visited her childhood home in Keosauqua, Iowa, taking with her the dress she had worn during the Indian attack which still had the hole made by the Mohave arrow. According to one account, when she showed the dress to a group of Iowa schoolchildren and told them its story, one boy asked her if she had survived being shot by the arrow.

After her return to California, she became engaged to Oliver Perry Allen. He had been a naval officer and veteran of the Mexican–American War who later went into banking. They married in San Francisco on 17 August 1873 and had three children, a son Edward whom she named after Edward O. Smith, a daughter Edith, and a second daughter Julia who died in infancy. Sallie's husband, who was ten years her senior, died in 1901 at the age of 68. At the time of his death, Oliver Allen was a bookkeeping officer at the Anglo California National Bank where he had worked for over 30 years.

In 1913, Sarah Fox Allen (as Sallie Fox was known in later life) died at the age of 67 in a Masonic nursing home in Napa, California. Her funeral service was held at the family home in Oakland. Her half-sister Julia Brown Foster died in 1927 at her home in Berkeley. According to Charles Baley in Disaster at the Colorado, Julia is believed to have been the last surviving member of the Rose–Baley Party.

== Legacy ==
Sallie Fox was the subject of the 1995 children's book Sallie Fox: The Story of a Pioneer Girl by Dorothy Kupcha Leland. A slightly fictionalized account of her family's trek to California, the book is among the California Department of Education's recommended resources for elementary school children. When Sallie had first arrived at her aunt and uncle's ranch in Vacaville, she planted four walnuts that she had gathered along the Gila River while traveling with Edward Smith's wagon train. One of them grew into a huge tree, which became a local landmark and gave its name to Vacaville's Nut Tree Restaurant, Nut Tree Airport, and Nut Tree Railroad. Although the tree was destroyed by a storm in 1952, other trees grown from the walnuts it produced remain on the site. The dress she wore when she was injured by the Mohave Indian arrow is displayed in the Vacaville Museum, which also holds an annual "Sallie Fox Day".

Much of the published information about Sallie Fox's life is based on the papers of her daughter Edith Allen Milner, who collected and transcribed her mother's reminiscences. Milner's manuscripts and a copy of Sallie Fox's description of her family's journey to California, which she read out at Edward O. Smith's funeral in 1892, are held in the library of the California Historical Society. Another unpublished manuscript by Milner, "Covered Wagon Experiences", is held by the Arizona Historical Society. Joseph Warren Cheney's "The Story of An Emigrant Train", published in The Annals of Iowa in 1915 also contains descriptions of Alpha Brown's family, the Rose–Baley wagon train, and its aftermath, as does John Udell's diary, published in 1859 and republished in 1946.
