= John Udell =

American farmer and Baptist lay preacher (1795–1874)

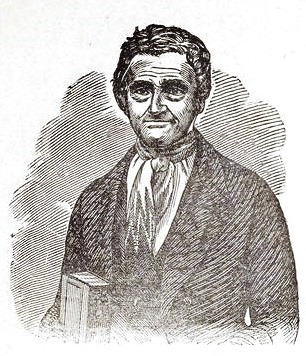
- Udell's portrait from his 1856 diary, Incidents of Travel to California Across the Great Plains
- Born: 22 June 1795; New York City
- Died: 30 June 1874 (aged 79)
- Resting place: Paskenta, California
- Known for: Diarist of the American Frontier

John Udell (22 June 1795 – 30 June 1874) was an American farmer and Baptist lay preacher who is primarily known for two detailed diaries he kept of his travels to California across the Great Plains of the United States. He traversed the overland route four times between 1850 and 1859, returning by sea on his first three trips. After his fourth and final trip to California he remained there, settling in Solano County and later in Sonoma County. His first diary, Incidents of Travel to California Across the Great Plains, was published in 1856. His second diary, Journal of John Udell, Kept During a Trip Across the Plains, was first published in 1859 and is an account of his last trip to California as a member of the Rose-Baley Party.

== Early years and marriage ==
Modern accounts of John Udell's early life are based on his autobiographical sketch published in 1856 as part of Incidents of Travel to California Across the Great Plains and summarized in Lyle H. Wright's introduction to the 1946 edition of Udell's second diary, Journal of John Udell, Kept During a Trip Across the Plains.

Born in New York City, he was the eldest of Phebe (née Bailey) and John Udell's 13 children. According to Udell, his great-grandfather Lionel had been a physician and innkeeper in Exeter, England. He emigrated to the United States in the late 17th century, settling in Stonington, Connecticut where he continued to practice as a physician. Udell's grandfather (also named John) had a shipping business in Stephentown, New York, but after his death, his business partners "absconded" with the company's cash, leaving large debts to be paid by Udell's father. For a while his father, who had previously worked as a merchant seaman out of New York, ran a sloop on the Hudson River belonging to the Schermerhorn family. The young John Udell served as the cook and cabin-boy.

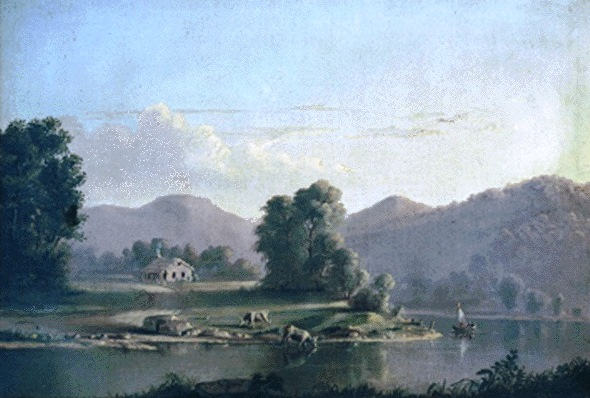
19th-century depiction of Ashtabula County, Ohio where John and Emily Udell spent much of their married life

In 1810, Udell's father moved the family to the wilderness of northeastern Pennsylvania where he took up farming. It was in Pennsylvania that Udell became a Baptist. He would remain a devout member of the faith until his death, preaching to small gatherings and once marrying a couple on one of his westward wagon trains. However, according to Lyle Wright, there is no evidence that he was ever formally trained or ordained as a minister. The Udell family found it difficult to make a living from the farm in Pennsylvania and in early 1816, John Udell travelled to Ohio to seek a new home for his parents, eventually settling the family in New Lyme. There he married Emily Merrill in December 1816. She was born in Connecticut, as were most of the early settlers of the town.

In the ensuing years, Udell and his wife moved many times as he tried his hand at farming and business in a variety of locations in Ohio and Missouri. He had a large family to support. He and Emily eventually had four sons and four daughters, and he often supplemented his income by working as a travelling salesman or as a day-laborer for other farmers. In 1819 on the advice of a neighbor, he even took up distilling whiskey from his surplus grain. He then ran his own stills for another three years but later wrote of his decision to enter the distillery business:

I consented to do so; which was a great error in me; though at that time, making and using whiskey, as a common drink, was very popular thro'out the United States. But now I think that making and vending so much to intoxicate men was wrong, and especially reprehensible in a Christian.

Even before his transcontinental journeys, Udell had been an inveterate traveller. In 1818, shortly after the birth of his first child, he walked 500 miles from Ohio to upstate New York in search of higher-paid work, travelling via Niagara Falls, Lake Ontario, the Genesee Falls, and Canandaigua Lake. The trip proved unsuccessful. According to Udell, he had to sell his clothes at Canandaigua to buy enough food for his return journey to Ohio which he walked at a pace of 40 miles a day.

== Travels to California ==
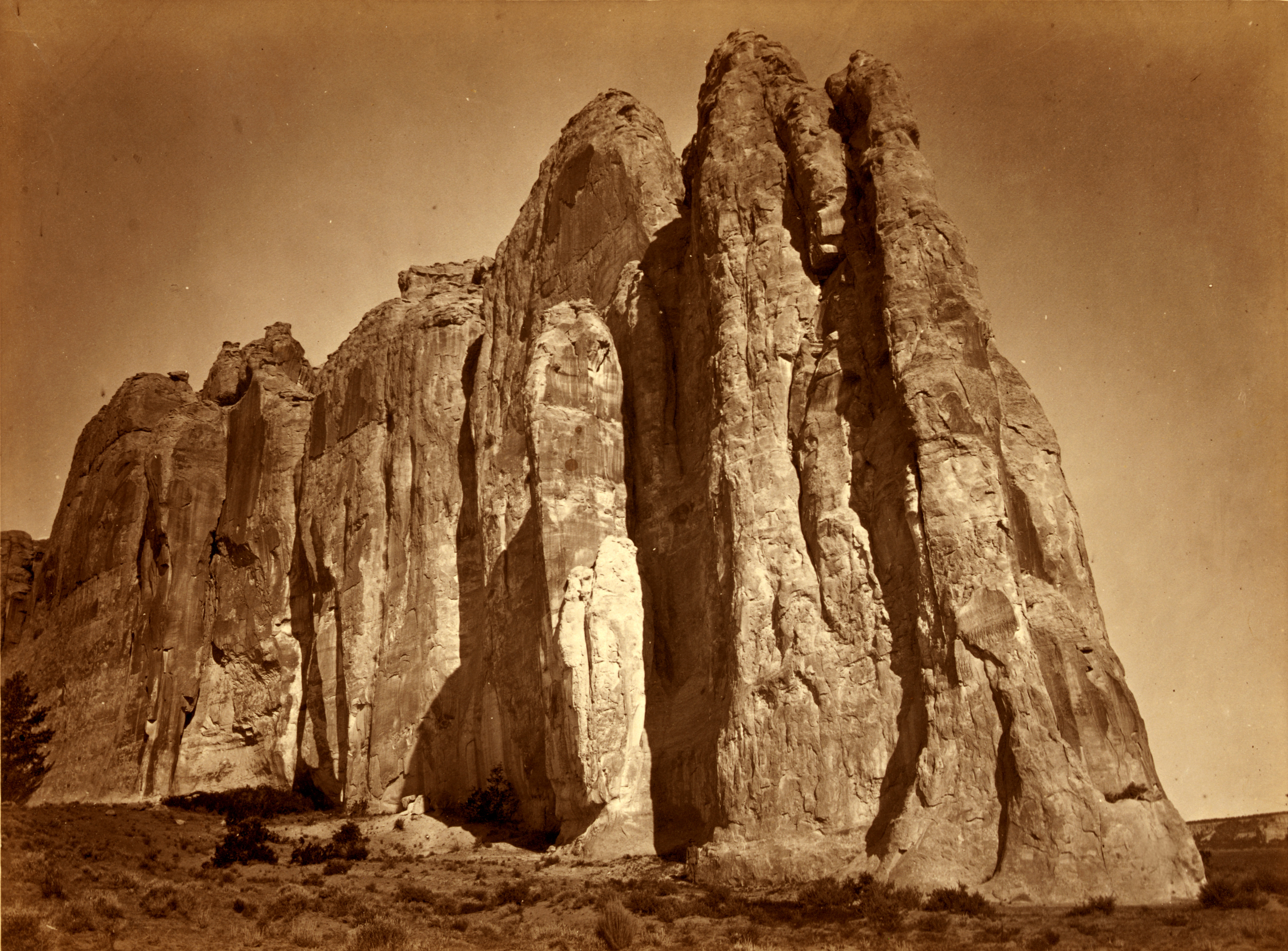
Inscription Rock in New Mexico where Udell carved his name on 8 July 1858 during his fourth overland journey from Missouri to California

Udell made his first overland trip to California in 1850 to seek his fortune in the Gold Rush. His sons, Oliver and Henry (by that time young men), accompanied him. When Udell returned to Ohio after failing to make any money as a miner, they remained in California eventually settling in Allendale, a small town in Solano County. As with his next two trips, Udell had travelled outward on the California Trail and had travelled part of the way back by sea rather than retracing the overland route. His second and third trips to California were in 1852 and 1854. They were no more successful financially than the first one had been. He had to support himself there with a series of odd jobs. In 1856, a year after his arrival back in Ohio, he published his first diary, Incidents of Travel to California Across the Great Plains, which detailed the 1850, 1852, and 1854 journeys.

Udell undertook his final overland journey to California in 1858. This time he travelled with his wife Emily. They were in their mid-60s and the intention was to stay in California permanently, living out their old age near their sons Oliver and Henry. They began their journey in Missouri travelling via the Santa Fe Trail. They joined the Rose-Baley Party, which was the first emigrant party to attempt the final stretch to California via Beale's Wagon Road, at the time little more than a rough trail. In July the party camped near Inscription Rock (now El Morro National Monument) in New Mexico. Several members of the party, including Leonard Rose, Gillum Baley, and Udell, carved their names into the stone. Their inscriptions can still be seen today. On 30 August, as the emigrants were preparing to cross the Colorado River, the first of the party's wagons to arrive at the crossing were attacked by Mojave Indians, leaving twelve emigrants wounded and eight dead, including five children. Having lost most of their livestock and fearful of further attacks, the party decided to trek the 500 miles back to Albuquerque, New Mexico. Udell wrote in his diary on 31 August 1858:

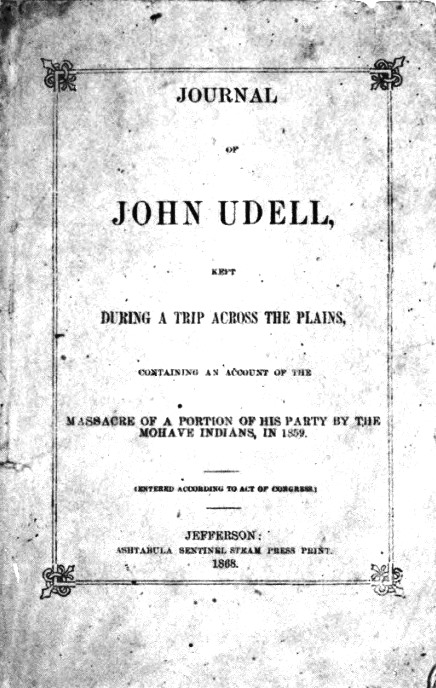
Journal of John Udell, Kept During a Trip Across the Plains (1868 cover)

I was in the worst situation of anyone in the company who had a family, my wife being 65 years of age and so feeble that she was not able to walk, and I had not an ox or hoof left, except an Indian pony which I had kept at my wagon and he was so worn down he could scarcely travel. [...] There was not half enough provision in the company to sustain us until we could reach white settlements so that in all probability we must all perish by the hands of merciless savages or by starvation. [...] Indeed, I almost envied the lot of those of our comrades who were left dead behind us, their lifeless bodies to be burned by the savage foe, as is the custom of those Indians.

== Later years ==
Udell and his wife made it safely to Albuquerque in November 1858 despite the extreme hardships of the trek back. He managed to get a job there taking care of the US Army's livestock, and the following spring he and his wife set out again for California. This time they travelled with Edward Beale's road construction party. The couple finally arrived in Los Angeles in June 1859. They took a boat to San Francisco and then made their way to Solano County to join their sons. Later that year, the Solano County Herald published Udell's diary of his journey with the Rose-Baley Party and its aftermath.

Emily Udell died in 1868 and is buried in Dixon Cemetery in Solano County. John remarried in 1871 to Clarinda Anderson and moved to Healdsburg in Sonoma County. He died three years later at the age of 79. According to Charles W. Baley in his 2002 book Disaster at the Colorado: Beale's Wagon Road and the First Emigrant Party, Udell's name does not appear in the records of either Solano or Sonoma County after 1872, and his exact place of death is unknown. He is buried in Paskenta Cemetery in Tehama County, California where one of his daughters was living at the time of his death.

Udell appears as a character in the 1995 children's novel Sallie Fox: The Story of a Pioneer Girl. The book, based in part on Udell's second diary, is a semi-fictionalized biography of Sallie Fox who as a twelve-year-old child had travelled with the Rose-Baley Party. She survived both the Mojave attack which killed her stepfather and the trek back to Albuquerque during which her half-brother died. Like John and Emily Udell, she and her remaining family eventually reached California in 1859.

== Diaries ==
- Incidents of Travel to California Across the Great Plains; Together with the Return Trips through Central American and Jamaica to which are Added Sketches of the Author's Life.

This diary, chronicling Udell's first three trips from the American Midwest to California overland by wagon and back again by sea was published in Ohio by the Ashtabula Sentinel in 1856. In addition to what book collector and bibliographer Henry Wagner described as a "long account of his restless wanderings", the book also contains an autobiographical sketch and articles on California and the United States Constitution. Original copies are held in the Huntington Library and the Degolyer Library at Southern Methodist University.

- Journal of John Udell, Kept During a Trip Across the Plains, Containing an Account of the Massacre of a Portion of his Party by the Mojave Indians in 1859.

Udell's second diary, which subsequently served as the primary source for 21st-century accounts of the ill-fated Rose-Baley Party, was first published in 1859 by the Solano County Herald. It was republished on its own by the Sentinel Steam Press in 1868. It was published again in 1946 with an introduction by Lyle H. Wright as part of the California Centennial Series.
