= Gillum Baley =

American judge

- Baley circa 1885
- Born: June 19, 1813; Gallatin County, Illinois
- Died: November 11, 1895 (aged 82); Fresno, California
- Known for: American pioneer and County Judge of Fresno County, California

Gillum Baley (June 19, 1813 – November 11, 1895) was an American pioneer and judge. With Leonard Rose he led the ill-fated Rose–Baley Party, the first emigrant wagon train to attempt the journey from New Mexico to California via Beale's Wagon Road. He was one of the earliest settlers of Bailey Flats, California, which was named for him, and eventually settled in nearby Millerton (at the time the seat of Fresno County) where he served as County Judge for twelve years.

== Early life ==
Baley's ancestors originally came from Virginia. He was born in Gallatin County, Illinois, on the Ohio river, between Flynn's and Ford's Ferry where his father William Baley had a farm. His father moved the family to Missouri when Baley was a small child. However, at the age of 13 he returned to Illinois working on farms for five years, first in Sangamon County and then in Pike County. When the Black Hawk War broke out in 1832, Gillum and his older brother Caleb enlisted in the Illinois Mounted Militia where he was elected a sergeant despite being only 19 at the time. After the conflict ended, he returned to Pike County and married Catherine Decker in 1834. She died of measles in 1836, leaving Baley with an infant son, Moses.

After his wife's death, Baley returned to Missouri, initially settling in Jackson County where he farmed and raised livestock and in late 1836 married Permelia Eleanor Myers. By the late 1840s, Baley, his older brother Caleb, and his younger brother Right had all settled in Nodaway County. In addition to running his farm, Baley also served as a Methodist lay preacher and rode circuit as a justice of the peace for the county despite having only studied law informally. With the advent of the California Gold Rush in 1849, the three brothers left their wives in charge of the farms in Missouri and made the overland journey to California to seek their fortunes. Caleb died there in 1850, shortly after arriving. Gillum and Right stayed on in the gold fields for two years before returning to their families in Missouri but had become convinced that their future lay in California.

== The Rose–Baley Party ==
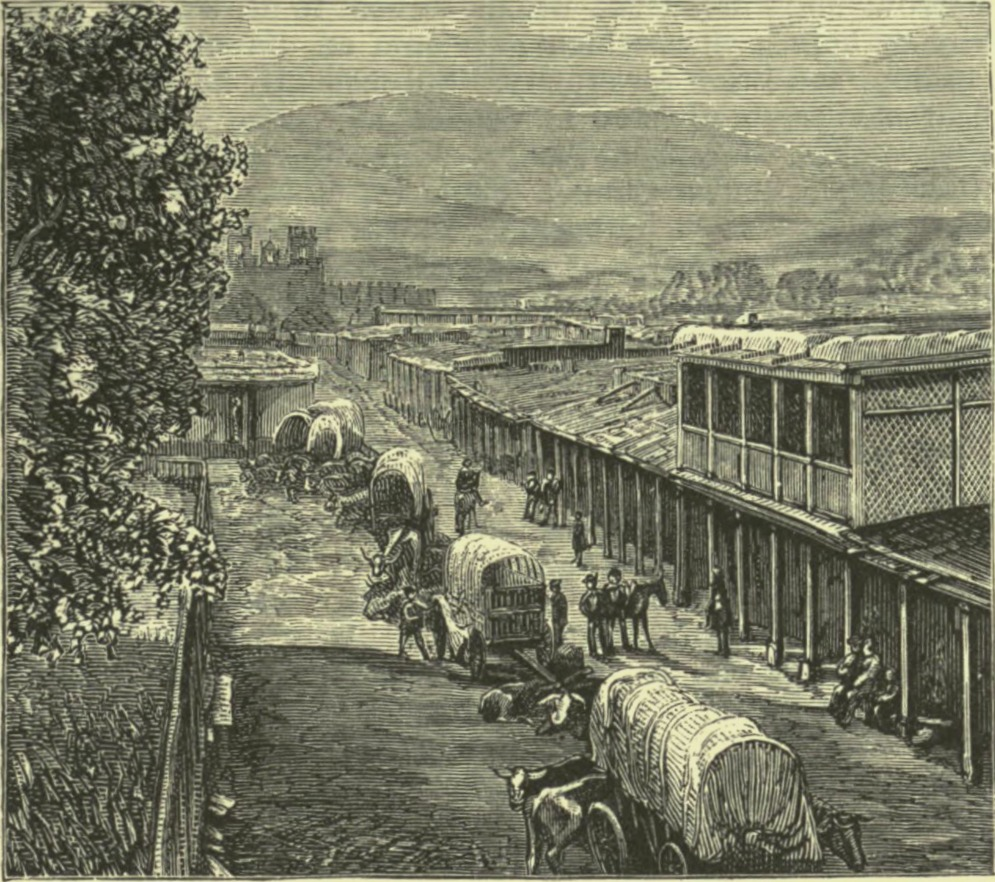
19th-century depiction of wagon trains entering Santa Fe, New Mexico

In April 1858, Baley and his brother Right assembled a wagon train to travel to California where they intended to spend the rest of their lives. By this time Gillum and Permelia Baley had nine children, the youngest only six weeks old. Right Baley and his wife Nancy had eight children, and she was pregnant with their 9th. Also in their party were their Missouri neighbors, Thomas and Joel Hedgpeth and their families. In mid-May while resting at Cottonwood Creek, near present-day Durham, Kansas, they were joined by a party led by Leonard Rose which had left Iowa in April and also intended to travel to California via the Santa Fe Trail. In the interests of safety, the groups agreed to an informal merger. When the combined party reached Albuquerque, New Mexico, they decided to attempt the final stretch to California via Beale's Wagon Road, at the time little more than a rough trail.

On August 30, as the emigrants were preparing to cross the Colorado River, the first of the party's wagons to arrive at the crossing point were attacked by Mojave Indians, leaving twelve emigrants wounded and eight dead, including five children. Having lost most of their livestock and fearful of further attacks, the surviving members of the Rose–Baley party trekked the 500 miles back to Albuquerque. The two Baley families made it safely to Albuquerque in November 1858, despite the extreme hardships of the journey back, and remained there for several months. They made two more attempts to reach California the following year. The first ended in failure when their cattle died and provisions gave out. Faced with starvation they returned to Albuquerque. They eventually made it to California on their third attempt, this time by crossing the Colorado at Fort Yuma, and made their way to Visalia in the San Joaquin Valley to begin their new life.

== Later years ==
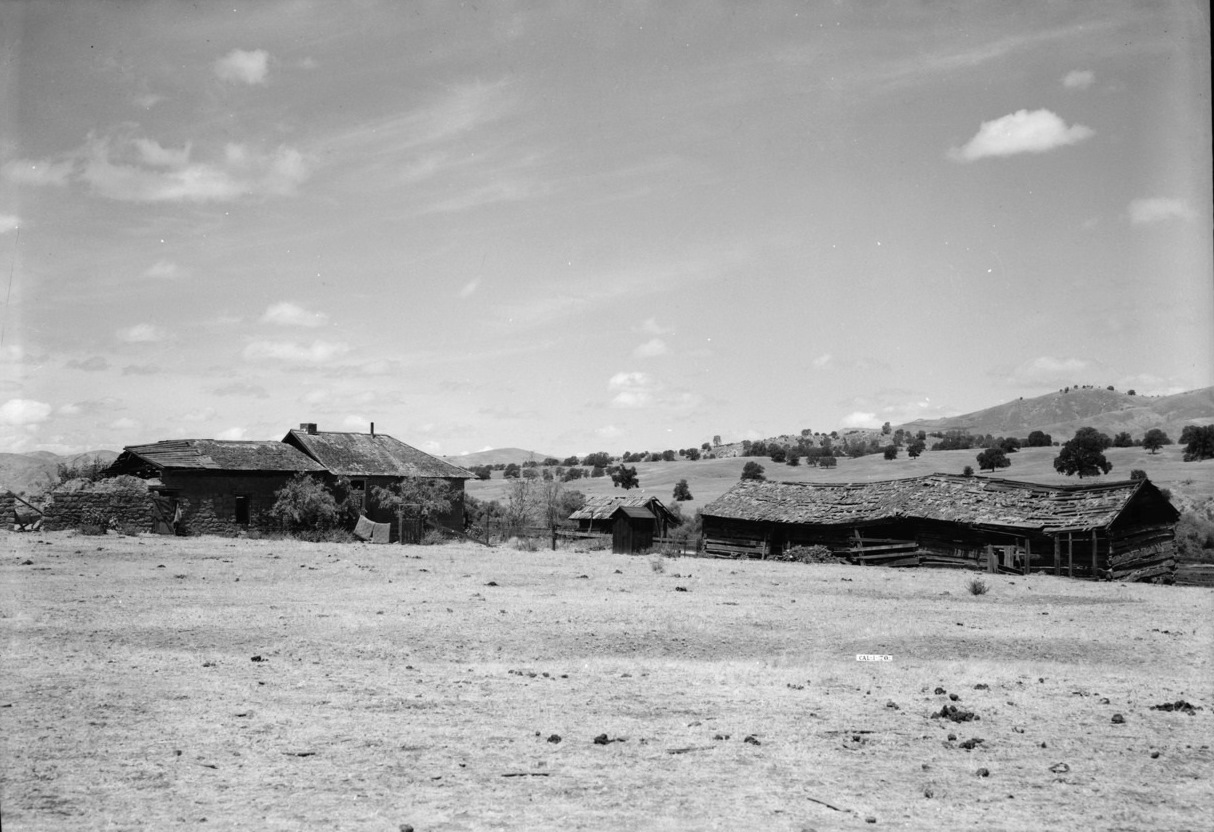
Ruins of Fort Miller, California in 1936. Gillum Baley and his family lived in the fort's disused buildings from 1860 to 1861

The Gillum and Right Baley families arrived in Visalia in November 1859. Right Baley and his family remained there, but in early 1860 Gillum relocated his family to a site near Fort Miller where they lived in disused army buildings. There he made enough money from mining in the San Joaquin, Fresno and Chowchilla Rivers to acquire some livestock and a homestead. He built a house and started a cattle and dairy farm in the area now known as Bailey (or Baley) Flats which lay at the conjunction of three forks of the Chowchilla River. The homestead was completely washed out in the floods of 1862/63, despite attempts to save the house by moving it piece-by-piece to higher ground. The family then moved into Millerton, which at the time was the seat of Fresno County. Baley got a job as a justice of the peace, and in 1867 was elected the County Judge, a post which he held for the next 12 years.

Following his retirement from the bench in 1878, Baley and his wife moved to Fresno. He went into the grocery business with his son-in-law and was later elected County Treasurer. In addition to his own business, he had invested heavily in other local firms but lost everything in the panic of 1893. Now in their mid-seventies, he and his wife were forced to turn their home into a boarding house to make ends meet. He also filed a claim with the Senate Committee on Indian Depredations seeking reparation for the losses suffered in the 1858 Mojave attack on the Rose–Baley Party. The claim was eventually rejected, although Baley died in 1895 before the final decision. His funeral was held in Fresno's St Paul's Methodist Church of which he had been the founder. His wife Permelia lived on until 1906. They are buried together in the Academy Cemetery in Clovis, California.

Baley appears as a character in the 1995 children's novel Sallie Fox: The Story of a Pioneer Girl which was based in part on the diary of John Udell, a member of the Rose–Baley Party. The book is a semi-fictionalized biography of Sallie Fox who as a twelve-year-old child had also travelled with the Rose-Baley Party, surviving both the Mojave attack which killed her stepfather and the trek back to Albuquerque during which her half-brother died. Like Baley and his family, she and her remaining family eventually reached California in 1859.

== Sources ==
- Angel, Myron (1892). A memorial and biographical history of the counties of Fresno, Tulare and Kern, California. Lewis Publishing Company
- Baley, Charles W. (2002). Disaster at the Colorado: Beale's Wagon Road and the First Emigrant Party. Logan, UT: Utah State University Press. ISBN 978-0-87421-437-6. "Free Download Full Text"
- Coate, Bill (October 18, 2013). "Pioneer got more than he bargained for", pp. B1–B2. Madera Tribune
- Udell, John (1946). Journal of John Udell, Kept During a Trip Across the Plains. N. A. Kovach
- Vandor, Paul E. (1919). History of Fresno County, California, with biographical sketches of the leading men and women of the county who have been identified with its growth and development from the early days to the present, Vol. 1. Historic Record Company
