= Rose–Baley Party =

Emigrant wagon train going to California

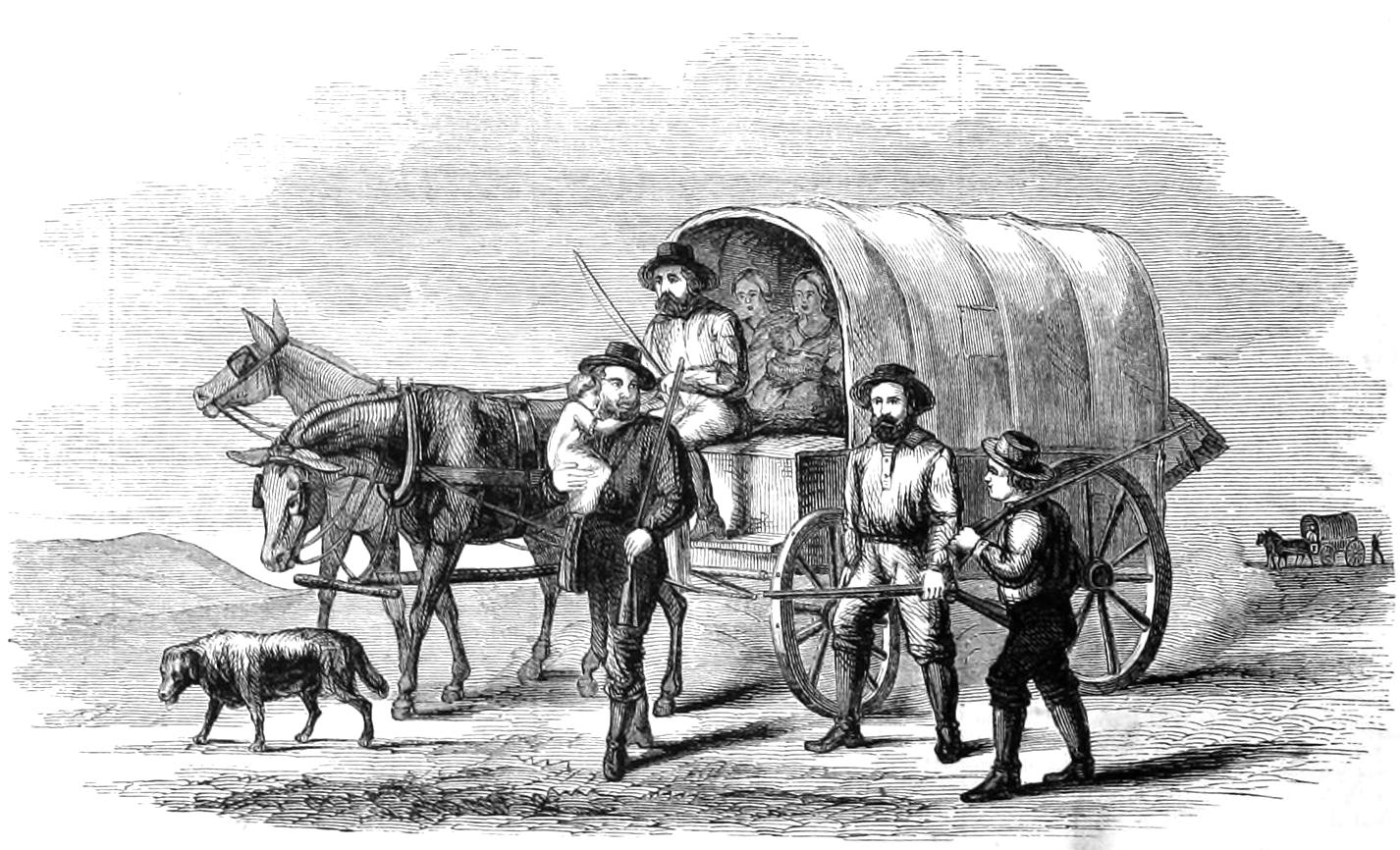
European American emigrants on their way to California, c. 1859

The Rose–Baley Party was the first European American emigrant wagon train to traverse the 35th parallel route known as Beale's Wagon Road, established by Edward Fitzgerald Beale, from Zuni Pueblo, New Mexico to the Colorado River near present-day Needles, California.

In 1858, a wealthy businessman from Keosauqua, Iowa, Leonard John Rose, formed the party after hearing stories from gold miners returning from California. He subsequently financed a well-equipped wagon train that included twenty horses and two hundred head of purebred red Durham cattle. He also acquired four large covered wagons and three yoke of oxen to pull each wagon. The Rose company left Iowa in early April, and in mid-May they were joined by the Baley company, led by a forty-four-year-old veteran of the Black Hawk War, Gillum Baley. Their combined outfits numbered twenty wagons, forty men, fifty to sixty women and children, and nearly five hundred head of cattle. John Udell, a 62-year-old Baptist minister kept a daily journal of the party's travels, recording the locations of their campsites, documenting their progress, and noting the availability of resources.

On August 30, 1858, after having traveled more than 1,200 miles (1,900 km) in four months, the Rose–Baley Party were attacked as they prepared to cross the Colorado River near present-day Needles, California. Eight members of the party were killed, including five children, and thirteen wounded. The emigrants killed several of the attackers, and decided to backtrack more than 500 miles (800 km) to Albuquerque, New Mexico, instead of continuing on to their intended destination in southern California.

== Sourcing ==
According to Charles W. Baley, great-grandnephew of Baley company leader, Gillum Baley, and the author of Disaster at the Colorado: Beale's Wagon Road and the First Emigrant Party (2002), little has been written about Beale's Wagon Road because the negative experiences of the first wagon trains to attempt the passage effectively "discouraged its use". Baley's great-grandparents joined his great-great uncle in forming the company in 1858, which merged with one led by Leonard John Rose to make the Rose–Baley Party.

Baley's account drew heavily from the only known journal kept by a member of the group. John Udell, a 62-year-old Baptist minister who had left his home in Missouri with his wife, Emily, kept a daily record of the party's travels, recording the locations of their campsites and their estimated distance from Missouri, the weather and road conditions, and the availability of grass, water, and wood. Baley described Udell's journal as the "basic framework" of his research. The only other source of firsthand information is Rose, whose account was printed in the Missouri Republican in 1859, and later reprinted as an appendix in Dr. Robert Glass Cleland's work, The Cattle on a Thousand Hills: Southern California, 1850–1880.

== E.F. Beale expedition ==
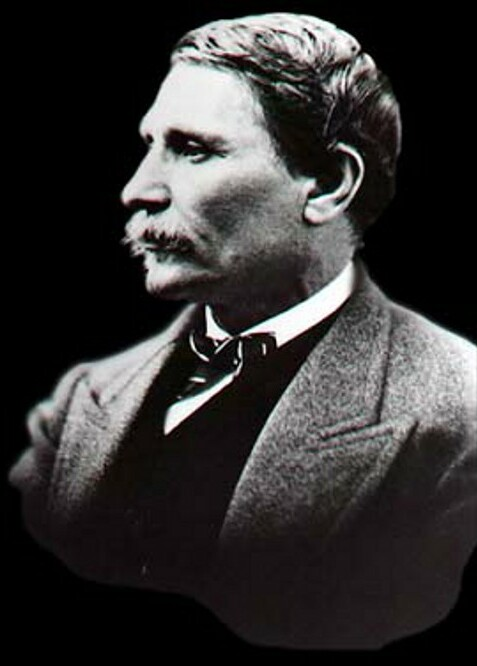
E.F. Beale

In October 1857, an expedition led by Edward Fitzgerald Beale was tasked with establishing a trade route along the 35th parallel from Fort Smith, Arkansas to Los Angeles, California. (Note: Beale's Wagon Road would eventually be supplanted first by the railroad, then U.S. Route 66, and later, Interstate 40.) The wagon road began at Fort Smith and continued through Fort Defiance, Arizona before crossing the Colorado River near present-day Needles, California. (Note: The Mojave Road stretches from where Beale's Wagon Road meets the Colorado River to southern California.) The location where Beale crossed the river, en route to California, became known as Beale's Crossing. Beale described the route, "It is the shortest from our western frontier by 300 miles (480 km), being nearly directly west. It is the most level: our wagons only double-teaming once in the entire distance, and that at a short hill, and over a surface heretofore unbroken by wheels or trail on any kind. It is well-watered: our greatest distance without water at any time being 20 miles (32 km). It is well-timbered, and in many places the growth is far beyond that of any part of the world I have ever seen. It is temperate in climate, passing for the most part over an elevated region. It is salubrious: not one of our party requiring the slightest medical attendance from the time of our leaving to our arrival ... It crosses the great desert (which must be crossed by any road to California) at its narrowest point."

== Formation ==
During the summer of 1858, a large emigrant wagon train became the first to traverse Beale's 35th parallel route to Mohave country. A wealthy businessman from Keosauqua, Iowa, Leonard John Rose, known as L.J. Rose, formed a company with his family of seven, his foreman, Alpha Brown, and his family, and seventeen grubstakers, workers who were not paid a salary, but given food and board in exchange for their labor. Rose was born in Rottenburg, Germany in 1827; at the age of eight, he immigrated to the United States. In 1892, writing in The Californian, he identified what motivated him to leave Iowa, where he had built several successful businesses:

In 1858 some miners who had just returned from California so fired my imagination with descriptions of its glorious climate, wealth of flowers, and luscious fruits, that I was inspired with an irresistible desire to experience in person the delights to be found in the land of plenty.

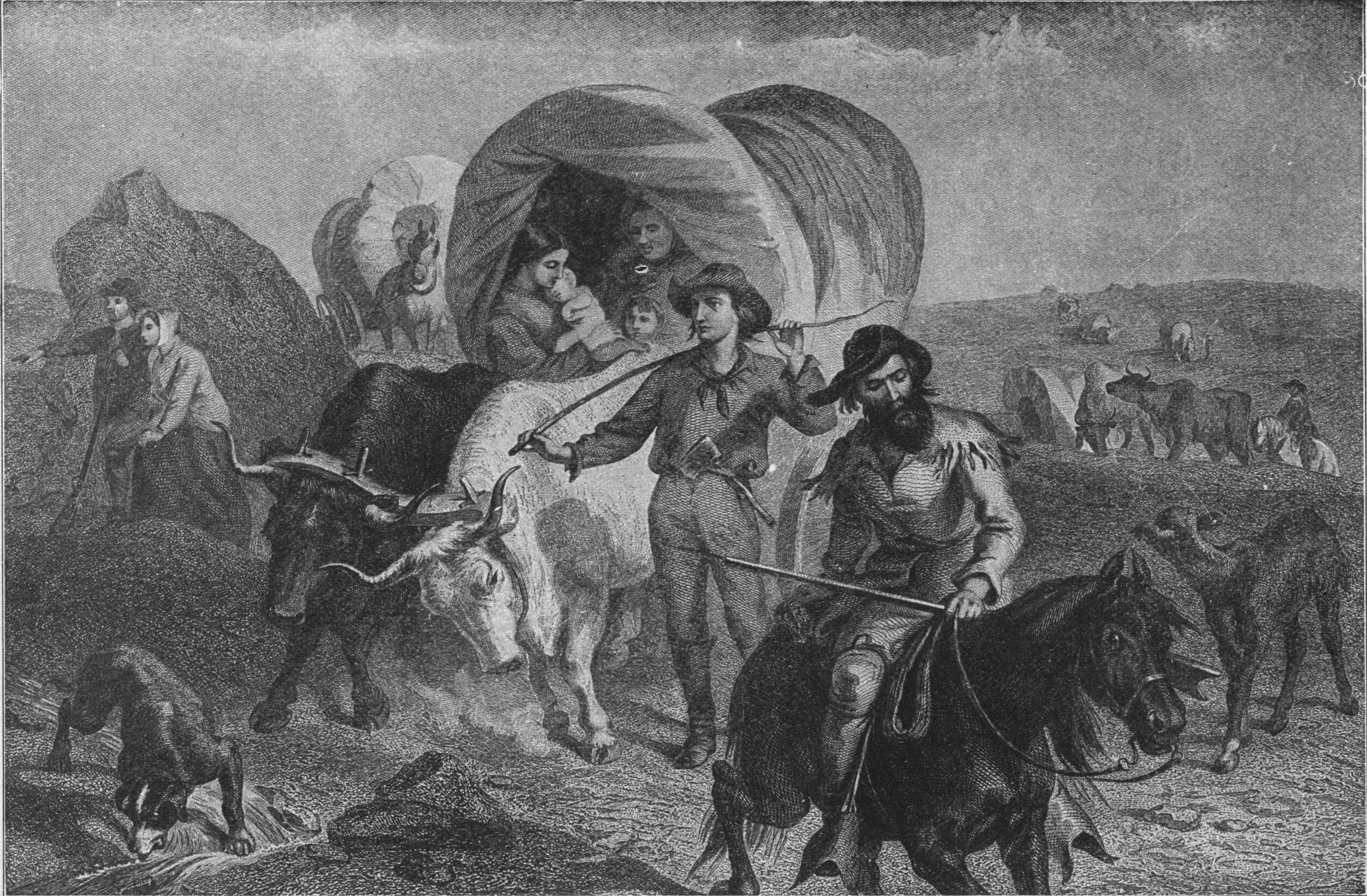
A "prairie schooner" covered wagon, 1909

To finance the venture, Rose sold the majority of his assets, and after paying off his debts was left with $30,000, then a considerable amount of money. These funds enabled him to finance an especially well-equipped wagon train that included twenty horses, including two Morgan fillies and a Morgan stallion named Black Morrill; their combined value exceeded $3,000. He also purchased two hundred head of red Durham cattle, which he planned to resell in California for profit. To complete the train, Rose acquired four large ox-drawn prairie schooner style covered wagons, each required three yokes (i.e. six oxen) to pull each wagon. Three wagons were loaded with supplies, and the fourth was used by Alpha Brown and his family. Rose's family traveled in a small wagon that had once been used as an ambulance, which was pulled by a pair of mules.

According to Baley, political and economic factors prompted two Hedgpeth and two Baley families to leave northwestern Missouri for California in early 1858. One factor was the enactment of the Kansas-Nebraska Act, which admitted Nebraska into the Union as a free territory and granted Kansas the right to decide on the legality of slavery within the state. The resulting tensions between pro-slavery and anti-slavery groups fueled conflict near the Missouri state line, affecting its western counties, including Nodaway, where the Baleys and Hedgpeths lived. In Baley's opinion, the financial Panic of 1857 further contributed to instability in the region, driving many mid-westerners to seek a better life in California. The combined Baley-Hedgpeth outfits were led by a 44-year-old veteran of the Black Hawk War, Gillum Baley, and comprising eight Murphy wagons, 62 oxen, 75 head of cattle, and several riding horses. They employed half-a-dozen grubstakers to tend their stock. (Note: Both the Baley and Hedgpeth companies also brought small libraries with them.)

== Journey ==
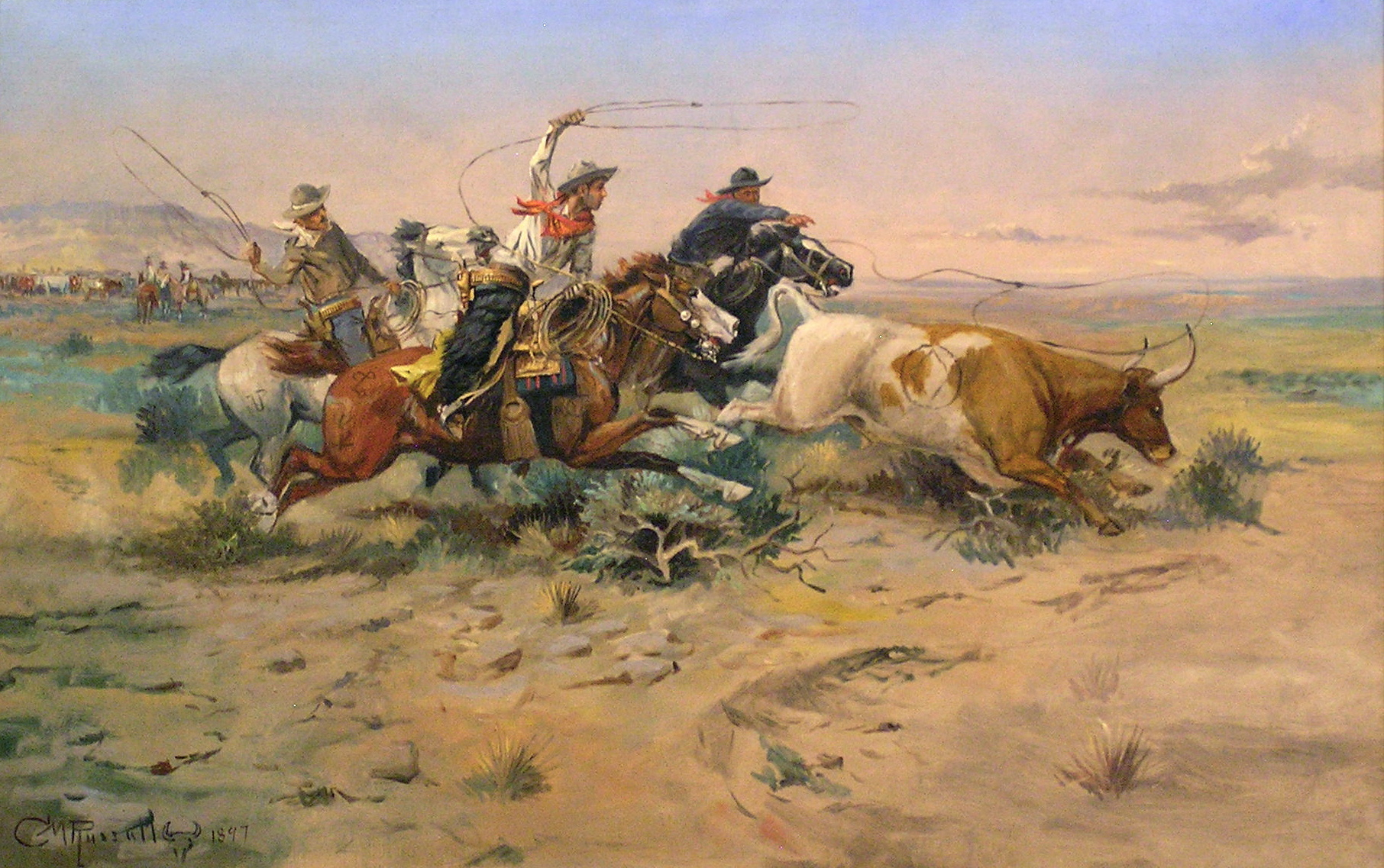
A classic image of the American cowboy, as portrayed by C.M. Russell

The Rose company left Iowa in April; they traveled to Kansas City, Missouri, then named Westport, which they reached via steamboat across the Missouri River. In mid-May, they were joined by the Baley company while resting at Cottonwood Creek, near present-day Durham, Kansas. In the interests of safety, the groups agreed to an informal merger; their combined outfits numbered 20 wagons, 40 men, 50 to 60 women and children, and nearly 500 head of unbranded cattle.

Baley notes that whereas most emigrants who traveled from the Midwestern United States to the West Coast took the Oregon Trail, in 1858 concerns about the Mormon War led many, including the Rose–Baley Party, to avoid Utah by taking the Santa Fe Trail to New Mexico Territory, where a viable southern route could then be taken to California. (Note: According to J.W. Cheney, their decision to avoid Utah by taking a southern route added 500 mi (800 km) to the trip. Cheney wrote a story about the party in 1915, his material drew heavily from an account given to him by Edward Akey, a member of the Rose company.) The Santa Fe Trail followed the Arkansas River until it split into two paths near Cimarron, Kansas. The Mountain Branch continued into the mountains of southern Colorado, and the Cimarron Cutoff avoided mountains, but traversed the 50 mi (80 km)-wide Cimarron Desert before the paths met near Las Vegas, New Mexico. The Cimarron Cutoff was 100 miles (160 km) shorter and easier to navigate with large wagons, but according to Baley it also led its travelers through the territory of the hostile Comanche and Kiowa people. Nonetheless, the Rose–Baley Party chose this path. (Note: In 1831, famed mountain man Jedediah Smith was killed by Comanches while taking the Cimarron Cutoff.)

The wagon train reached Albuquerque, New Mexico on June 23 and prepared for the journey to the Colorado River by way of Zuni Pueblo, New Mexico, where, despite Udell's lone dissent, they would become the first emigrant train to venture onto Beale's Wagon Road. Udell, writing in his journal, explained his concern: "I thought it was preposterous to start on so long a journey with so many woman and helpless children, and so many dangers attending the attempt." According to Baley, the emigrants first learned of the recently surveyed road while visiting Albuquerque. Townspeople and army officers, including Benjamin Bonneville, encouraged them to take the new route, which was shorter than the established southern trails by 200 miles (320 km), or approximately 30 days travel. They were also told that there was a reliable supply of food and water along the way, and the area was free of hostile Native Americans. E.F. Beale was in Washington, D.C. at the time, making recommendations to members of Congress and the War Department:

I regard the establishment of a military post on the Colorado River as an indispensable necessity for the emigrant over this road; for although the Indians living in the rich meadow lands are agricultural, and consequently peaceable, they are very numerous, so much so that we counted 800 men around our camp on the second day after our arrival on the banks of the river. The temptation of scattered emigrant parties with their families, and the confusion of inexperienced teamsters, rafting so wide and rapid a river with their wagons and families, would offer too strong a temptation for the Indians to withstand.

Beale suggested that, in addition to a military fort, the route was also in immediate need of bridges and dams to ensure safe travel and provide a reliable water supply; he requested US$100,000 to fund the improvements. Further complicating the journey, the only pockets of civilization between Albuquerque and San Bernardino, California, a distance of 600 miles (970 km), were the Zuni and Laguna pueblos. According to Baley, U.S. Army officers stationed in Albuquerque insisted the emigrants hire Jose Manuel Savedra, a Mexican guide who had traveled with Beale during his initial survey of the route, and his interpreter, Petro. Unbeknownst to the group, Beale was unhappy with Savedra's scouting abilities, and had demoted him to helping with the animals in the pack train. The Rose–Baley Party paid Savedra's fee of US$500 in advance.

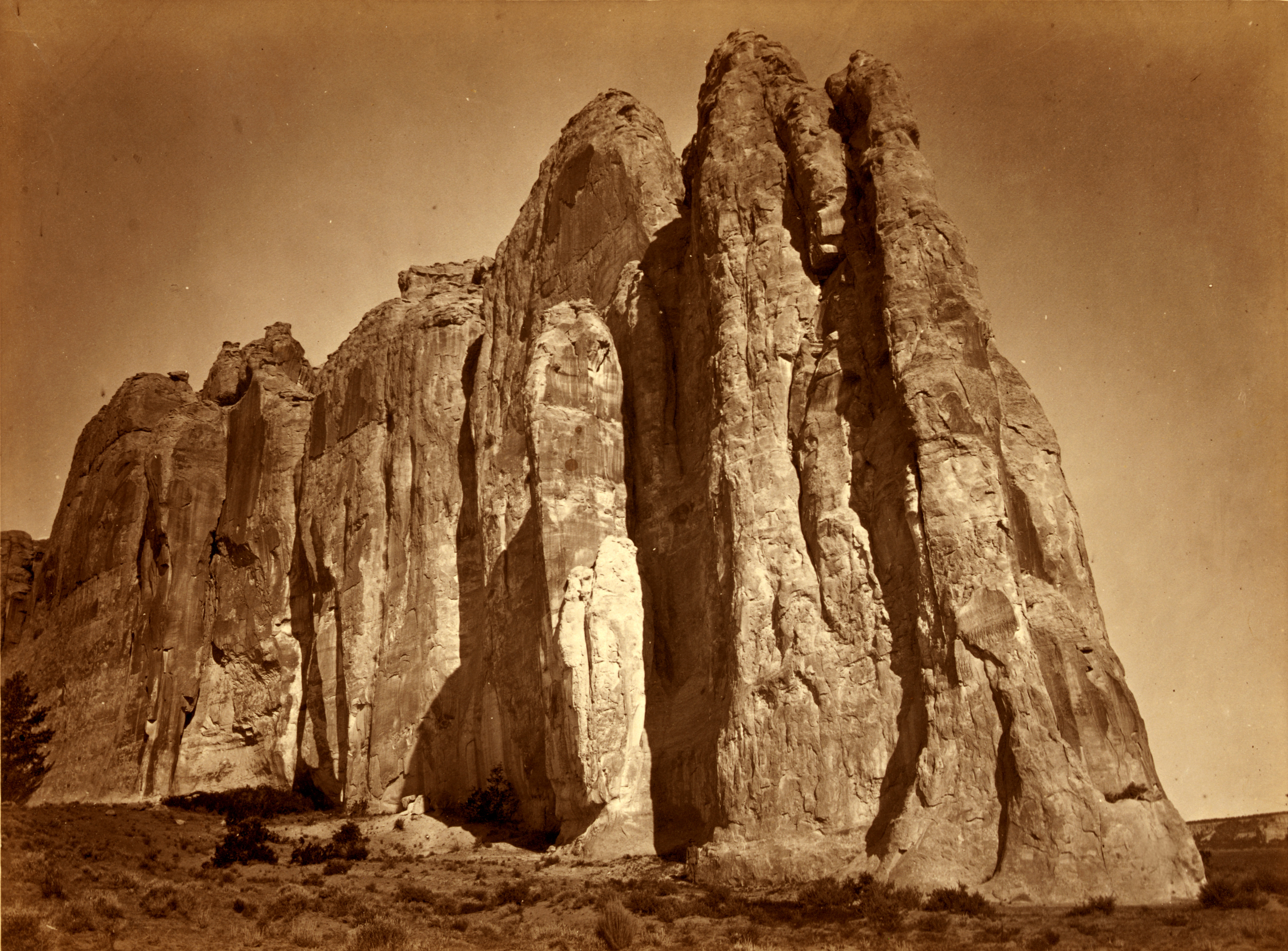
El Morro in 1873

Udell recorded that the Rose–Baley Party left Albuquerque on June 26 and began crossing the Rio Grande on a ferry. Three days later, as the last of their outfit crossed, one of Rose's men, Frank Emerdick, drowned in the river. Baley notes that they traveled for the next five days and, because there were no suitable campsites nearby, did not stop to celebrate Independence Day, as would most westbound emigrants. On July 5, they reached the Zuni Mountains, a branch of the Rocky Mountains; two days later they traversed the Continental Divide of the Americas, which, although 8,000 feet (2,400 m) to 9,000 feet (2,700 m) feet in elevation, was a relatively easy passage. Udell described the road as "smooth and fine, we traveled it in a day with our ox teams, and no hard labor." On July 7, they camped near El Morro National Monument, then called Inscription Rock, and several members of the party, including Rose and Udell, carved their names into stone —a tradition dating back to 1605. (Note: The oldest inscription at El Morro National Monument is that of New Mexico's first Spanish governor, Juan de Oñate, who marked the rock on April 16, 1605.) Their inscriptions indicated that they were aware of being the first emigrants in the region.

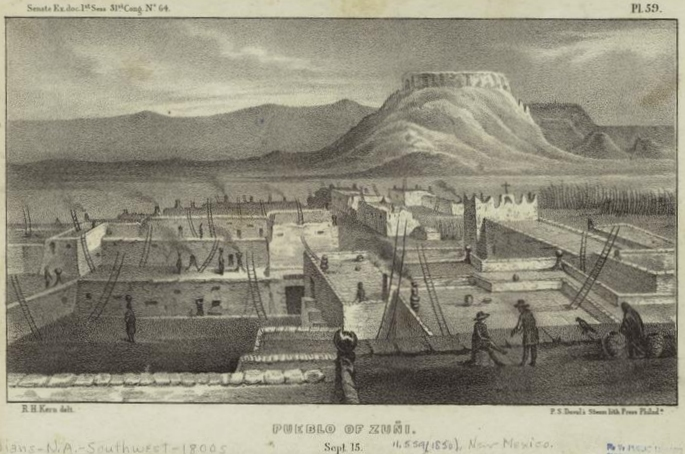
An illustration of Zuni Pueblo, New Mexico, 1850

On July 10, the Rose–Baley Party reached Zuni Pueblo, which according to Baley was then home to as many as 2,000 Native Americans. They spent several hours visiting and sightseeing, and the Zuni sold them cornmeal and vegetables, as this was the last such opportunity to purchase supplies until San Bernardino, approximately 500 miles (800 km) away. According to Baley, this is most likely the first time the Zuni had encountered European women and children, and the first time the emigrants had ever seen people with albinism, which, although rare, was noticeably present in the Zuni population. They left Zuni Pueblo late that afternoon and entered unfamiliar territory that, until now, had only been traversed by Native Americans, explorers, mountain men, and Spanish missionaries. In Baley's opinion, the Rose–Baley Party had previously enjoyed the benefits of a primitive but well-established trail; however, at this point they became the first emigrant wagon train to venture onto the untested Beale's Wagon Road.

== Beale's Wagon Road ==
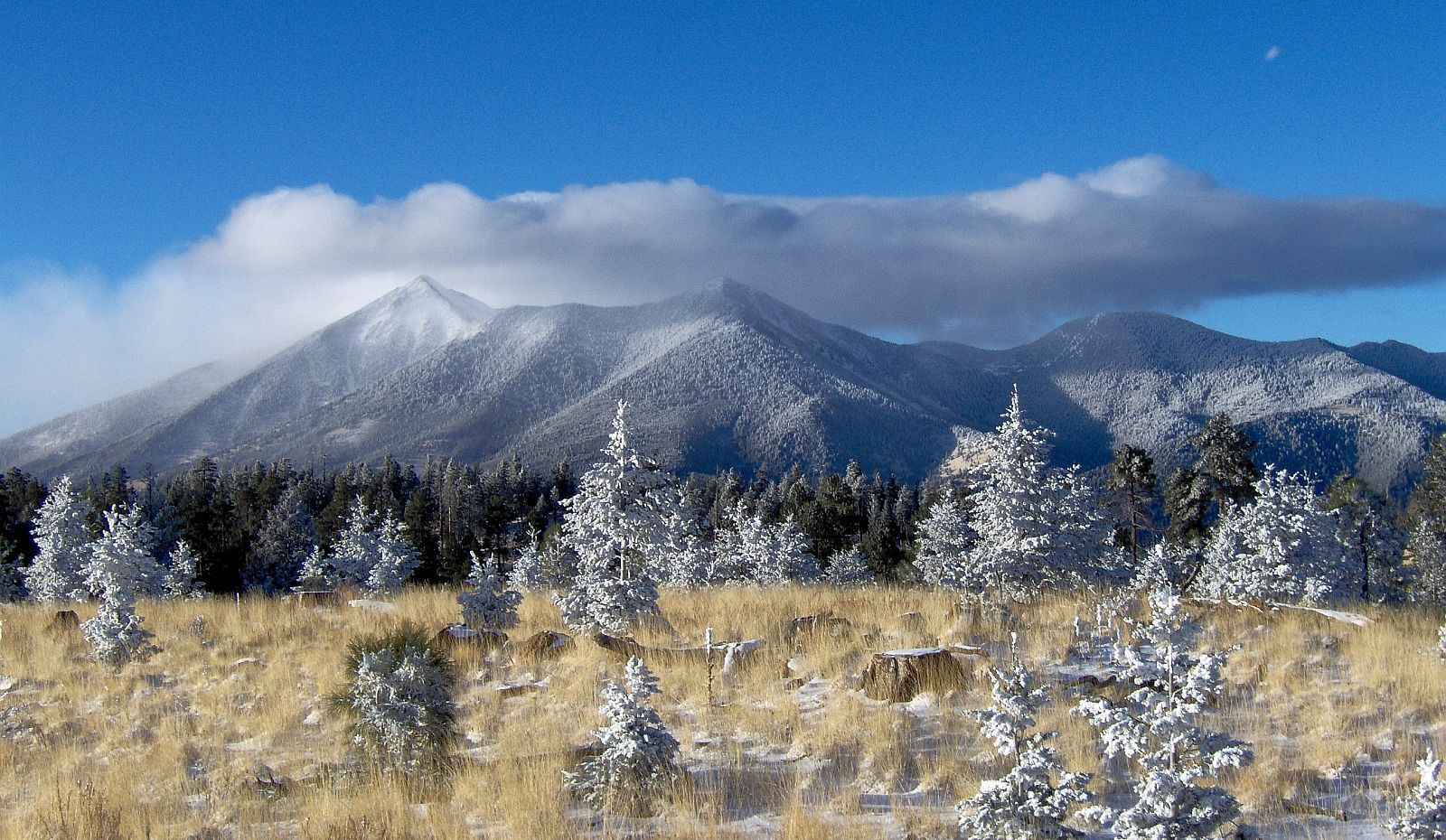
The San Francisco Peaks viewed from atop nearby Mount Elden, elevation 9,301 feet

In Baley's opinion, Udell was right to be concerned about the road, and adds: "although Beale had taken a few wagons over the route, [in 1858 it] was little more than a survey trail marked only by faint wagon tracks, an occasional stone cairn, and perhaps a few axe blazes on trees." Portions of the road followed human and animal trails, and – although potable water was sporadically available – there were also long stretches called jornadas, where it was scarce. From the San Francisco Peaks to the Colorado River, vital resources were in short supply.

Because Beale's Wagon Road crossed territory that consisted mainly of the Colorado Plateau's rocky high desert, the next water available to the Rose–Baley Party was at a spot named Jacob's Well, located 36 miles (58 km) west of Zuni Pueblo and 32 miles (51 km) west of their July 10 campsite. Accordingly, Baley notes that the emigrants were careful to not get lost between watering holes. Udell recorded that, after traveling for more than half a day, they rested and watered their stock at the well, which produced brackish but acceptable water. Later that evening, they trekked another 8 miles (13 km) to Navajo Springs, where they camped for the night and rested the next day. (Note: According to Baley, the party was now entering the domain of the Navajo people, who strongly disliked outsiders in their land. Nevertheless, the emigrants did not see any Navajo in the area, as they passed the warmer months of the year in higher country where they could find plentiful grass for their flocks of sheep.)

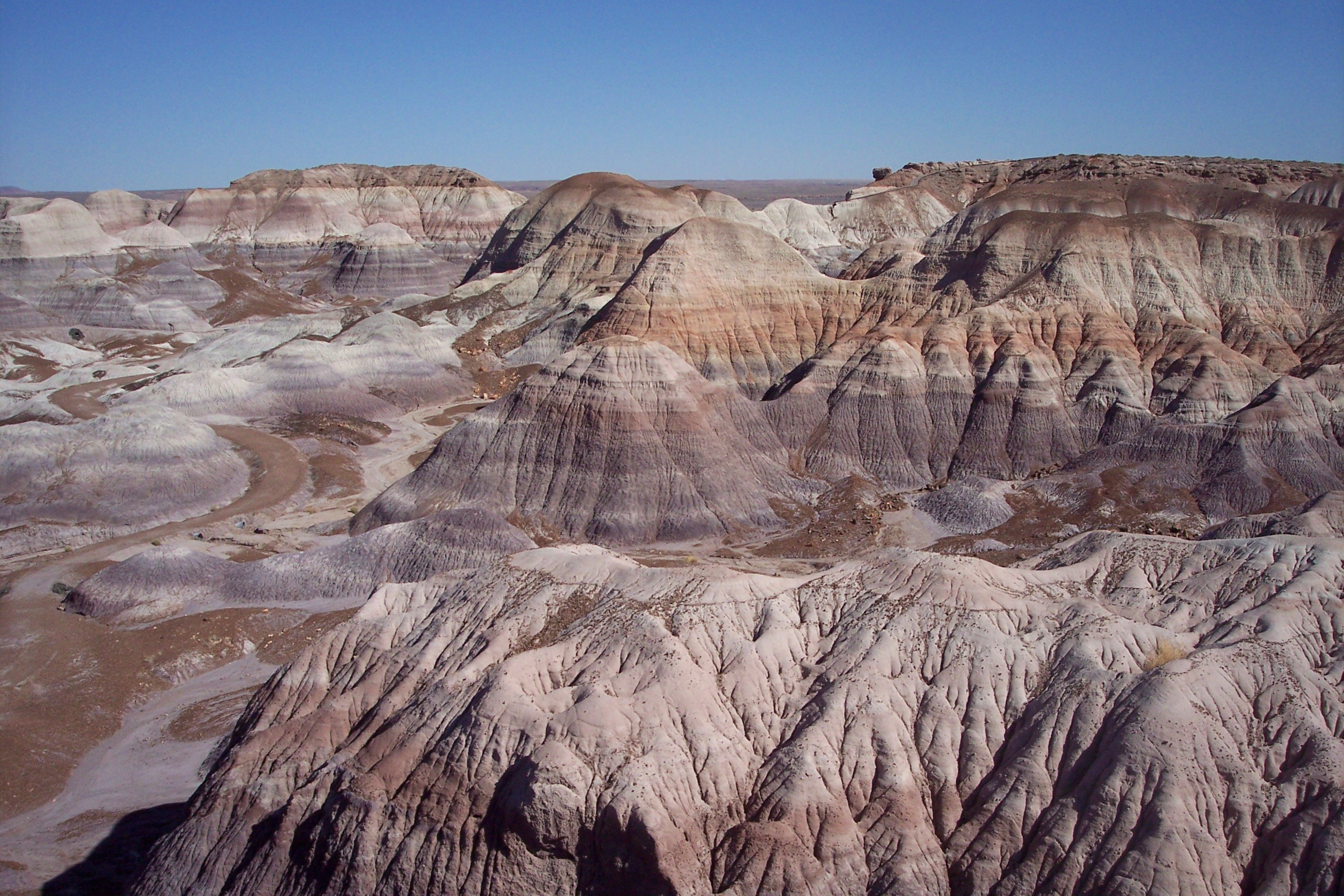
Painted desert and petrified logs seen from Blue Mesa, Petrified Forest National Park

According to Udell's journal, after Navajo Springs the next available water was 40 miles (64 km) distant, at the Little Colorado River. In between was an area that is now home to Petrified Forest National Park, and several members of the party gathered souvenirs of petrified wood there. They reached the Little Colorado at a spot near present-day Holbrook, Arizona, on July 16, and although the river was brackish and underscored with quicksand, the emigrants were able to secure drinkable water by digging holes in the riverbank that allowed sediment to settle until the water was clear enough for consumption. Next, they followed the river 85 miles (137 km) to a location that Baley identified as Canyon Diablo.

On July 18, Udell recorded that spirits were high amongst the Rose–Baley Party: "Our large company continue to be harmonious, friendly, and kind to each other ... General good health prevails ... Travel today, 10 miles (16 km), and 1,112 from the Missouri River." The Rose–Baley Party diverged from the Little Colorado River where it meets Canyon Diablo, near present-day Winslow, Arizona. Uncertain where the next source of clean water was, they decided to camp near the canyon, where they successfully hunted for game while searching for a fresh spring. (Note: While camped near Canyon Diablo, several members of the Rose-Baley Party, including Gillum Baley and Amanda Rose, carved their names into Register Rock No. 4.) By the late afternoon of July 24, Savedra returned to camp and reported that they had found water 17 miles (27 km) away at Walnut Creek, now part of Walnut Canyon National Monument. They immediately packed up their camp and left, as they were becoming accustomed to evening and night travel, which allowed them to refrain from exertion during the peak heat of the day. They covered 20 miles (32 km) on July 25 before stopping near a spring in the pine-covered foothills of Arizona's tallest mountains, the San Francisco Peaks, which can be seen for 100 miles (160 km) in most directions. The range's cool forests gave them a much-needed respite from the intense heat and aridity of the high plains desert.

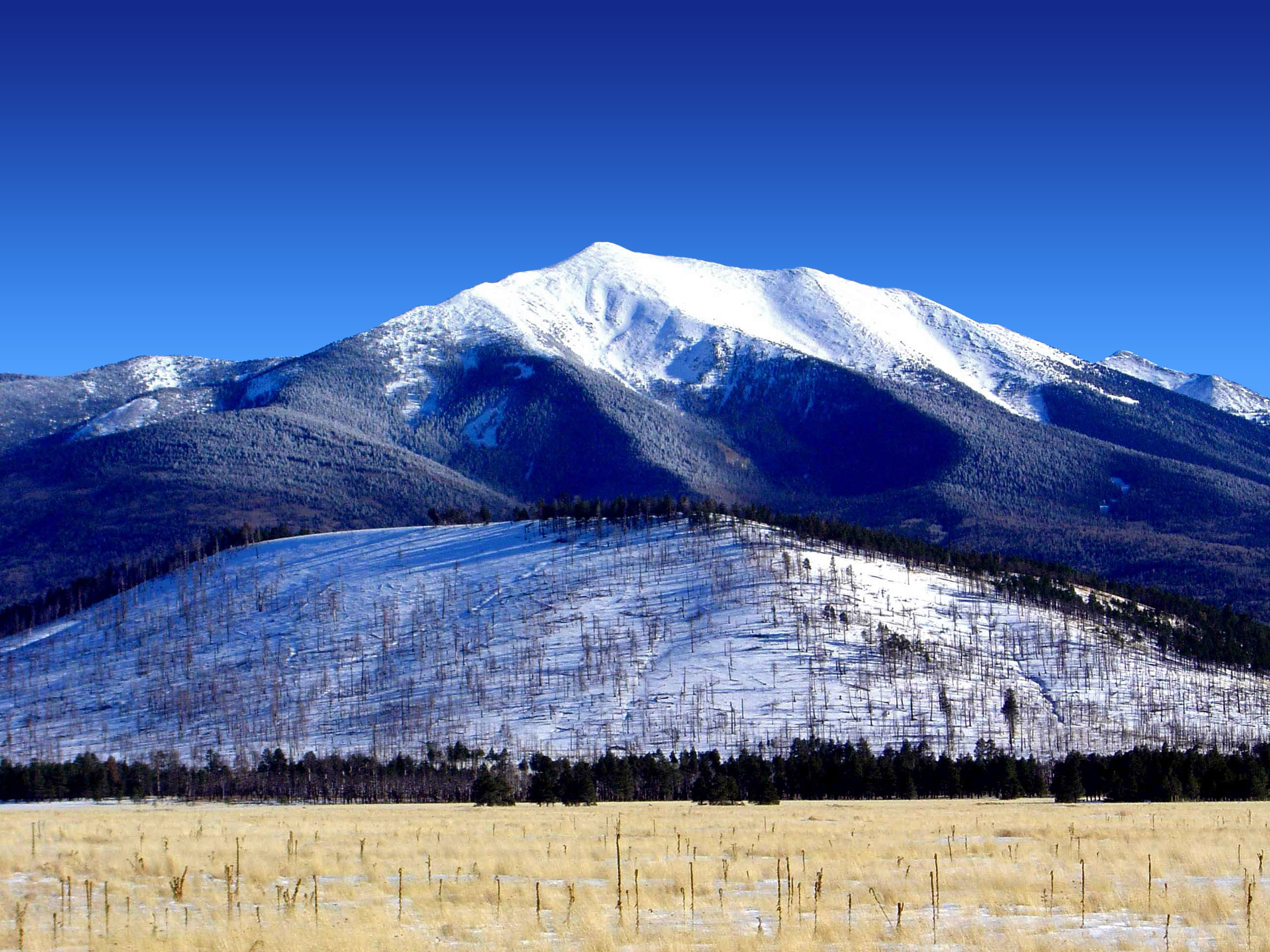
Humphreys Peak in winter

Baley notes that the Rose–Baley Party so enjoyed their camp, near present-day Flagstaff, Arizona, they decided to devote a few extra days to recuperation and sightseeing, and several members of the wagon train climbed Humphreys Peak, which at 12,633 ft (3,851 m) is the highest point in Arizona. While climbing the mountain, they came across a large snowfield and were surprised to see snow and ice in late July. Before their descent, they entertained themselves by pushing a massive boulder down the mountainside. Up to this point, the emigrants had enjoyed a primitive but decent road, good small game hunting, and a consistent supply of water, grass, and wood. They had experienced what Baley described as "beautiful and interesting" scenery and encountered only friendly Native Americans; however, a drastic change in these conditions was imminent.

According to Baley, on July 29 Savedra informed the Rose–Baley Party, now camped near Leroux Springs, that the next reliable drinking water was seventy or 80 miles (130 km) away, and there would not be a closer source until the coming rainy season. This distance exceeded what most animals could travel without water, and several members of the party were opposed to proceeding any further west until another source had been found. Udell disagreed, "I contended that we had better travel on, for, with careful and proper treatment, we could get the stock through to water, and if we remain here until the rainy season, in all human probability our provisions would be exhausted, and we should parish with starvation." Despite his pleas, nobody wanted to go on until they had located potable water, so six men agreed to undertake a search in hopes that Savedra had overlooked a closer source. Two days later, a man returned to camp and reported that a spring had been found 15 miles (24 km) west, but its supply was so sparse that it could not meet the needs of the entire wagon train at once. After a thorough debate it was decided that, despite stern warnings from Army officers in Albuquerque against splitting into smaller groups, the best course of action was to divide the train in two and water their stock separately.

Udell recorded that on August 1, the Rose company ventured west without the Baley company, who waited one full day before starting out from Leroux Springs. In the meantime, the search party had located enough springs to sustain them for the next 50 miles (80 km). Several days later, the party reached their last known source of water, and Savedra informed them that there was not another for 60 miles (97 km). Because that was too long for their animals to travel without water, the party decided to backtrack approximately 26 miles (42 km) to the location of the last reliable supply at Cataract Creek. Udell again protested to no avail, recording in his journal that night: "Had there been a road that I could have traveled without a guide, I should have gone on and risked the consequences." Having trekked 52 miles (84 km) without clean water, the party's stock had grown extremely thirsty. The supply at Cataract Canyon was limited, and it contained what Udell called "wigglers"; however, they had no choice but to drink from, and allow their animals to drink from, the less than ideal source. By August 9, the Rose–Baley Party had begun to lose confidence in Savedra's ability to find water, and had been forced to do their own scouting for the precious resource. They had taken to building casks out of pine in hopes that they could gather enough in containers to last them until the next acceptable supply. Udell wrote, "Our water still holds out ... like the widow's cruse of oil, and tastes more pleasant, having been stirred up so often for us."

On August 13, Udell noted that the area received a substantial rainfall that marginally eased the Rose–Baley Party's concerns regarding the scarcity of water in the region. Later that evening, the men who had been searching for it during the last five days returned to camp and reported that they had found an acceptable source 40 miles (64 km) distant and another 80 miles (130 km) away. The emigrants spent the next morning filling casks and preparing for travel; they left late that afternoon, and after having trekked continuously for nearly twenty-four hours arrived at Partridge Creek the next day. That night a thunderstorm filled the creek with rainwater, further easing their concerns; however, after traveling 20 miles (32 km) the following day, they realized that the recent rainfalls has not reached that far, forcing them to make a dry camp on August 17.

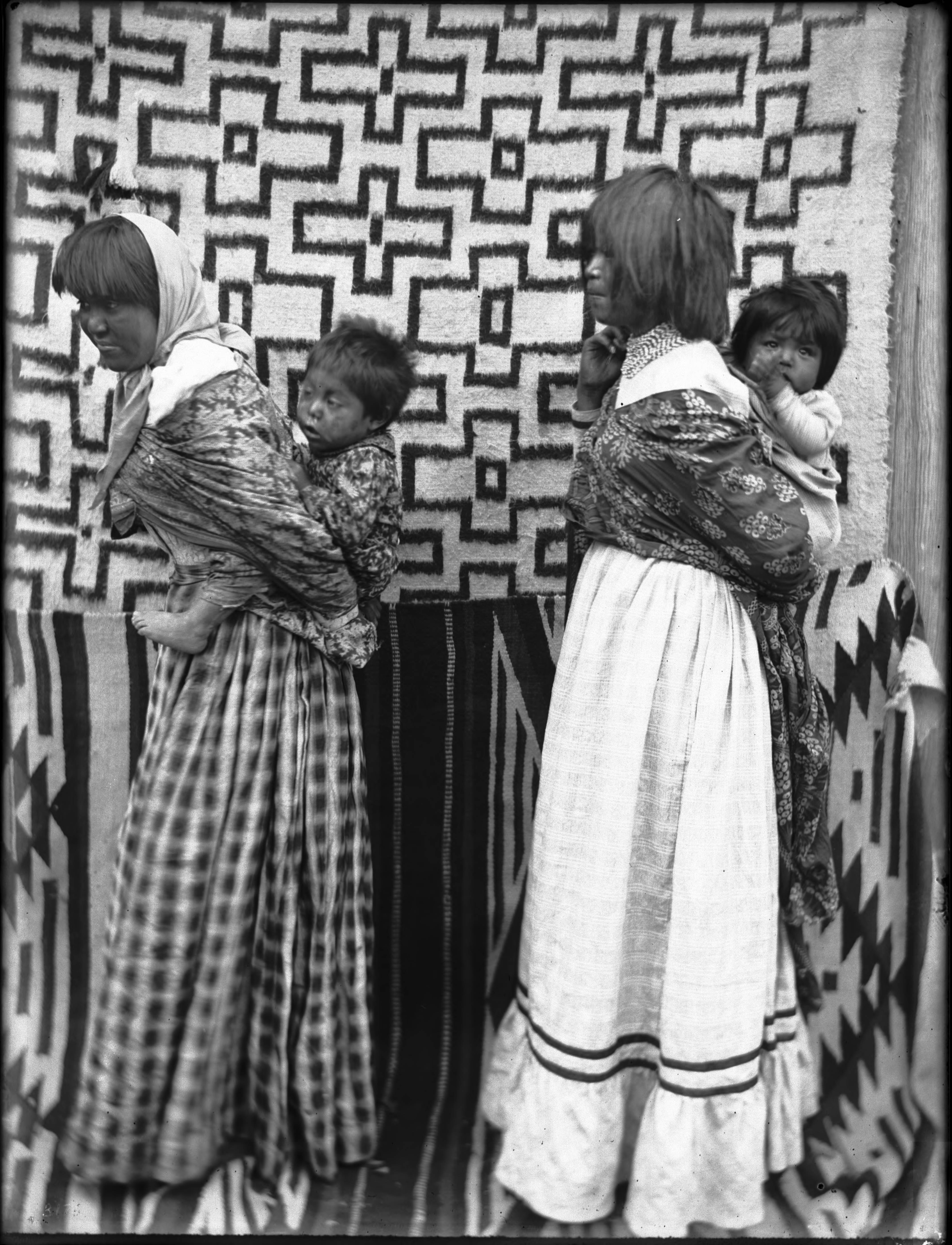
Two Hualapai mothers with children on their backs, Hackbury, Arizona, c. 1900

On August 18, after having traveled the last 85 miles (137 km) without reliable grass or water, the Rose–Baley Party located a field and a spring that were sufficient to satisfy their stock. That night, despite posting round-the-clock guards, a mare and a mule went missing, and three searchers were sent to find them. They tracked the animals to a deep canyon, where Native Americans hiding in the rocks shot arrows at them. Savedra noticed the Natives watching the party from the nearby foothills the following day, and was able to draw them into camp using sign language. In Baley's opinion, the Natives were most likely Hualapai. They could speak a few words of Spanish and English, and Savedra was able to communicate with them using their dialect and sign language (likely Plains Indian Sign Language). They admitted to having the group's missing animals, but insisted that the Mohave had stolen them. They repeatedly thumped their chest while uttering, "Hanna, Hanna", meaning "good" Native, insisting that the Mohave were "bad" Natives.

According to Rose, Savedra knew that the Mohave rarely ventured this far from their homelands, so they assumed the Hualapai had taken the animals, which were returned the following morning as the party camped at Peach Springs. The animals were led back by twenty-five Natives hoping for compensation in return, as Udell explained: "It was soon evident that they expected very extravagant rewards, all expecting shoes, clothing, and trinkets, besides some cattle ... many remained in camp with us that night, doubtless for the purpose of stealing, but the guard kept so sharp a lookout that they found no opportunity." On August 20, the party awoke to another fifty Hualapai anticipating gifts in exchange for the return of the stolen animals. The Natives left around noon, after receiving tobacco, trinkets, and food, but the emigrants noticed that six oxen were missing. A search team located four carcasses that had been stripped of their flesh; the other two animals were found nearby, having been recently killed, but not yet butchered. That night, the Rose–Baley Party decided to once again split their wagon train in response to the scarcity of water. According to Baley, as they journeyed from their campsite at Peach Springs to the Colorado River more than 100 miles (160 km) away, they were almost continuously harassed by Natives, who sent arrows flying into their wagon train during the day and raided their camp at night.

== Colorado River ==
Udell recorded that in the late afternoon of August 27, 1858, the Rose–Baley Party reached the Black Mountains. They made their crossing at Sitgreaves Pass, elevation 3,652 feet and named after Lieutenant Lorenzo Sitgreaves, who led an expedition party to the region in 1851. From the crest they could see the Colorado River in the distance. Having traveled all night and worked continuously during the morning and afternoon, the Rose–Baley Party stopped to prepare their first meal of the day. Soon afterward, a small group of Mohave warriors approached and asked, in a combination of broken English and Spanish, how many people their wagon train included and whether they intended to permanently settle near the Colorado River. The Mohave, who appeared friendly and had brought with them corn and melons, which they sold to the emigrants, were promised that the wagon train planned to travel through the region en route to their intended destination in Southern California. This seemed to appease the Natives, many of whom helped the party during their descent down the western slope of the Black Mountains to the Colorado River below. The emigrants were now entering Mohave country, near present-day Needles, California.

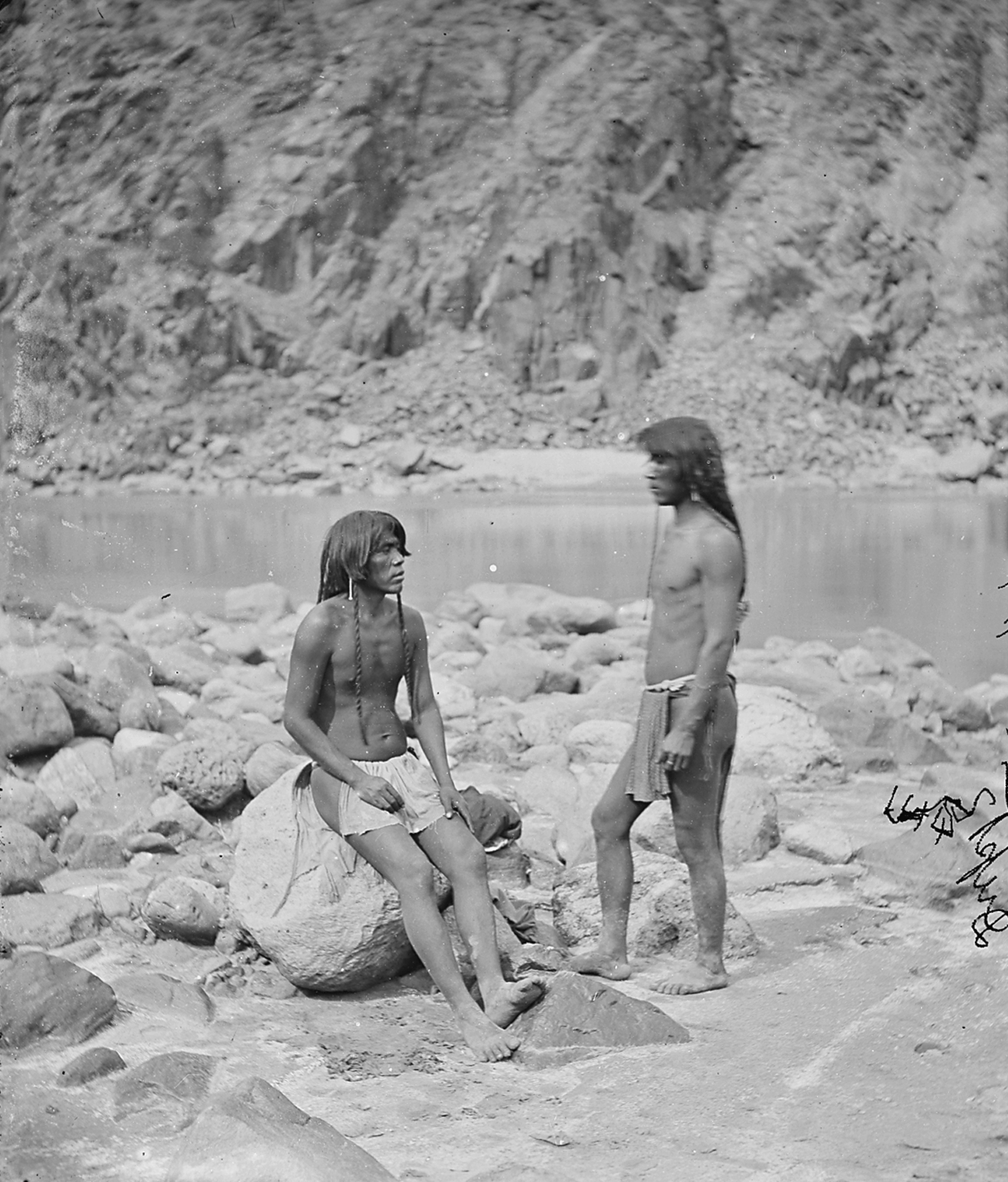
Two Mohave men next to the Colorado River, 1871

By midnight, the Baley company had fallen behind the Rose company and decided to stop and make a mountain camp while Rose and others continued to the Colorado River, where they planned to water their combined stock and build a raft in preparation for the impending river crossing. By noon on August 28, Rose had reached a patch of cottonwood trees about one mile from the river, where their oxen were unhitched and allowed to join the loose stock racing towards the water. There the emigrants encountered more Mohave, but unlike the friendly ones that greeted them at Sitgreaves Pass, these were rude and hostile. After a thorough watering, the work oxen were returned to the wagons. Rose and his wife, Amanda, decided to scout the river bank for a suitable campsite, exiting their wagon to make the journey by foot. Moments later, an aggressive Mohave placed his hand on her shoulder and bosom, and she ran back, terrified, to the relative safety of their wagon. Rose, not wanting to incite the Mohave, ignored the incident and continued to the river. Other Mohave harassed Alpha Brown's family, briefly threatening to take his wife's dress and abduct their son. That danger was averted, but many Mohave set about driving off and slaughtering several of the party's cattle before leaving the emigrants alone at their encampment, some two hundred yards from the river and 10 miles (16 km) away from the Baley company's mountain camp.

The following morning, they moved their camp to the river bank to facilitate easier watering of their stock. They were visited around noon by twenty-five warriors and a Mohave sub-chief, who heard their complaints about the killing of their livestock and assured them that no further depredations would occur, and that they could cross the Colorado as they pleased. About one hour later, another chief and several warriors approached the camp; after receiving gifts, they also left without incident. According to Rose, upon hearing of the emigrants plans the chief gave them, "a very searching look, as if not half believing it". By noon, the party had moved their camp still closer to where they planned to cross, about a mile downriver near a patch of cottonwood trees that were suitable for building rafts.

== Mohave attack ==
According to Baley, at approximately 2 p.m. on August 30, 1858, the emigrants camped near the Colorado River heard Alpha Brown's step-daughter, Sallie Fox, screaming. She had been playing in a wagon when she noticed several Mohave nearby. Having lost the element of surprise, three hundred warriors then let out war whoops as they shot arrows into the camp, mortally wounding Rose's foreman, Alpha Brown. Udell described the attack as "like a shower" of arrows. According to Rose, "I have no doubt they expected to massacre us. But we were well armed and the men that were in camp ready to receive them." As the men mounted a defense, the women ran with their children to the covered wagons. Both Udell and Rose stated that the fighting lasted for approximately two hours. Baley explains that when a Mohave chief who appeared to be leading the attack stepped out in front of his warriors and taunted the emigrants, Gillum Baley, a veteran of the Black Hawk War and a noted marksman, took him down with a single rifle shot. The Mohave warriors then retrieved the chief's body and retreated from the battle. Later historians have questioned whether Mojaves were fully responsible for the attack, and if Hualapais had also taken part in the attack, following the account of Lieutenant Colonel William Hoffman.

According to Udell, eight members of the Rose-Baley party had been killed and thirteen wounded. Rose stated that of the train's livestock, only ten horses and seventeen cattle remained. Baley notes that in addition to the killing of Alpha Brown, all seven members of the Bentner family, including five children, were massacred while traveling unaccompanied from Baley's mountain camp to Rose's river camp. (Note: According to Baley, when the Bentner family wagon was located, the eldest daughter's naked body was found nearby; her face had been mutilated. The other Bentners were never found; however, Mohave warriors had taunted the emigrants near the river with a long pole with several scalps attached, which the Rose-Baley Party assumed had come from the Bentners.) However subsequent investigations showed that the Bentners had been attacked by a group of Hualapais, including seven renegade Mohave warriors. The emigrants killed approximately seventeen Mohave warriors. In the opinion of the cultural anthropologist Alfred L. Kroeber, "the event sealed the fate of the Mohave as an independent people." In 1859, the US military established Fort Mohave near the location of the battle at Beale's Crossing.

== Aftermath ==
When the battle had ended, and the Mohave retreated, the Rose company gathered to discuss their options. Being low on ammunition and manpower, the emigrants were not confident in their ability to hold off another attack. So, although San Bernardino, at about 170 miles (270 km) away was much closer, they unanimously decided to backtrack the nearly 500 miles (800 km) to Albuquerque. Because they were dangerously low on supplies, their successful return to Albuquerque was partly contingent upon finding assistance from west-bound emigrants. Before beginning the return trip, they wrapped Alpha Brown's body in chains and committed it to the Colorado River. With only one remaining wagon and the ambulance, they decided which items they could carry and which they should abandon. Those who were able rode horses, and the rest walked.

This day all who were left alive of Mr. Rose's party came into camp, bringing melancholy intelligence.

— Udell's journal, August 31, 1858

At approximately 6 p.m., with the wounded in one wagon, the children in the ambulance, and the healthy adults on foot, the Rose company began the difficult journey back to Albuquerque, during which, according to the author Arthur Woodward, they observed a fiery comet that further upset the already frightened children. By 10 p.m. the party began to hear war whoops and the clanging of pots and pans coming from the direction of the Colorado River. Baley suggests that the Mohave had returned to "finish them off", but after finding a large cache of supplies celebrated their windfall, which included Rose's eight-dollar-a-bottle brandy. In Baley's opinion, the newfound spoils were likely the only reason the Mohave did not follow the fleeing wagon train, now en route to rendezvous with the Baley company at their mountain camp.

== Bibliography ==
- Baley, Charles W. (2002). Disaster at the Colorado: Beale's Wagon Road and the First Emigrant Party. Logan: Utah State University Press. ISBN 978-0874214376. "Free Download Full Text"
- Beale, Edward Fitzgerald (1858). Wagon Road from Fort Defiance to the Colorado River: Letter from the Secretary of War, Transmitting the Report of the Superintendent of the Wagon Road from Fort Defiance to the Colorado River: Issue 124 of [U.S.] 35th Cong., 1st sess. House. Ex. doc. [U.S.] 35th Cong., 1st sess. House. Ex. Doc.no. 124. Harvard University.
- Belden, L. Burr (December 9, 1951). "History in the Making: Mohave Massacre of Wagon Train brings War, Fort". The San Bernardino County Sun.
- Bonsal, Stephen (1912) [1901]. Edward Fitzgerald Beale, a pioneer in the path of empire, 1822–1903. G. P. Putnam's sons. OCLC 706481.
- Cheney, J.W. (1915). "The Story of An Emigrant Train". The Annals of Iowa. 12 (2): 82–97. doi:10.17077/0003-4827.4029.
- Groom, Winston (2011). Kearny's March: The Epic Creation of the American West, 1846–1847. Knopf Doubleday Publishing Group. ISBN 978-0307701411.
- Hinckley, Jim (2012). The Route 66 Encyclopedia. MBI Publishing Company. ISBN 978-1610586887.
- Kroeber, A.L.; Kroeber, C.B. (1973). A Mohave War Reminiscence, 1854–1880. Dover Publications. ISBN 978-0486281636.
- Lutzick, Ann-Mary J. (2013). Winslow: Images of America. Arcadia Publishing. ISBN 978-0738596525.
- Ricky, Donald B. (1999). Indians of Arizona: Past and Present. North American Book Distributors. ISBN 978-0403098637.
- Rose, Leonard John (1941). "Massacre on the Colorado". In Cleland, Robert Glass (ed.). The cattle on a thousand hills; Southern California, 1850–1870. Huntington Library Publications. San Marino, California: The Huntington Library. pp. 306–315. Reprint of Rose's letter published in the Missouri Republican on November 29, 1859.
- Shepherd, Jeffrey P. (2010). We are an Indian Nation: A History of the Hualapai People. University of Arizona Press. ISBN 978-0816529049.
- Thrapp, Dan L. (1991). Encyclopedia of Frontier Biography: A–F. University of Nebraska Press. ISBN 978-0803294189.
- Udell, John (1946). "John Udell Journal, kept during a trip across the plains, containing account of the massacre of a portion of his party by the Mojave Indians in 1859". The University of California. N.A. Kovach.
- Utley, Robert Marshall (1981). Frontiersmen in Blue: The United States Army and the Indian, 1848–1865. University of Nebraska Press. ISBN 978-0803295506.
- Welsh, Liz; Welsh, Peter (2000). Rock-Art of the Southwest: A Visitor's Companion. Wilderness Press. ISBN 978-0899976006.
- Woodward, Arthur (January 1953). "Irataba: Chief of the Mohave". Plateau. 25 (3). Northern Arizona Society of Science and Art; Museum of Northern Arizona.
- Zappia, Natale A. (2014). Traders and Raiders: The Indigenous World of the Colorado Basin, 1540–1859. University of North Carolina Press. ISBN 978-1469615851.
