= Gillum =

Gillum is both a surname and a given name. Notable people with the name include:

== Surname ==
- Andrew Gillum (born 1979), American politician of the Democratic Party who served as the mayor of Tallahassee until 2018
- Gerald Earl Gillum (born 1989), better known by his stage name G-Eazy, American rapper and record producer from Oakland, California
- Jazz Gillum (1902 or 1904–1966), American blues harmonica player
- Vern Gillum, American television director

== Given name ==
- Gillum Baley (1813–1895), American pioneer and judge
