= El Morro National Monument =

National monument in New Mexico, United States

- IUCN category III (natural monument or feature)
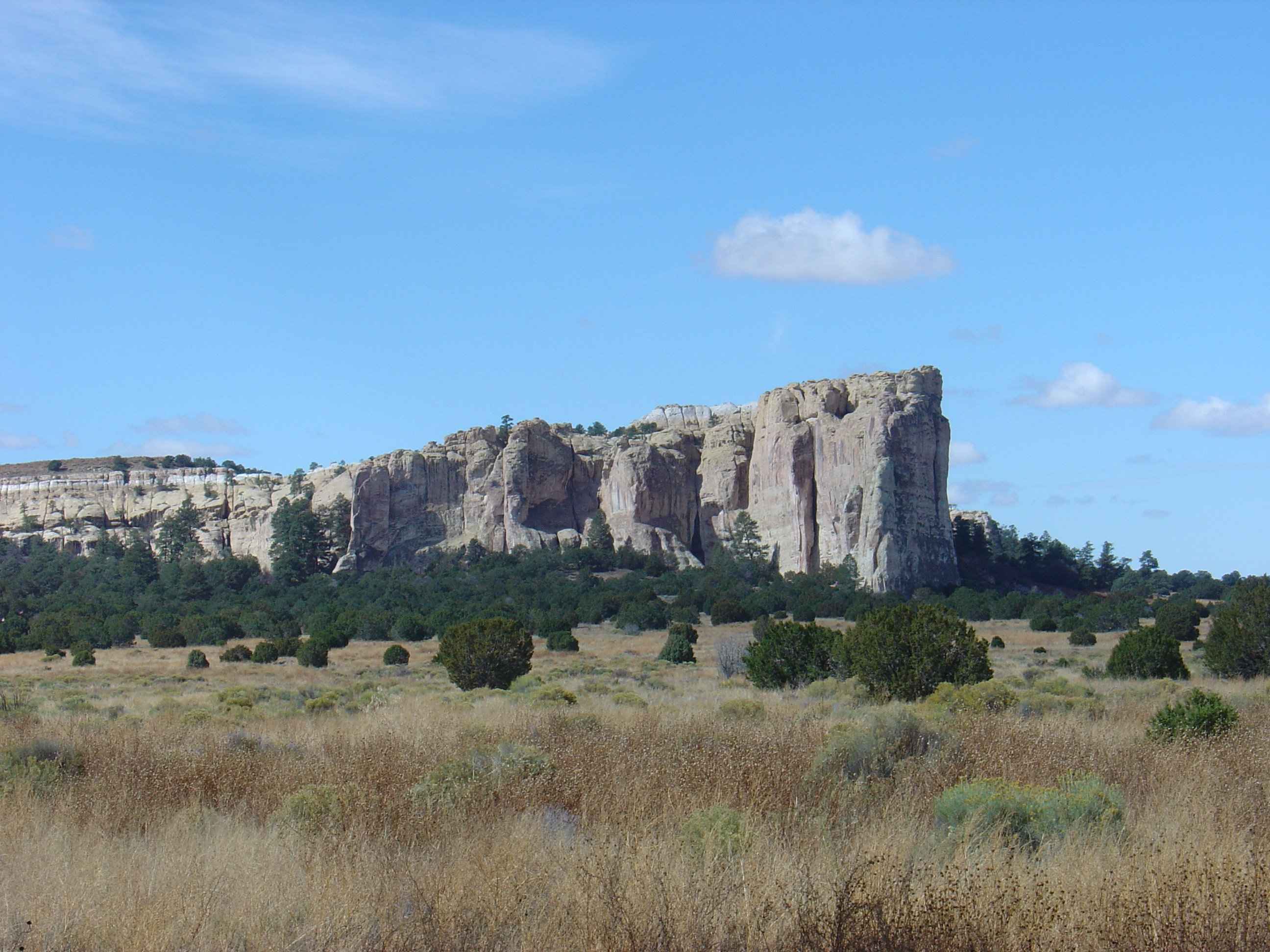

- Location within New Mexico Location within the United States
- Location: Cibola County, New Mexico, USA
- Nearest city: El Morro, New Mexico
- Coordinates: 35°2′18″N 108°21′12″W
- Area: 1,278.72 acres (5.1748 km^{2}); 1,039.92 acres (420.84 ha) federal
- Created: December 8, 1906
- Visitors: 48,797 (in 2025)
- Governing body: National Park Service
- Website: El Morro National Monument
- El Morro National Monument
- U.S. National Register of Historic Places
- U.S. Historic district
- NM State Register of Cultural Properties
- Area: 221 acres (89 ha)
- NRHP reference No.: 66000043
- NMSRCP No.: 59

Significant dates
- Added to NRHP: October 15, 1966
- Designated NMSRCP: May 21, 1971

El Morro National Monument is a U.S. national monument in Cibola County, New Mexico, United States. Located on an ancient east–west trail in the western part of the state, the monument preserves the remains of a large prehistoric pueblo atop a great sandstone promontory with a pool of water at its base, which subsequently became a landmark where over the centuries explorers and travelers have left personal inscriptions that survive today.

Between about 1275 to 1350 AD, up to 600 people of the Ancestral Puebloan culture lived in the 355+-room mesa-top pueblo. The village was situated on the old Zuni-Acoma Trail, an important ancient trade route. Spanish explorers visiting the area in the 16th century referred to the notable promontory as El Morro ("The Headland"); the local Zuni people call it A'ts'ina ("Place of writings on the rock"), and early Anglo-Americans referred to it as Inscription Rock.

With its oasis-like source of water, El Morro served as a natural resting place for numerous travelers through the otherwise arid and desolate region, many of whom left their signatures, names, dates, poems, and stories of their treks in the walls of the sandstone cliff. While some of the inscriptions are now faded through age, there are still many that can be seen today and remain legible, with some dating back to the 17th century. The oldest legible inscription at El Morro, left by Juan de Oñate, the first Spanish governor of the colony of Santa Fe de Nuevo México, is dated April 16, 1605. Among the Anglo-American emigrants who left their names there in 1858 were several members of the Rose-Baley Party, including Leonard Rose and John Udell. Nearby petroglyphs and carvings made by the Ancestral Puebloans were inscribed centuries before Europeans arrived. In 1906, U.S. federal law prohibited further carving on the cliffs.

El Morro was designated a national monument by President Theodore Roosevelt on December 8, 1906, and was added to the National Register of Historic Places in 1966. Today the site is managed by the National Park Service. The many inscription panels, water pool, pueblo ruins, and the top of the promontory are all accessible via park trails. El Morro is one of many prehistoric sites on the Trails of the Ancients Byway, a designated New Mexico Scenic Byway. The monument was featured in the film Four Faces West (1948), starring Joel McCrea. In December 2019, the International Dark Sky Association certified El Morro as an International Dark Sky Park, recognizing its preservation of not only the historic inscriptions but also its natural night sky.

== Gallery ==
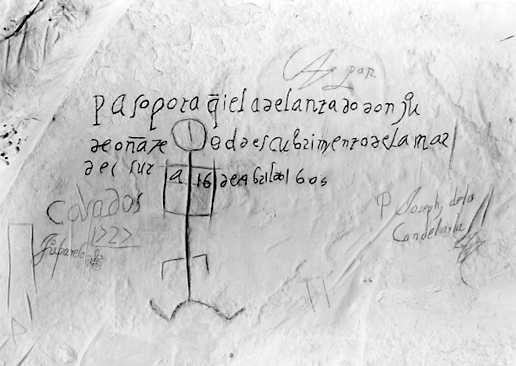
Inscription by Juan de Oñate in 1605. This is the oldest historical inscription at El Morro.

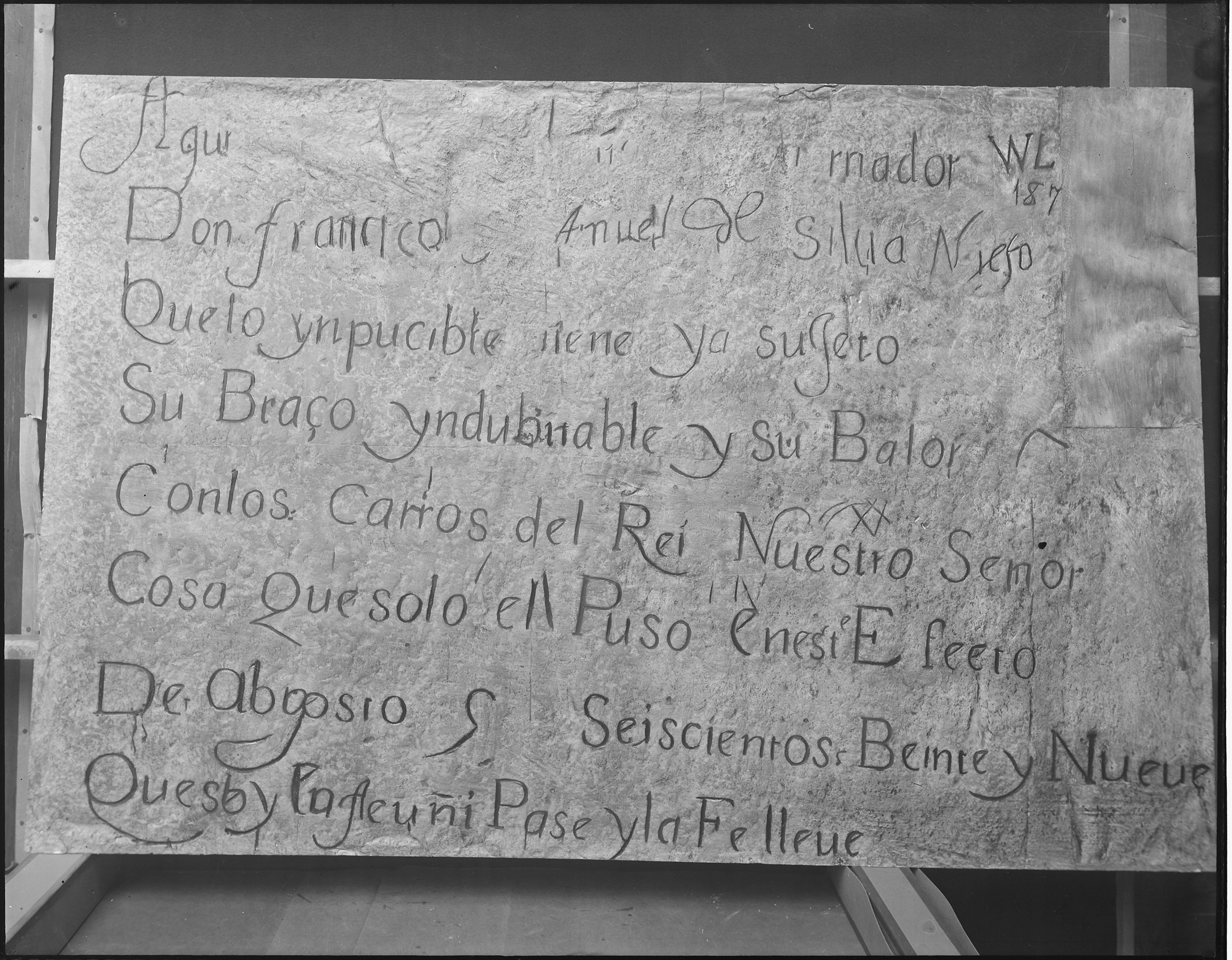
Inscription recording a 1629 expedition by Francisco Manuel de Silva Nieto

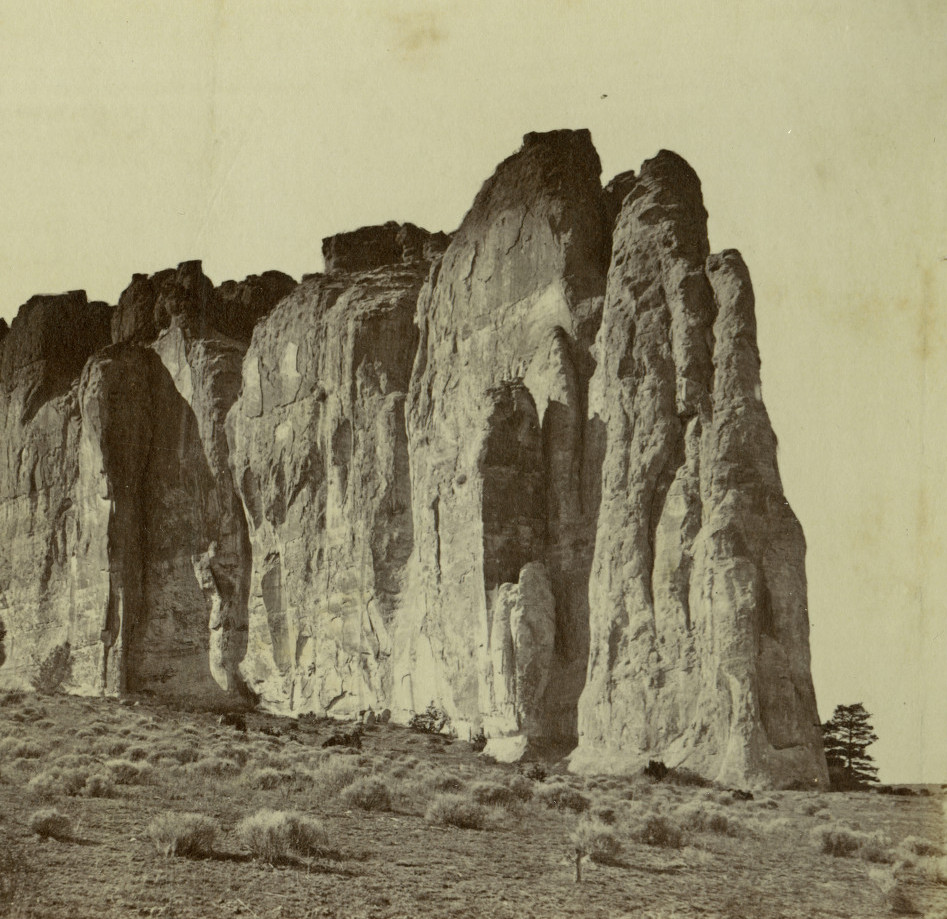
El Morro in 1868, photographed by Alexander Gardner

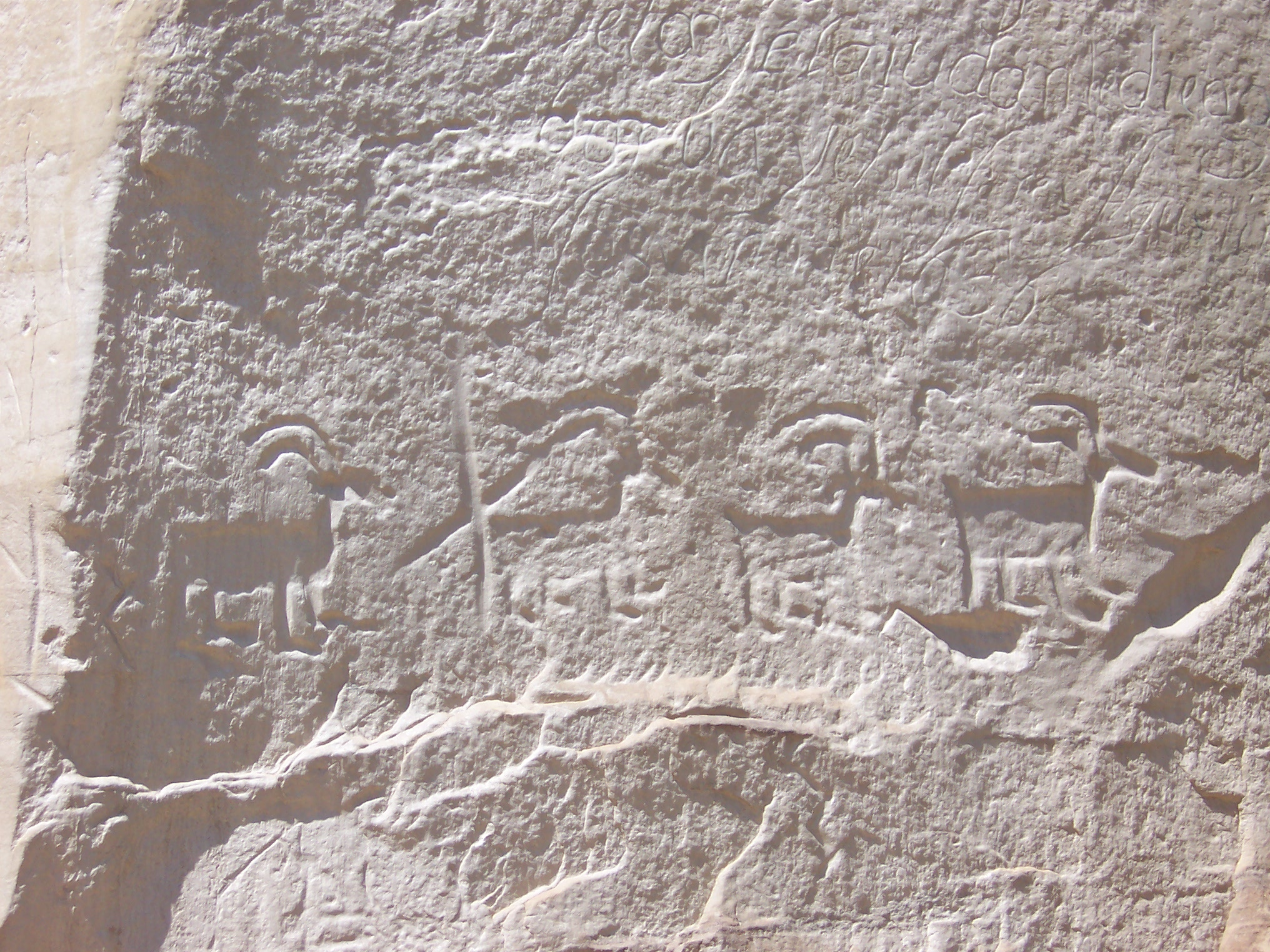
Native American petroglyph

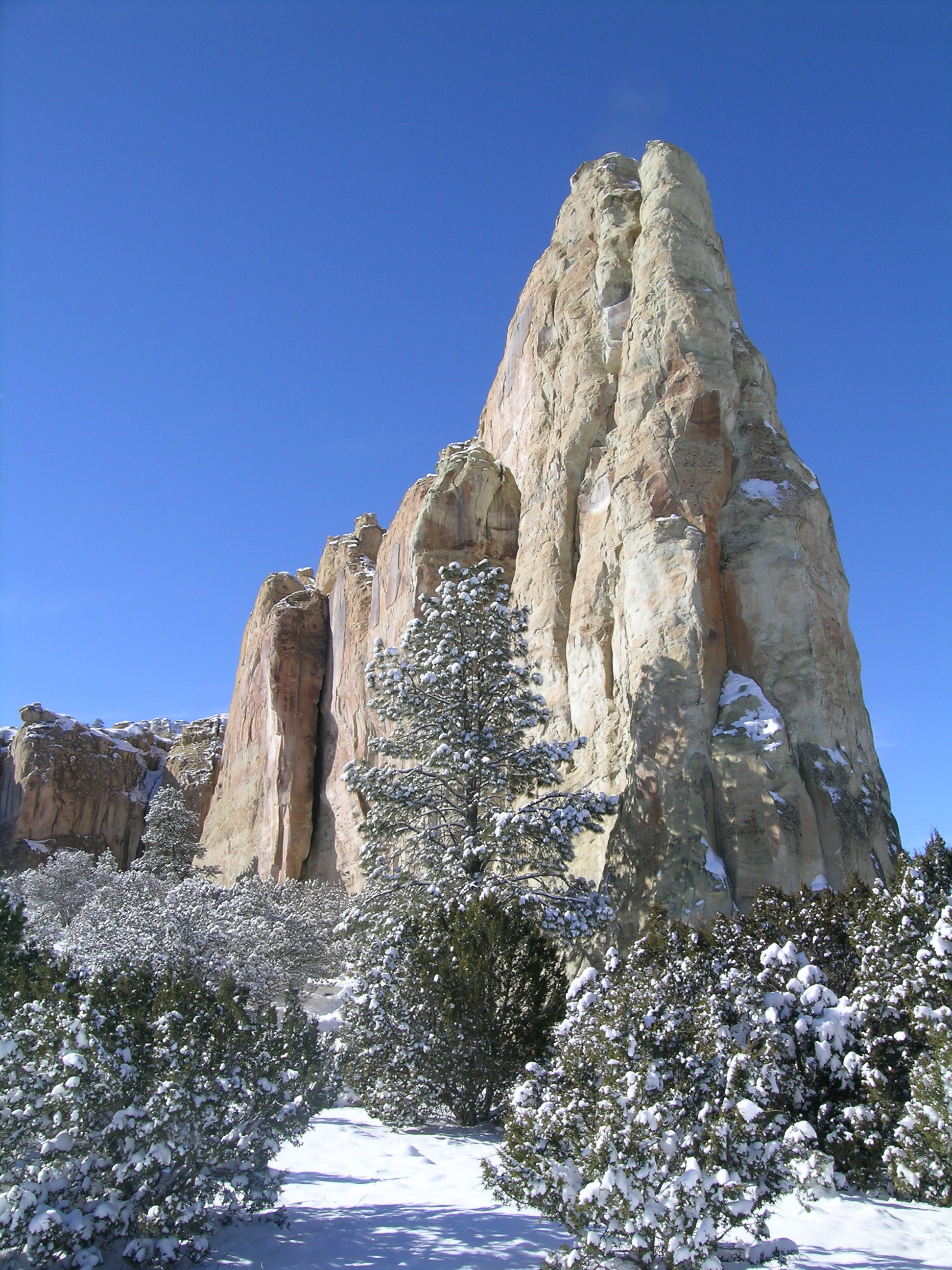
Sandstone bluff at El Morro

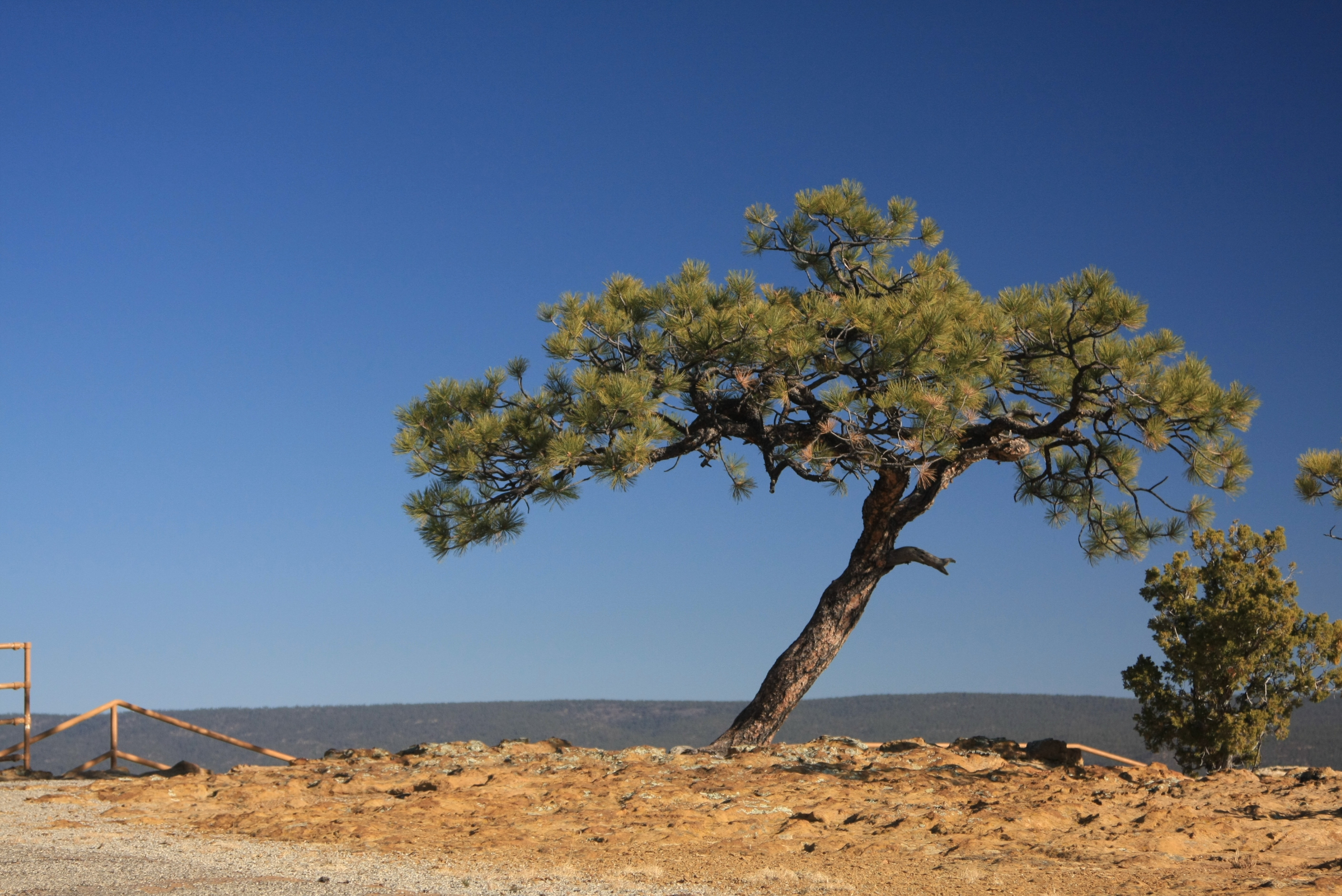
Ponderosa pine along Mesa Top trail loop

== Climate ==
According to the Köppen Climate Classification system, El Morro National Monument has an oceanic climate, abbreviated "Cfb" on climate maps. The hottest temperature recorded at El Morro National Monument was 100 °F (37.8 °C) on June 28, 1953, while the coldest temperature recorded was −38 °F (−38.9 °C) on January 13, 1963.

Climate data for El Morro National Monument, New Mexico, 1991–2020 normals, extremes 1938–present
Month	Jan	Feb	Mar	Apr	May	Jun	Jul	Aug	Sep	Oct	Nov	Dec	Year
Record high °F (°C)	68 (20)	72 (22)	84 (29)	87 (31)	93 (34)	100 (38)	98 (37)	98 (37)	94 (34)	87 (31)	78 (26)	69 (21)	100 (38)
Mean daily maximum °F (°C)	43.7 (6.5)	47.4 (8.6)	55.3 (12.9)	63.6 (17.6)	72.3 (22.4)	83.3 (28.5)	84.6 (29.2)	81.8 (27.7)	76.8 (24.9)	66.2 (19.0)	53.9 (12.2)	44.4 (6.9)	64.4 (18.0)
Daily mean °F (°C)	28.8 (−1.8)	33.1 (0.6)	39.3 (4.1)	45.6 (7.6)	53.4 (11.9)	63.1 (17.3)	68.0 (20.0)	66.0 (18.9)	59.9 (15.5)	48.7 (9.3)	37.6 (3.1)	29.4 (−1.4)	47.7 (8.8)
Mean daily minimum °F (°C)	13.9 (−10.1)	18.9 (−7.3)	23.2 (−4.9)	27.5 (−2.5)	34.5 (1.4)	42.9 (6.1)	51.4 (10.8)	50.3 (10.2)	43.1 (6.2)	31.1 (−0.5)	21.2 (−6.0)	14.4 (−9.8)	31.0 (−0.5)
Record low °F (°C)	−38 (−39)	−23 (−31)	−15 (−26)	3 (−16)	12 (−11)	23 (−5)	34 (1)	33 (1)	21 (−6)	−5 (−21)	−23 (−31)	−31 (−35)	−38 (−39)
Average precipitation inches (mm)	0.97 (25)	0.82 (21)	1.01 (26)	0.69 (18)	0.73 (19)	0.50 (13)	2.27 (58)	2.69 (68)	1.41 (36)	1.01 (26)	0.82 (21)	0.99 (25)	13.91 (356)
Average snowfall inches (cm)	11.0 (28)	7.4 (19)	5.4 (14)	2.1 (5.3)	0.4 (1.0)	0.0 (0.0)	0.0 (0.0)	0.0 (0.0)	0.0 (0.0)	1.7 (4.3)	4.1 (10)	5.9 (15)	38.0 (97)
Average precipitation days (≥ 0.01 in)	6.2	6.1	5.3	4.3	4.2	3.8	12.5	13.1	7.6	5.7	4.7	5.9	79.4
Average snowy days (≥ 0.1 in)	4.9	4.3	2.9	1.7	0.4	0.0	0.0	0.0	0.0	0.6	2.1	4.4	21.3
Source 1: NOAA
Source 2: xmACIS2

== See also ==
- National Register of Historic Places listings in Cibola County, New Mexico
- List of national monuments of the United States
