= Bailey Flats, California =

Bailey Flats
- Former settlement
- Location in California
- Coordinates: 37°20′35″N 119°48′44″W
- Country: United States
- State: California
- County: Madera
- Elevation: 1,047 ft (319 m)

Bailey Flats (also, Baley Flats and Mist) is a former settlement in Madera County, California, United States. It was located 10 miles (16 km) north-northeast of Raymond, at an elevation of 1047 feet (319 m).

The Mist post office operated from 1913 to 1935.
