= Edward O. Smith =

American politician (1817 - 1892)

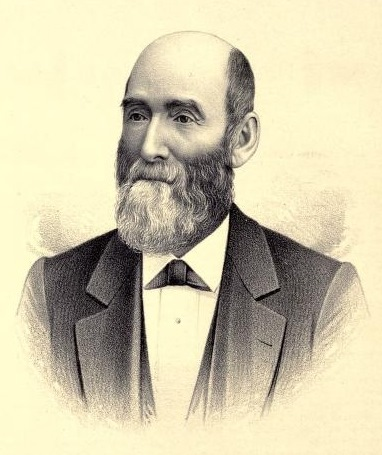
- Born: Edward Owen Smith; 15 April 1817; Montgomery County, Maryland, U.S.
- Died: 8 March 1892 (aged 74); San Jose, California, U.S.
- Other name: E.O. Smith
- Known for: Mayor of Decatur, Illinois; Illinois State Senator

Edward Owen Smith (15 April 1817 – 8 March 1892) was an American pioneer, businessman and politician. He served as the mayor of Decatur, Illinois, an Illinois State Senator, and as a member of both the 1848 Illinois Constitutional Convention and the 1878 California Constitutional Convention.

== See also ==
- List of mayors of Decatur, Illinois
