= Leonard John Rose =

American politician (1827–1899)

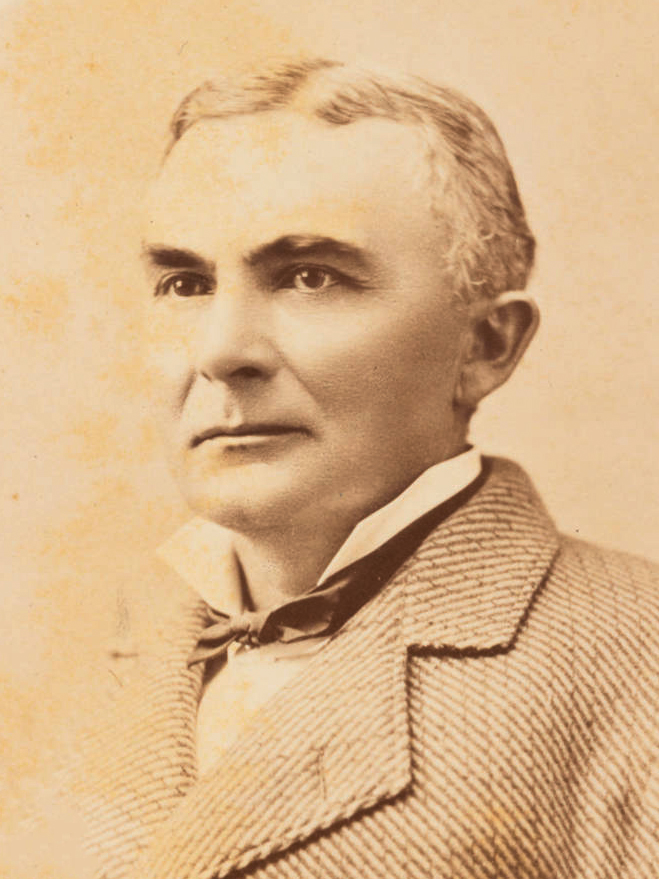
- Portrait of Rose by Carleton E Watkins, c. 1880

Member of the California Senate from the 39th district
- In office January 3, 1887 – January 7, 1889
- Preceded by: District created
- Succeeded by: Joseph E. McComas

Personal details
- Born: 1827 Bavaria, Germany
- Died: May 17, 1899 Los Angeles, California, U.S.
- Party: Democratic
- Spouse: Amanda Jones (after 1851)
- Children: 9
- Known for: American pioneer, viticulturist, and California State Senator

Leonard John Rose (1827 – May 17, 1899) was a California pioneer and politician who served in the California State Senate. He was one of the leaders of the ill-fated Rose-Baley Party, the first emigrant wagon train to attempt the journey from New Mexico to California via Beale's Wagon Road. Rose is the namesake of Rosemead, California.

== Life and career ==
Rose was born in the Kingdom of Bavaria, in 1827. His parents came to the United States when he was 12 years old. He spent his youth and received his education in Illinois. In 1848, he moved to Keosauqua, Iowa where he became a wealthy merchant. In April 1858, with 200 head of fine cattle and 50 horses, he set out, with 19 other young men, for California by the 35th parallel route. While traveling through Kansas, the Rose company merged with one led by Gillum Baley, forming the Rose-Baley Party. After suffering immense hardships, including "attacks by hostile Indians" according to the 1898 historical society, and a 500-mile trek back Albuquerque, New Mexico with the other survivors of the Indian attack, Rose and his family went to Santa Fe where they stayed for two years running an inn called La Fonda. They continued their journey, by way of the Butterfield Stage Route, reaching Los Angeles in November, 1860.

Rose's record and great success as a vineyardist and orchardist on a large scale, and as a raiser of fine stock, was well known. Early American settlers in Los Angeles gravitated to the moist lands on which corn could be raised without irrigation. But Rose, following the example of Don Benito Wilson and one or two others, went to the foothills, where abundant water could be saved or developed, before it sank into the plains, and where heavy frosts were unknown, and demonstrated on a "magnificent scale" the possibilities of the citrus and grape industries on those foothills lands at that time. Rose served Los Angeles county as state senator for the term commencing in 1887, and also as a member of the State Viticultural Society, and of the State Board of Agriculture.

A series of bad investments in California and Nevada between 1887 and 1897 led to his financial ruin. He committed suicide at his home in Los Angeles at the age of 72. Rose was survived by wife Amanda nee Jones whom he had married in 1851 and eight of their sons and daughters. Their son Guy Rose was a well-known Impressionist landscape painter.
