= Beale's Wagon Road =

Historic early American road

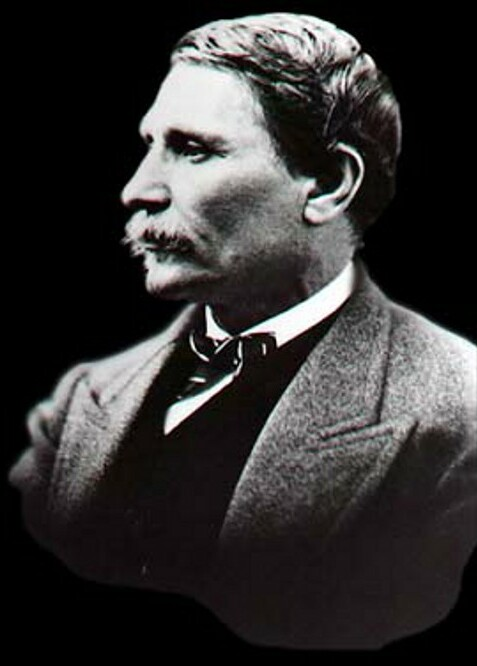
Edward Fitzgerald Beale (1822−1893)

In 1857, an expedition led by Edward Fitzgerald Beale was tasked with establishing a trade route along the 35th parallel from Fort Smith, Arkansas to Los Angeles, California.

The wagon trail began at Fort Smith and continued through Indian Territory, New Mexico Territory to Fort Defiance. He then continued west over what is now northern Arizona to Beale Spring near modern Kingman and Sitgreaves Pass before crossing the Colorado River. The location where Beale crossed the river from Arizona to California, up river from present-day Needles, California, became known as Beale's Crossing. Beale's route continued west through Southern California from where Beale's road crossed the Colorado River, through the Mojave Desert along the routes of the Mojave Trail, and Old Spanish Trail to the Mojave River where it crossed the Mormon Road that led to Los Angeles, then crossed the western Mojave Desert to Fort Tejon and the Stockton–Los Angeles Road, and the less-traveled El Camino Viejo, both of which led to the northern parts of California through the San Joaquin Valley.

== Background ==
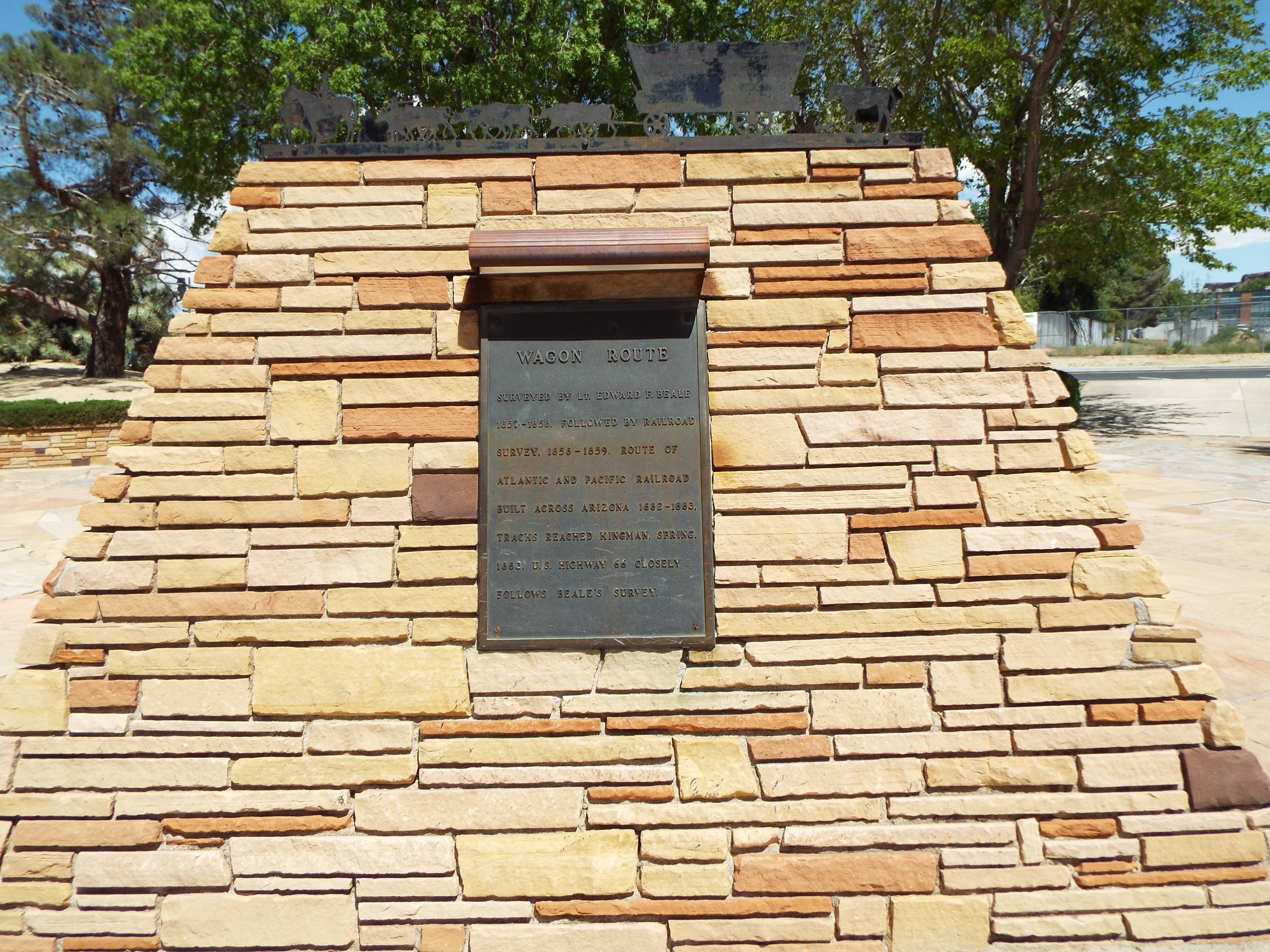
Beale Wagon Road Marker in Kingman

Beale described the route, "It is the shortest from our western frontier by 300 miles (480 km), being nearly directly west. It is the most level: our wagons only double-teaming once in the entire distance, and that at a short hill, and over a surface heretofore unbroken by wheels or trail on any kind. It is well-watered: our greatest distance without water at any time being 20 miles (32 km). It is well-timbered, and in many places the growth is far beyond that of any part of the world I have ever seen. It is temperate in climate, passing for the most part over an elevated region. It is salubrious: not one of our party requiring the slightest medical attendance from the time of our leaving to our arrival ... It crosses the great desert (which must be crossed by any road to California) at its narrowest point." Beale's Wagon Road would eventually be supplanted by the railroad in the early 1880s, then U.S. Route 66 in 1926, and Interstate 40 in 1978.

=== Beale's recommendations ===
After his initial survey of the road, E.F. Beale went to Washington, D.C. to make recommendations to members of Congress and the War Department:

I regard the establishment of a military post on the Colorado River as an indispensable necessity for the emigrant over this road; for although the Indians living in the rich meadow lands are agricultural, and consequently peaceable, they are very numerous, so much so that we counted 800 men around our camp on the second day after our arrival on the banks of the river. The temptation of scattered emigrant parties with their families, and the confusion of inexperienced teamsters, rafting so wide and rapid a river with their wagons and families, would offer too strong a temptation for the Indians to withstand.

Beale suggested that, in addition to a military fort, the route was also in immediate need of bridges and dams to ensure safe travel and provide a reliable water supply; he requested $100,000 to fund the improvements.
