= Beaver Lake (Nevada) =

Defunct lake in Nevada, United States

- Location in Nevada
- Location: Present-day Clark County, Nevada, U.S.
- Coordinates: 35°03′23″N 114°38′45″W
- Type: Lake

Beaver Lake was a lake on the west side of the Colorado River in what is now Clark County, Nevada. Beaver Lake lay on a north–south axis, almost entirely within the boundaries of the Camp Mohave Military Reservation. The southern end of the lake was a mile and half west of Fort Mohave and its northern end was located about 2 miles northwest of the camp. The Mojave Road passed by the northern extremity of the lake. Since 1892 the lake has dried up and have returned to desert or been made into farmland. It appears as a depression running north and south, west of the river at an elevation of 490 feet (150 m) or less.

== History ==
Beaver Lake was a length of a slough or a former channel of the Colorado River, cut off and isolated from the river sometime before 1858, when it featured as the site of the opening engagement in the Mohave War, when the camp of Lieutenant Colonel William Hoffman with 50 soldiers of the 6th Cavalry on the First Mohave Expedition was surrounded and attacked by Chief Cairook with about 300 Mohave men.

In the 1875 Topographical Sketch by 1st Lt. George M. Wheeler of the Colorado River it shows the upper part of Beaver Lake had become one of two channels of the Colorado River again.

The lake appears again intact with that name on a September 1911 reprint of a U. S. Geological Survey, Reconnaissance Map, Arizona, Nevada, California, Camp Mohave Sheet, Edition of March 1892, reprinted. The lake has since dried up, after being cut off from the spring flooding of the river, following the construction of the Hoover Dam.

== Today ==
A satellite view of the lake shows it has dried up, the middle part of the southern half of the old lake bed still appears as a narrow playa between strips of farmland. Above the Aha Macav Parkway that crosses the former lake at its middle, it appears that it was formerly farmland now returned to desert vegetation, except beyond Silver State Road, where the battle was fought, it appears undisturbed desert since the lake dried up. The southern extreme below the fields appears to be desert vegetation undisturbed since the lake dried up.
