= Mohave War =

Part of the American Indian Wars

- Part of the American Indian Wars
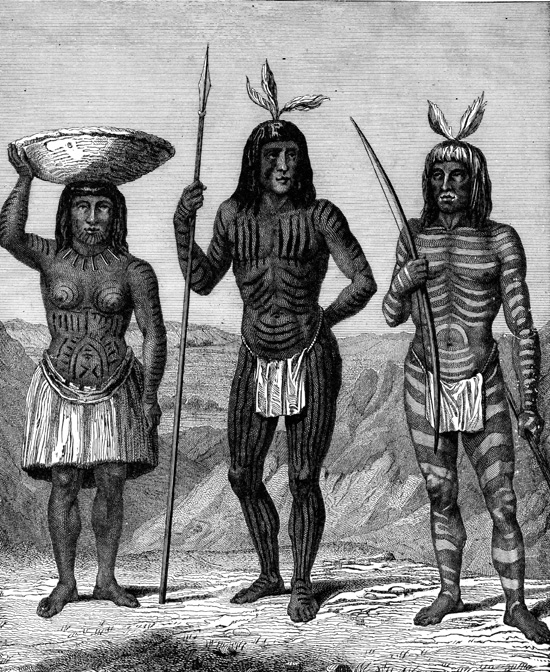
- Mohave Indians by H.B. Mollhansen, 1856
Date	1858–1859
Location	Arizona Territory
Result	United States victory

Belligerents
United States Maricopa	Mohave; Hualapai

Commanders and leaders
(United States) William Hoffman (United States) Lewis Addison Armistead (United States) Elisha Marshall (United States) Samuel A. Bishop Ahwantsevarih	Espaniole; Irataba; Cairook †; Sickahot

The Mohave War was an armed conflict between the Mohave people and the United States from 1858 to 1859. With the California Gold Rush of 1849, thousands of American settlers headed west through Mohave country and into California. The influx of migrants passing through, combined with simple misunderstandings, led to conflict. Fort Mohave on the Arizona side of the Colorado River was built for operations against the Mohave and was the second American military post established on the river after Fort Yuma. Eventually advantages in weaponry and tactics brought the Mohave and their allies to surrender. After the signing of a peace treaty in 1859, the Mohave no longer opposed the United States through warfare. The peace also ended a long guerrilla war between the Mohave and the Maricopa of south central Arizona.

== Battle of Beale's Crossing ==
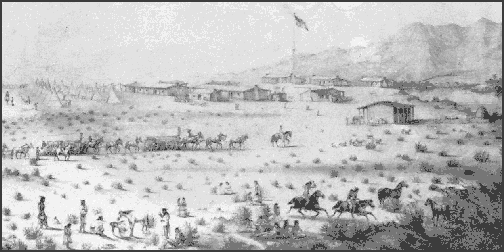
A sketch of Fort Mohave in the late 1800s

In 1857, President James Buchanan appointed Edward Fitzgerald Beale to survey and build a 1,000 mile (1,600 km) road from Fort Defiance in northern New Mexico Territory, to the Colorado River. The road was meant for immigrants, traveling to the California gold fields and crossed the Colorado at Beale's Crossing within Mohave territory. Beale's Crossing in 1857 was little more than a shallow point in the river until a party of emigrants known as the Rose-Baley Party arrived. The wagon train set out from Santa Fe and when they got to the Colorado, they made camp and built a dock for the construction of rafts to ferry the heavier wagon equipment across. Chiefs Irataba, Cairook and Sickahot approached the American settlers and in a pow wow the Mohave asked the party's leader, L. J. Rose if they intended to build a town along the river. Rose responded with no and informed the chiefs that they were headed for California and would only be staying for a short while.

Tension arose when the Mohave learned that the Bailey company would be coming through just after the Rose company, so they began stealing cattle for the meat. The Americans noticed that some of their herd had gone missing and when they caught the Mohaves in the act L. R. Rose confronted them, but the Mohave responded as though it was a joke. Also, near the American camp was a patch of cottonwood trees that belonged to the Mohave who used it for buildings and clothing. Rose and his men did not realize that the trees were Mohave property so they were cut down and used to build the rafts. When the Mohave discovered that their valuable cottonwoods had been disturbed, they responded by attacking the settlers with their Walapai allies. The Rose Party included dozens of women and children with only twenty-five men at arms fighting against hundreds of Mohave warriors. The Walapai with a small bunch of Mohaves focused on attacking four women and children held up in a cabin built in the mountains outside of the camp while the main Mohave force attacked the camp itself. In the end seventeen warriors were killed and left on the battlefield while the Americans lost one killed, Alpha Brown, and eleven seriously injured. The settlers won the day by repulsing the Mohave attack but they lost most of their livestock and instead of crossing the border into California, they turned around and went back to New Mexico.

Irataba and his band of Mohaves, who had been key in establishing peace at the end of the Yuma War, were against conflict with the United States and later Irataba became a high-ranking leader among his people after helping end the Mohave War. The war with the Maricopa was also ongoing and this was a major reason why Irataba was for cooperating with the Americans. Irataba's opinion was not accepted in 1858 though, other important chiefs were for war with the United States, including Cairook and Sickahot. The other chiefs were highly popular among their warriors so Irataba was powerless to stop them.

== First Mohave Expedition ==
News of the battle at Beale's Crossing reached the media quickly followed by the United States War Department and General Newman S. Clarke in Los Angeles. Clarke sent Lieutenant Colonel William Hoffman of the 6th Cavalry on an expedition to Beale's Crossing to build a post for protecting settlers crossing the Colorado. Hoffman set out from a ranch in Cajon Canyon on December 28, 1858, hoping to make it across the Mohave Desert along the Mohave Road before the heat of summer could set in.

In January 1859, Hoffman was encamped with his fifty men near Beaver Lake. Chief Cairook was in the area with about 300 men and the two sides encountered one another in an Indian war skirmish known as the Battle of Beaver Lake. The American camp was surrounded but accurate musket fire proved deadly for the Mohaves and ten to twelve were seen to fall according to Hoffman's account. The Americans went back to base after this fight without establishing a post on the Colorado. On March 1, Lieutenant Samuel A. Bishop was sent from Los Angeles to deliver fresh supplies to Lieutenant Edward Beale who was working on his road in northern Arizona. With thirty-eight men on camels and several wagons and mules, the column was met at Cave Canyon in the Mohave Desert by employees of the Central Overland Mail company and soon after by 1,500 warriors. The Mohaves opened fire on the small troop of Americans but they reportedly missed their targets intentionally but later moved in closer for a deliberate attack. In the ensuing skirmish, two natives were wounded by musketry, one of whom died later on. Lieutenant Bishop decided it would be best to send the wagons back to the coast while he successfully proceeded to Beale's camp.

== Second Mohave Expedition ==
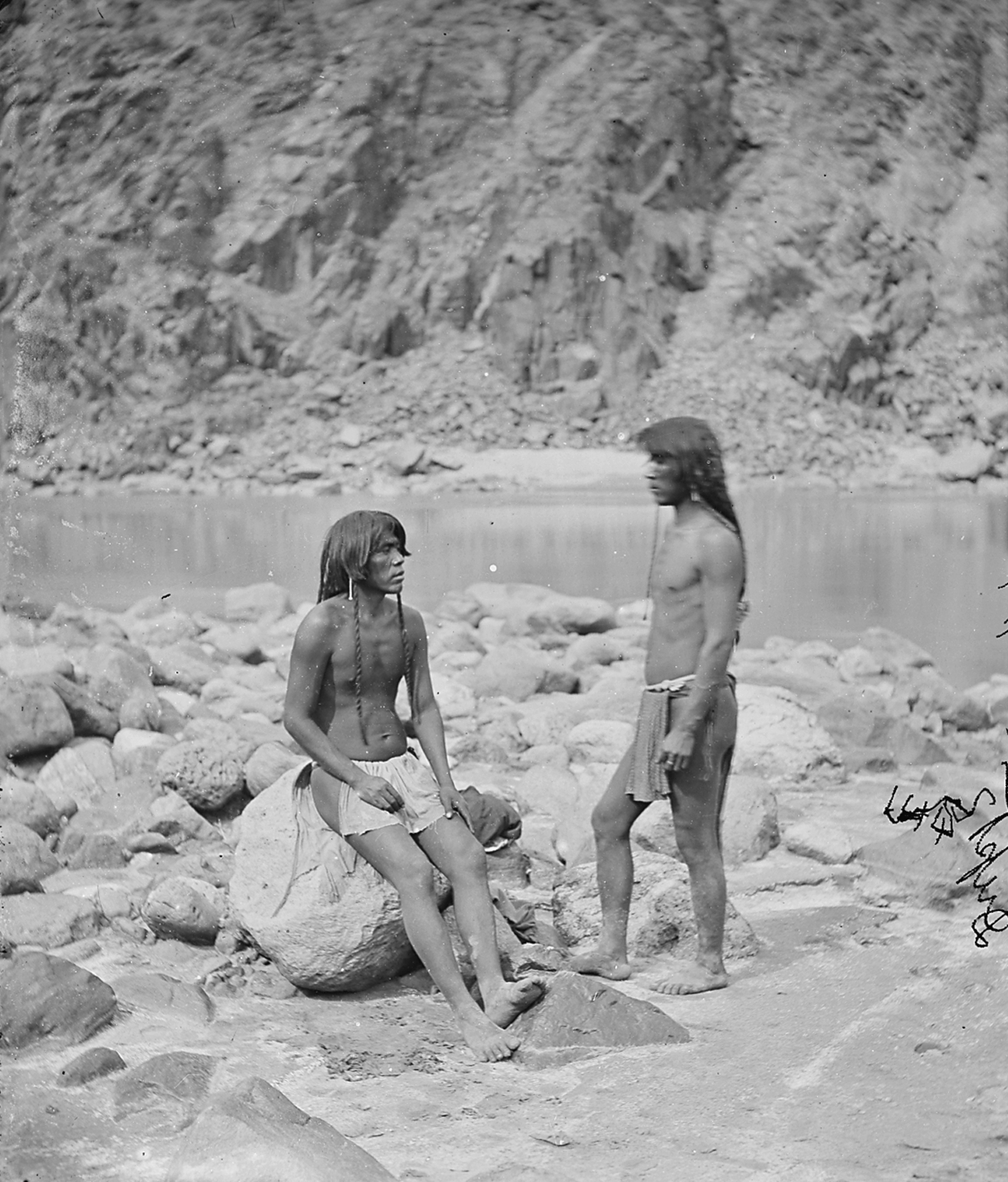
Two Mohave men next to the Colorado River in 1871

Lieutenant Colonel Hoffman used the battle at Beaver Lake as justification to ask the War Department for more troops. So in April 1859, another expedition was sent to the Colorado which included over 600 infantry, cavalry and artillery. After establishing Camp Gaston as an advance base, Hoffman's second expedition reached Beale's Crossing and Camp Colorado was officially established on April 19 and nine days later it was renamed Fort Mohave by Captain Lewis Addison Armistead. On April 23, Lieutenant Colonel Hoffman arrived at the Mohave villages and discussed peace with the inhabitants. Hoffman told the chiefs that if they would agree to not attack immigrants traveling through their land and not oppose the government's building of roads and forts in Mohave territory, then they would not be destroyed. Reluctantly the Mohave agreed and Chief Cairook surrendered himself and was taken down the Colorado to Fort Yuma with eight others. Hoffman then went to San Bernardino and left Captain Armistead of the 6th Infantry in charge of Fort Mohave with fifty men and a few artillery pieces. Meanwhile, troops and two river steamers were waiting at Fort Yuma to reinforce Fort Mohave if necessary.

== Escape from Fort Yuma ==
After several weeks of a long hot summer in a cell, Chief Cairook and the eight others plotted their escape. Every day the prisoners were allowed to leave the cell for fresh air; and it was during one of these recesses in late June that the simple plan unfolded. Cairook seized one of his sentries while the eight others ran for the brush. The other sentries noticed and opened fire on the fleeing Mohaves; one was killed and Cairook was bayoneted and shot. Three of the Mohaves eventually made it back to their villages and told the high chief, Espaniole, who decided to end the peace and attack a mail station two miles south of Fort Mohave. There the station was destroyed along with a field of melons planted by the Americans. When Captain Armistead learned of this he launched a series of small operations against the Mohaves with his fifty men and engaged in several small skirmishes.

== Battle of the Colorado River ==
It was not until August 4, 1859 that the only pitched battle of the war was fought. Captain Armstead and First Lieutenant Elisha Marshall led fifty men in an attack on over 200 Mohaves twelve miles south of the fort along the Colorado River. The natives were routed, leaving twenty-three warriors on the field, while only three Americans were wounded. Next the Mohave under the direction of Chief Espaniole sued for peace and the war was over. There was still a group among the Mohaves that wanted to continue fighting the United States, though no renewed conflict came about. Irataba, with support of the United States Army, became a prominent leader and was considered vital for maintaining the peace. When word of peace reached the Maricopa, they sent Chief Ahwantsevarih to Mohave territory to end their war, which was little more than minor raiding, with the exception of one engagement at Pima Butte in 1857. Irataba met with Ahwantsevarih, and the two chiefs agreed to have peace and establish trade relations.

== Bibliography ==
- Baley, Charles (2002). Disaster At The Colorado: Beale's Wagon Road and the First Emigrant Party. Utah State University Press. ISBN 978-0874214376.
- Kroeber, A.L.; Kroeber, C.B. (1994) [1973]. A Mohave War Reminiscence, 1854–1880. Dover Publications. ISBN 978-0486281636.
