= Homoseh quahote =

Hereditary leader of the Mohave (c. 1800 – c. 1872)

- Homoseh quahote (Sicihoot), War Chief of the Mojaves, at Fort Mojave, Arizona, 1868

Mohave leader
- Preceded by: Unknown
- Succeeded by: Empote quatacheech

Personal details
- Born: Unknown Arizona
- Died: Unknown Fort Mohave

Homoseh quahote (meaning "orator of the stars" in Mohave) also called Seck-a-hoot, Sicihoot or Sickahoot in some English language sources; c. 1800 – c. 1872) was a hereditary leader of the Mohave.

== Life ==
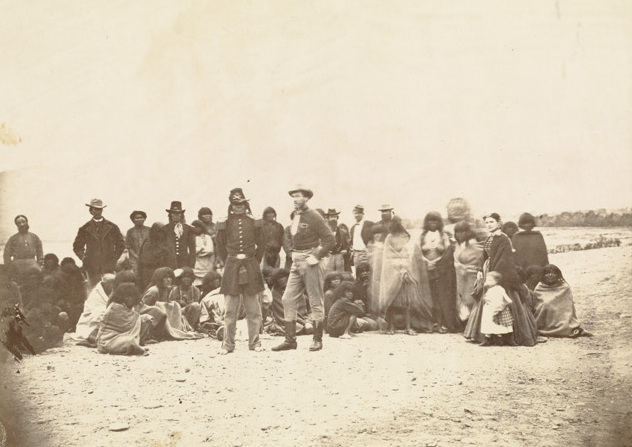
Homoseh quahote stands in front of a group of Indians at Fort Mojave, Arizona, 1868.

Homoseh quahote was a member of the Malika clan of Mohave and designated as Aha macave pipataho, which tribal elder Gwegwi nuor of the Oach clan translated as the leader "looked up to by the people because of the kind of person he was". In 1966, Gwegwi nuor provided the only known description of him:

Chief Humsoquahoat is over 6 ft tall and not heavy built but the scars on his breast shows that he has fought many people for justice or carry out the set up [of] our government. His hair is long, he's painted in red, white and black and armed and [a] few feathers on his head.

In 1861, Homoseh quahote abdicated the position as leader of the Mohave to Irataba, who served in that capacity until at least 1866 or 1867, though opinions differ. By 1870, Seck-a-hoot had regained his position. The exact year of his death is unknown, but the last official correspondence from the Fort Mohave Indian Reservation that mention him are dated to 1872. He was succeeded as leader of the Mohave by his son, Empote quotacheech.

In 1867, Homoseh quahote was reported to have been part of a group that killed an entire party of 21 Hualapais after they had murdered a group of six American miners in the Fort Mohave area.

== Bibliography ==
- Sherer, Lorraine M. (March 1966). "Great Chieftains of the Mojave Indians". Southern California Quarterly. 48 (1): 1–35. doi:10.2307/41169985. JSTOR 41169985.
