= 57th Virginia Infantry Regiment =

- Active: September 1861 – April 9, 1865
- Disbanded: April 9, 1865
- Country: Confederate States of America
- Allegiance: Virginia
- Branch: Confederate States Army
- Type: Infantry
- Size: Regiment
- Engagements: American Civil War: Seven Days' Battles; Second Battle of Bull Run; Battle of Antietam; Battle of Fredericksburg; Battle of Chancellorsville; Battle of Gettysburg; Overland Campaign; Siege of Petersburg; Battle of Sailor's Creek; Appomattox Campaign

Commanders
- Notable commanders: Colonel Lewis A. Armistead; Colonel David Dyer; Colonel John B. Magruder

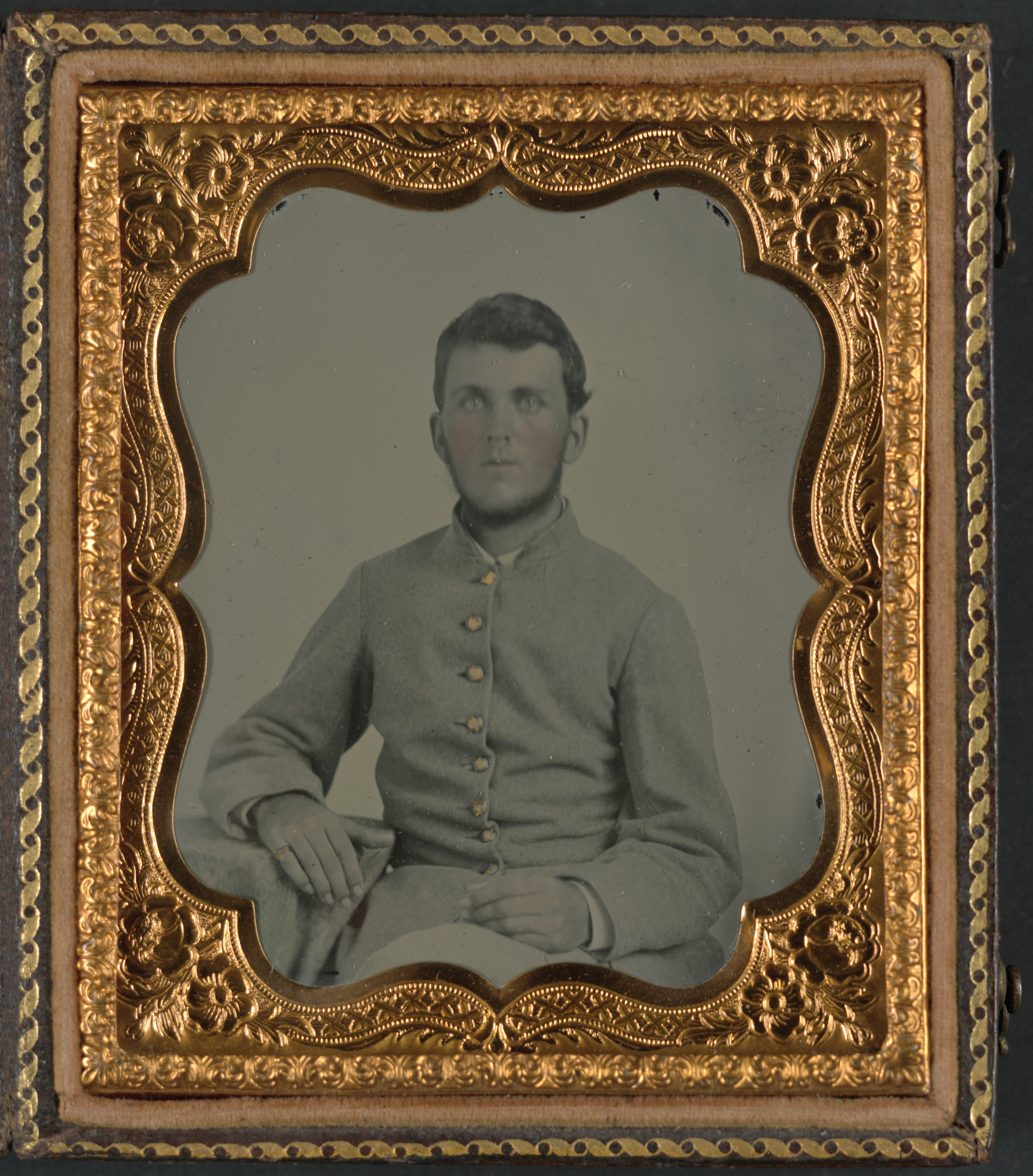
Sergeant William T. Belew of Company H, 57th Virginia Infantry

The 57th Virginia Infantry Regiment was an infantry regiment raised in Virginia for service in the Confederate States Army during the American Civil War. It fought mostly with the Army of Northern Virginia.

The 57th Virginia was organized in September 1861, by adding five independent companies to the five companies of E.F. Keen's Battalion. The 57th was composed mainly of men from Albemarle, Botetourt, Buckingham, Franklin, Henry, Pittsylvania, and Powhatan counties. The unit was assigned to General Armistead's, Barton's, and Steuart's Brigade, Army of Northern Virginia.

It participated in many conflicts from the Seven Days' Battles to Gettysburg, served in North Carolina, then saw action at Drewry's Bluff and Cold Harbor. The 57th continued the fight in the Petersburg trenches north of the James River and around Appomattox.

It reported 113 casualties at Malvern Hill and lost more than sixty percent of the 476 engaged at Gettysburg. There were 7 killed, 31 wounded, and 3 missing at Drewry's Bluff, and many were disabled at Sayler's Creek. On April 9, 1865, the unit surrendered 7 officers and 74 men.

Its commanders were Colonels Lewis A. Armistead, George W. Carr, David Dyer, Clement R. Fontaine, Elisha F. Keen, and John Bowie Magruder; Lieutenant Colonels Waddy T. James, William H. Ramsey, and Benjamin H. Wade; and Majors Garland B. Hanes, David P. Heckman, and Andrew J. Smith.

== See also ==
- List of Virginia Civil War units
