= Eldorado Mountains =

Mountain range in Nevada, US

- El Dorado Mountains
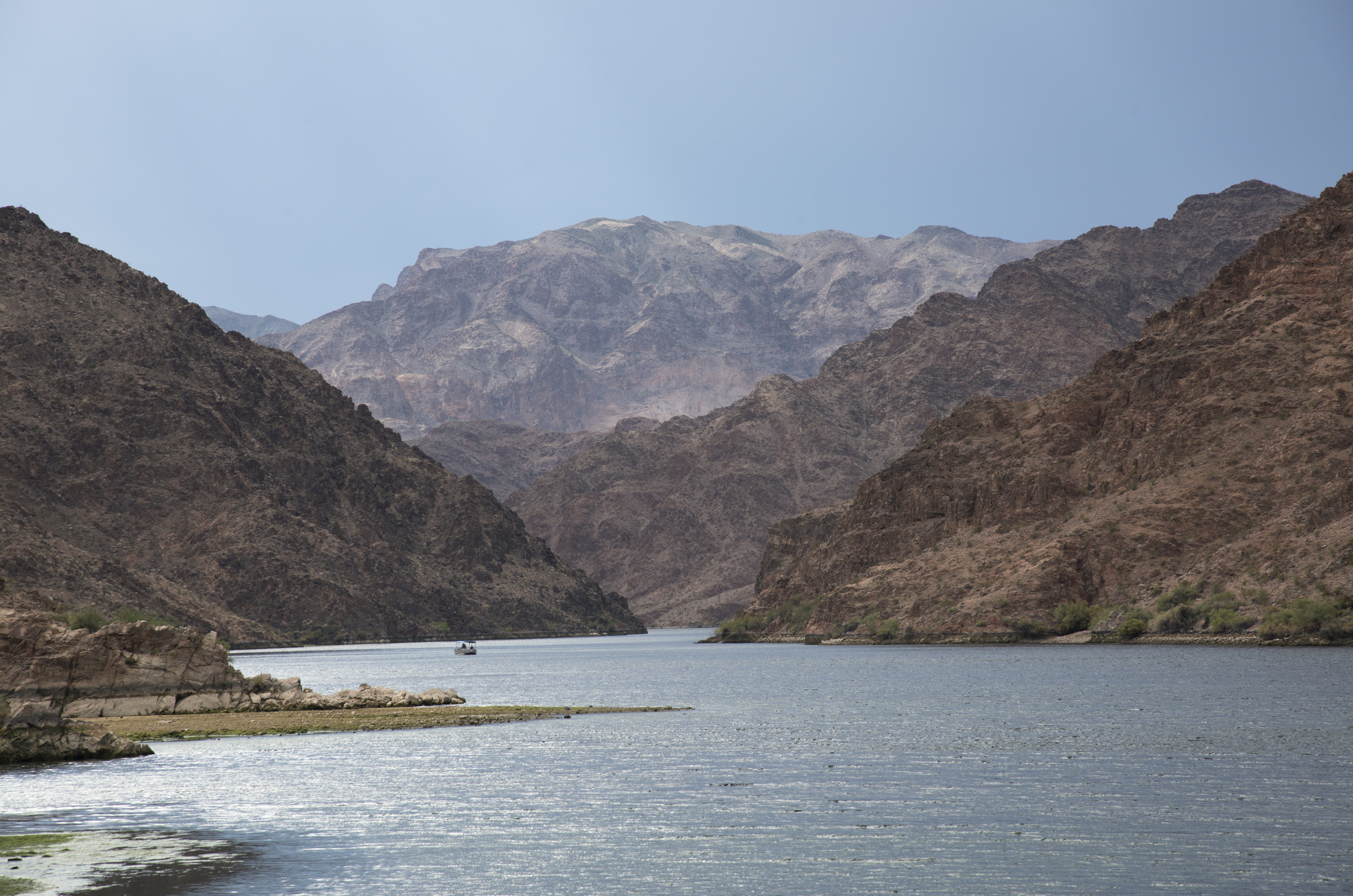
- (view of east flank, north); From the Colorado River, downstream from Willow Beach, Lake Mohave. Nevada is at right, and the prominence, forward. Arizona's (Black Mountains (Arizona) is on left bank. The view is downstream & slightly west-southwestwards.

Highest point
- Peak: Ireteba Peak, Eldorado Mountains
- Elevation: 5,060 ft (1,540 m)

Geography
- Eldorado Mountains in Nevada
- Country: United States
- State: Nevada
- District: Clark County
- Range coordinates: 35°48′26.944″N 114°46′57.927″W
- Topo map: USGS Boulder City SE

The Eldorado Mountains, also called the El Dorado Mountains, are a north-south trending mountain range in southeast Nevada bordering west of the south-flowing Colorado River; the endorheic Eldorado Valley borders the range to the west, and the range is also on the western border of the Colorado River's Black Canyon of the Colorado, and El Dorado Canyon on the river. The range is 50 miles (80 km) southeast of Las Vegas, Nevada; and the Eldorado Mountains connect with the Highland and Newberry mountains.

The name El Dorado is taken from the name of a legendary gold mine, and the ghost town-mining location of Nelson in Nelson Canyon, transects the central portion of the range. The Nelson Overlook is a viewing point over the Colorado River's El Dorado Canyon.

== Wilderness ==
The mountain range contains the Eldorado Wilderness of 320,060 acres (129,520 ha). Established in 2004, the area is jointly managed by the NPS and the BLM. The NPS manages the eastern section within the Lake Mead National Recreation Area and the BLM manages the western section.

This desert wilderness is a rugged maze of hills, peaks, and winding canyons. The Eldorado Range is volcanic rock with basalt flows on a base of metamorphic rock. A bajada extends northwest of the mountains. Creosote bush, scrub oak, clump grass, and various cacti cover the mountains and foothills. This supports a significant population of bighorn sheep in the higher elevations. Abandoned mine sites are scattered among the region. Water is scarce, besides the Colorado River, and summer temperatures can reach 120 °F (48 °C).

To the south, Ireteba Peaks Wilderness of 32,745 acres (13,251 ha) is composed of the Ireteba Ridge at 5,013 feet (1,528 m), that overlooks to the east, the northern portions of Lake Mohave and the El Dorado Canyon. The high point of the Eldorado Mountains is Ireteba Peak at 5,060 feet (1,542 m), which is named for the Mohave Indian guide and tribal leader Irataba.

Some communities associated with the range, are in the south, Searchlight on US 95 and Cottonwood Cove, on the river. Nelson is in the center of the range, and the nearest community north is Boulder City.
