= Ireteba Peaks Wilderness =

Wilderness area in Nevada

- IUCN category Ib (wilderness area)
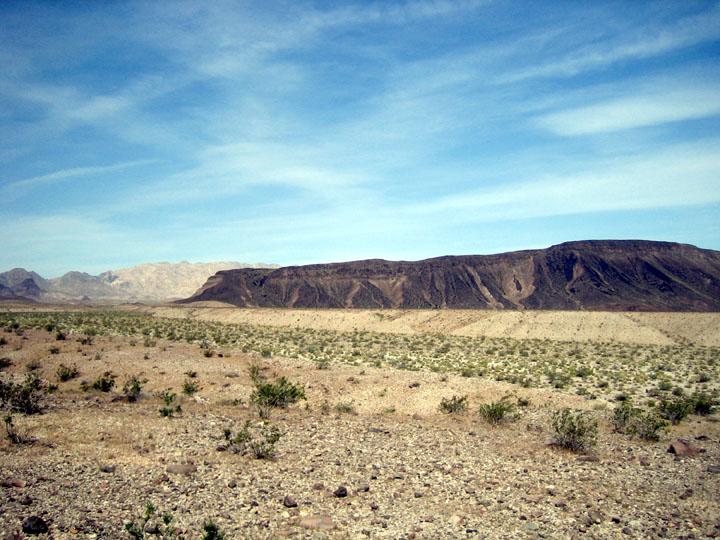
- Landscape of Iretaba Peaks Wilderness

- Location within the United States
- Location: Clark County, Nevada, USA
- Nearest city: Las Vegas, NV
- Coordinates: 35°35′39.96″N 114°49′43.92″W
- Area: 32,745 acres (132.51 km^{2})
- Established: 2002
- Governing body: National Park Service, Bureau of Land Management

Ireteba Peaks Wilderness is a 32,745 acre (13,251 ha) wilderness area spanning the area of the southern part of Eldorado Mountains to the northern parts of Lake Mohave. It is located 45 miles (72 km) south of Las Vegas and was designated as a wilderness area in 2002. Iretaba Peaks Wilderness is managed by the National Park Service and the Bureau of Land Management. The western (BLM) portion of the wilderness is part of Avi Kwa Ame National Monument, designated in 2023.

== Geography ==
The peaks were named after one of the leaders of the Mohave tribe, Irataba. Native vegetation in the area includes creosote, yucca, desert willow, and several cacti species. Desert tortoises, Townsend’s big-eared bats, and bighorn sheep can also be found in Iretaba Peaks Wilderness.

== See also ==
- List of wilderness area in Nevada
