= Elisha Marshall =

Brigadier general of the Union Army

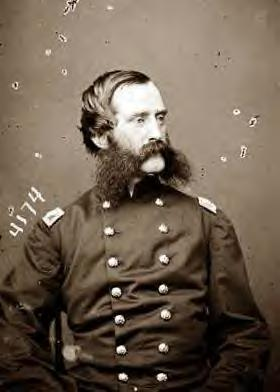
- Born: Elisha Gaylord Marshall; January 26, 1829; Seneca Falls, New York, US
- Died: January 26, 1883 (aged 54); Canandaigua, New York, US
- Burial place: Mount Hope Cemetery
- Military career
- Allegiance: USA
- Branch: Union Army
- Rank: Brigadier general
- Commands: 13th New York Volunteer Infantry
- Conflicts: American Civil War: Battle of Fredericksburg; Battle of the Crater

Elisha Gaylord Marshall (January 26, 1829 -– August 3, 1883) was a brevet brigadier general of the Union Army in the American Civil War.

== Life and career ==
Born in Seneca Falls, New York on January 26, 1829, Marshall graduated from West Point in 1850. He served in the Utah War as a first lieutenant. He also fought in the Battle of the Colorado River in 1859 during the Mohave War in Arizona.

He was promoted to captain in May 1861, and became a colonel of volunteers in April 1862. He was seriously wounded while leading the 13th New York Volunteer Infantry in the Battle of Fredericksburg, and did not return to active duty until early 1864. He was captured in the Battle of the Crater, and was held as a prisoner of war until April 1865.

Marshall received brevet promotions to brigadier general of volunteers in December 1862, to recognize his service at Fredericksburg, and of the Regular Army in March 1865 to recognize his service throughout the war.

Following the war, he was reduced in rank to major, and served in the Army until retiring with the permanent rank of colonel in September 1867.

His first wife was Hannah Viola Ericsson (1844–1873). They had two children, Nora (1861–1865) and Aaron (1872–1873). In 1875, Marshall married Janet Rutherford. They later separated, and Mrs. Marshall lived at Marshall Hill, a fourteen-room mansion the Marshalls built on a red shale hill near the Lehigh River and Blue Mountain in Palmerton, Pennsylvania. Janet Rutherford Marshall died in 1911, and her estate was appraised at more than one million dollars, equivalent to about $24 million in 2013.

He died Canandaigua, New York on January 26, 1883., and was buried with his first wife in Rochester's Mount Hope Cemetery.

In June 2000 Marshall's grave was broken into, his skull was stolen, and his remains were scattered around his grave. The perpetrators were not caught, and Marshall's remains, minus the skull, were reinterred.
