= Lewis Armistead =

Confederate general (1817–1863)

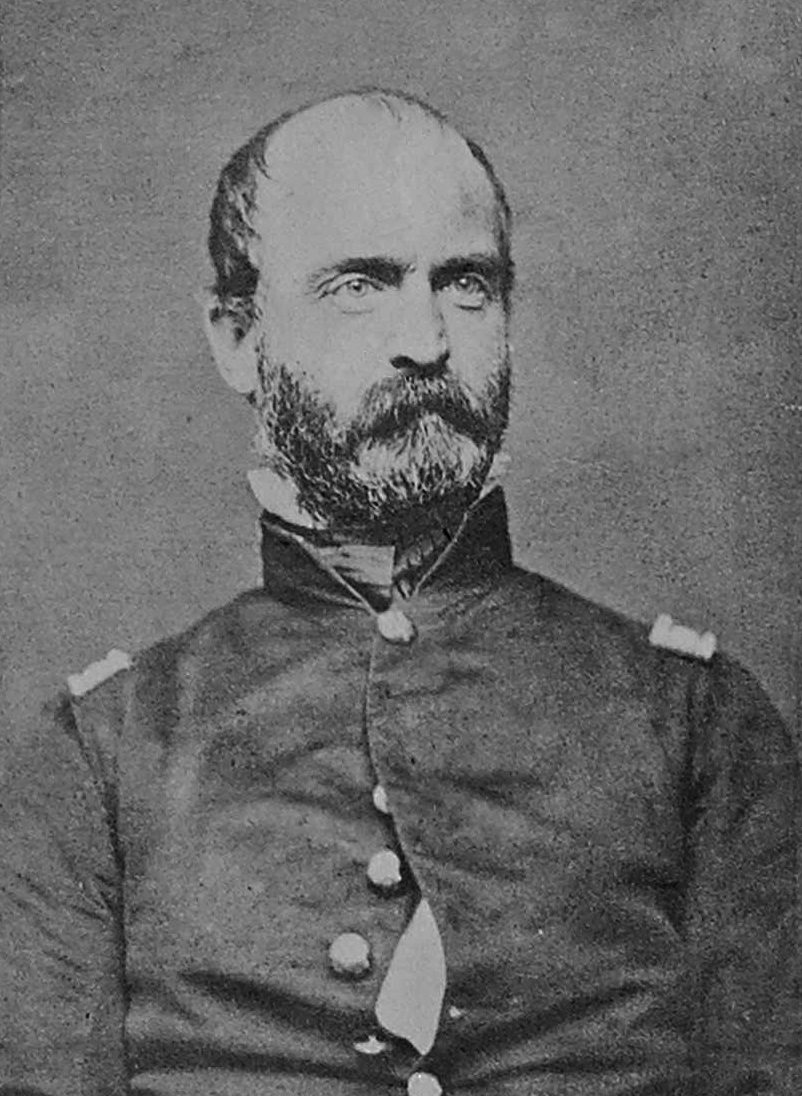
- Armistead, c. 1861–1863
- Born: February 18, 1817; New Bern, North Carolina, U.S.
- Died: July 5, 1863 (aged 46); Gettysburg, Pennsylvania, U.S.
- Burial place: Old Saint Paul's Cemetery; Baltimore, Maryland
- Relatives: Walker Keith Armistead (father); George Armistead (uncle); Edward Stanly (uncle); John Stanly (grandfather)
- Military career
- Allegiance: United States; Confederate States
- Branch: United States Army; Confederate States Army
- Service years: 1839–61 (USA); 1861–63 (CSA)
- Rank: Brevet Major (USA); Brigadier General (CSA)
- Nickname: "Lo"
- Units: 6th U.S. Infantry
- Commands: 57th Virginia Infantry; Armistead's Bde, Pickett's Div, I Corps
- Conflicts: Mexican–American War; Battle of Chapultepec; Mohave War; Battle of the Colorado River (1859); American Civil War; Battle of Seven Pines; Seven Days Battles; Battle of Malvern Hill; Second Battle of Manassas; Battle of Antietam; Battle of Fredericksburg; Battle of Gettysburg; Pickett's Charge (DOW)

Lewis Addison Armistead (February 18, 1817 – July 5, 1863) was a career United States Army officer who became a brigadier general in the Confederate States Army during the American Civil War. On July 3, 1863, as part of Pickett's Charge during the Battle of Gettysburg, Armistead led his brigade to the farthest point reached by Confederate forces during the charge, a point now referred to as the high-water mark of the Confederacy. However, he and his men were overwhelmed, and he was wounded and captured by Union troops. He died in a field hospital two days later.

== Early life ==
Armistead, known to friends as "Lo" (for Lothario), was born in the home of his great-grandfather, John Wright Stanly, in New Bern, North Carolina, to Walker Keith Armistead and Elizabeth Stanly. He came from an esteemed military family. Armistead was of entirely English descent, and all of his ancestry had been in Virginia since the early 1600s. The first of his ancestors to emigrate to North America was William Armistead from Yorkshire, England. Armistead's father was one of five brothers who fought in the War of 1812; another was Major George Armistead, the commander of Fort McHenry during the battle that inspired Francis Scott Key to write "The Star-Spangled Banner", which would later become the national anthem of the United States. On his mother's side, his grandfather John Stanly was a U.S. Congressman, and his uncle Edward Stanly served as military governor of eastern North Carolina during the Civil War.

Armistead attended the United States Military Academy, joining in 1833 but resigning the same year. He rejoined in 1834 but was found deficient and had to repeat his class once more. In 1836 he resigned again following an incident in which he broke a plate over the head of fellow cadet (and future Confederate general) Jubal Early. He was also having academic difficulties, however, particularly in French (a subject of difficulty for many West Point cadets of that era), and some historians cite academic failure as his true reason for leaving the academy.

His influential father managed to obtain for his son a second lieutenant's commission in the 6th U.S. Infantry on July 10, 1839, at roughly the time his classmates graduated. He was promoted to first lieutenant on March 30, 1844. Armistead's first marriage was to Cecelia Lee Love, a distant cousin of Robert E. Lee, in 1844. They had two children: Walker Keith Armistead and Flora Lee Armistead.

Armistead then served in Fort Towson, Oklahoma and Fort Washita near the Oklahoma border. Serving in the Mexican War, he was appointed brevet captain for Contreras and Churubusco, wounded at Chapultepec, and was appointed a brevet major for Molino del Rey and Chapultepec.

Armistead continued in the Army after the Mexican War, assigned in 1849 to recruiting duty in Kentucky, where he was diagnosed with a severe case of erysipelas, but he later recovered. In April 1850, the Armisteads lost their little girl, Flora Love, at Jefferson Barracks. Armistead was posted to Fort Dodge, but in the winter he had to take his wife Cecelia to Mobile, Alabama, where she died December 12, 1850, from an unknown cause. He returned to Fort Dodge. In 1852 the Armistead family home in Virginia burned, destroying nearly everything. Armistead took leave in October 1852 to go home and help his family. While on leave Armistead married his second wife, the widow Cornelia Taliaferro Jamison, in Alexandria, Virginia, on March 17, 1853. They both went west when Armistead returned to duty shortly thereafter.

The new Armistead family traveled from post to post in Nebraska, Missouri, and Kansas. The couple had one child, Lewis B. Armistead, who died on December 6, 1854, and was also buried at Jefferson Barracks next to Flora Lee Armistead. He was promoted to captain on March 3, 1855. His second wife, Cornelia Taliaferro Jamison, died on August 3, 1855, at Fort Riley, Kansas, during a cholera epidemic.

Between 1855 and 1858 Armistead served at posts on the Smoky Hill River in Kansas Territory, Bent's Fort, Pole Creek, Laramie River, and Republican Fork of the Kansas River in Nebraska Territory. In 1858, his 6th Infantry Regiment was sent as part of the reinforcements sent to Utah in the aftermath of the Utah War. Not being required there, they were sent to California with the intention of sending them on to Washington Territory. However, a Mohave attack on civilians on the Beale Wagon Road diverted his regiment to the southern deserts along the Colorado River to participate in the Mojave Expedition of 1858–59.

Lt. Col. William Hoffman, at the head of a column of six companies of infantry, two of dragoons, and some artillery, struggled up the Colorado River from Fort Yuma. On April 23, 1859, Colonel Hoffman dictated a peace to the overawed Mohave chiefs, threatening annihilation to the tribe if they did not cease hostilities, make no opposition to the establishment of posts and roads through their country, and allow travel free from their harassment. Hoffman also took some of their leading men or family members hostage. Afterward he left for San Bernardino, taking most of his force with him; others went down river by steamboat or overland to Fort Tejon.

Captain Armistead was left with two infantry companies and the column's artillery to garrison Hoffman's encampment at Beale's Crossing on the east bank of the Colorado River, Camp Colorado. Armistead renamed the post Fort Mojave. In late June 1859 the Mohave hostages escaped from Fort Yuma. Trouble broke out with the Mohave a few weeks later when they stole stock from a mail station that had been established two miles south of Fort Mojave, and attacked it. Mohaves tore up melons planted by the soldiers near the fort, and the soldiers shot a Mohave who was working in a garden. Eventually after a few weeks of aggressive patrolling and skirmishes, Armistead attacked the Mohave who returned fire in a battle between about 50 soldiers and 200 Mohave, resulting in three soldiers wounded. Twenty-three Mohave bodies were found but more were killed and wounded and removed by the Mohave. Following this defeat, the Mohave made a peace, which they kept from then on.

== Civil War ==
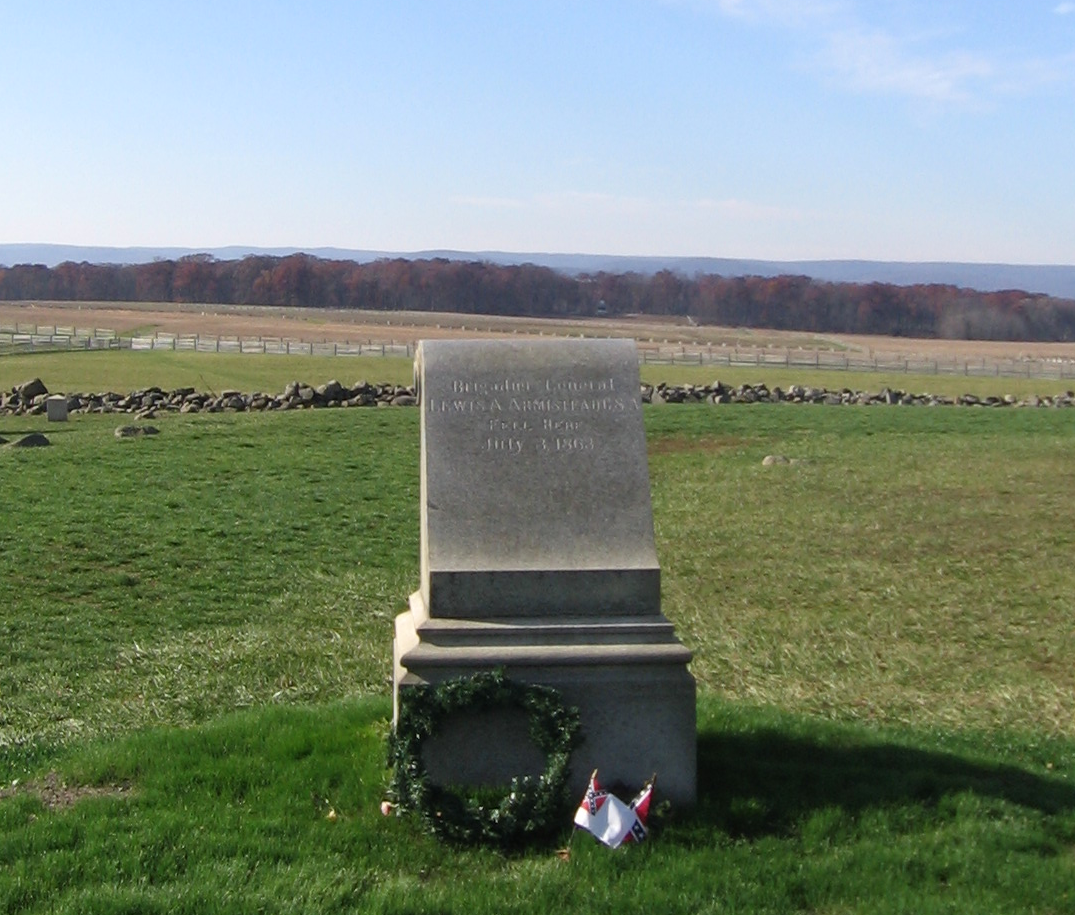
This monument on the Gettysburg Battlefield marks the approximate place where Armistead was mortally wounded. The wall behind the monument marks the Union lines.

When the Civil War began, Captain Armistead was in command of the small garrison at the New San Diego Depot in San Diego, which was occupied in 1860. He was a close friend of Winfield Scott Hancock, serving with him as a quartermaster in Los Angeles, before the Civil War. Accounts say that in a farewell party before leaving to join the Confederate army, Armistead told Hancock, "Goodbye; you can never know what this has cost me."

When the war started, Armistead departed from California to Texas with the Los Angeles Mounted Rifles, then traveled east and received a commission as a major, but was quickly promoted to colonel of the 57th Virginia Infantry regiment. He served in the western part of Virginia, but soon returned to the east and the Army of Northern Virginia. He fought as a brigade commander at Seven Pines, and then under General Robert E. Lee in the Seven Days Battles (where he was chosen to spearhead the bloody assault on Malvern Hill), and Second Bull Run. At Antietam, he served as Lee's provost marshal, a frustrating job due to the high levels of desertion that plagued the army in that campaign. Then he was a brigade commander in Maj. Gen. George Pickett's division at Fredericksburg. Because he was with Lt. Gen. James Longstreet's First Corps near Suffolk, Virginia in the spring of 1863, he missed the Battle of Chancellorsville.

In the Battle of Gettysburg, Armistead's brigade arrived the evening of July 2, 1863. Armistead was mortally wounded the next day while leading his brigade towards the center of the Union line in Pickett's Charge. Armistead led his brigade from the front, waving his hat from the tip of his saber, and reached the stone wall at The Angle, which served as the charge's objective. The brigade got farther in the charge than any other, an event sometimes known as the high-water mark of the Confederacy, but it was quickly overwhelmed by a Union counterattack. Armistead was shot three times just after crossing the wall. Union Captain Henry H. Bingham received Armistead's personal effects and carried the news to Union Major General Winfield Hancock, Armistead's friend from before the war.

Armistead's wounds were not believed to be mortal; he had been shot in the fleshy part of the arm and below the knee, and according to the surgeon who tended him, none of the wounds caused bone, artery, or nerve damage. He was then taken to a Union field hospital at the George Spangler Farm where he died two days later. Dr. Daniel Brinton, the chief surgeon at the Union hospital there, had expected Armistead to survive because he characterized the two bullet wounds as not of a "serious character." He wrote that the death "was not from his wounds directly, but from secondary bacterium, fever and prostration."

Lewis Armistead is buried next to his uncle, Lieutenant Colonel George Armistead, commander of the garrison of Fort McHenry during the Battle of Baltimore, at the Old Saint Paul's Cemetery in Baltimore, Maryland.

== Legacy ==
Armistead's sword was returned to the South at a reunion of Civil War veterans held at Gettysburg in 1906.

His death is memorialized in the Friend to Friend Masonic Memorial located on the Gettysburg Battlefield, dedicated in 1994.

== In popular media ==
In Gettysburg, the film version of Michael Shaara's novel The Killer Angels, Armistead was portrayed by actor Richard Jordan, who died shortly afterwards. In the film, the meeting between Armistead and Bingham at the High Water Mark was altered with Lt. Thomas Chamberlain (portrayed by C. Thomas Howell), brother of Col. Joshua Lawrence Chamberlain, taking Bingham's place. In the original novel and in the movie, Armistead was shot in the chest; in the novel, Armistead dies on the spot, but that is corrected to two days afterward in the movie end titles.

Actor John Prosky depicted Armistead for a special appearance in Gods and Generals, accompanying Pickett at Fredericksburg.

Armistead is a character in the alternate history novel Gettysburg: A Novel of the Civil War (2003) by Newt Gingrich and William Forstchen.

== See also ==
- List of American Civil War generals (Confederate)
