= Mohave Canyon =

Land feature in San Bernardino County, California

Coordinates: 34.649°N 114.447°W

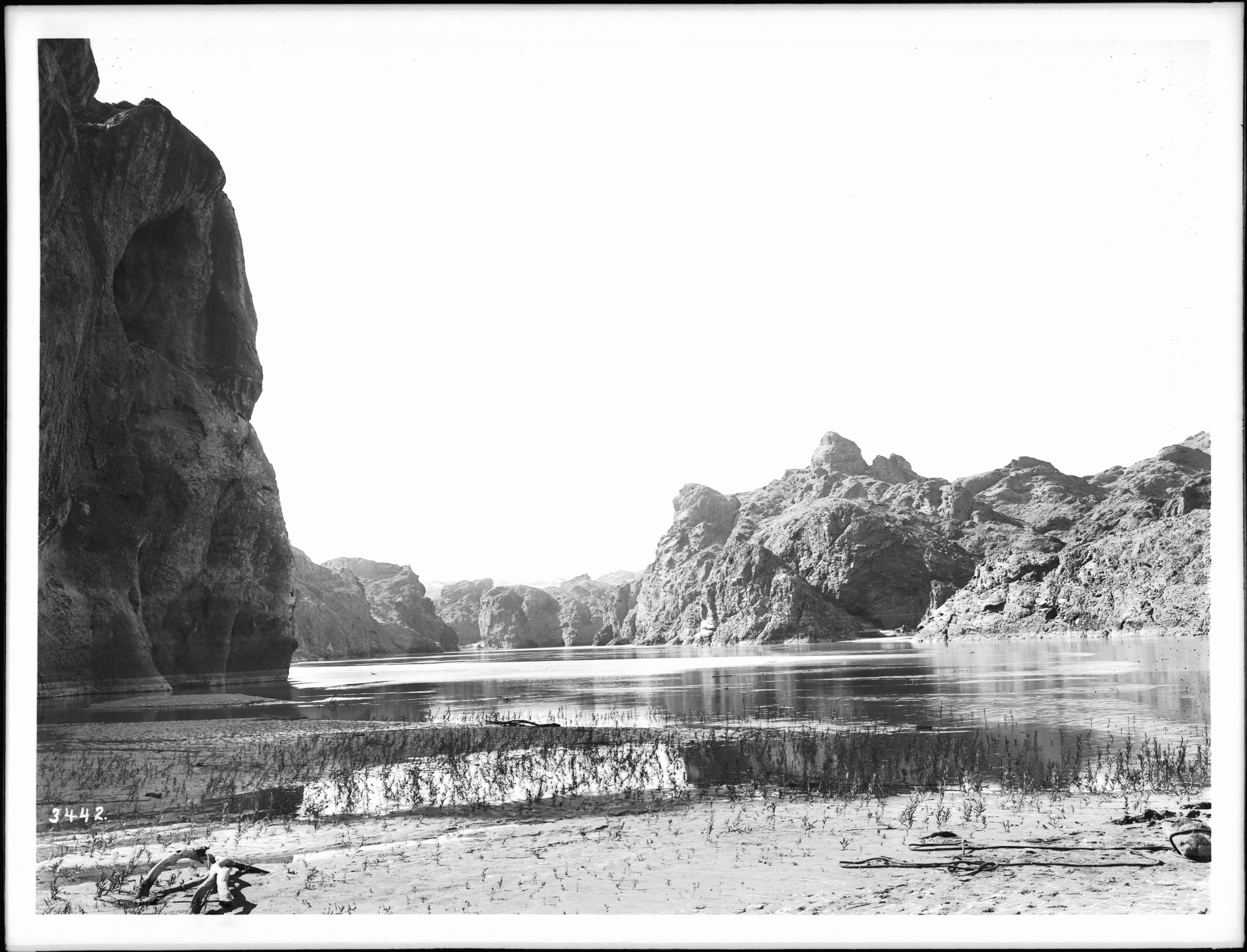
Photograph of the Colorado River entering Mojave Canyon, San Bernardino County, California, 1900–1950

The Mohave Canyon is located on the Colorado River, south of Needles, California. It is part of Topock Gorge, a mountainous canyon and gorge section of the Colorado River located between Interstate 40 and Lake Havasu.
