= Beale's Crossing =

River crossing, Colorado River

Coordinates: 35°02′40″N 114°37′21″W

Beale's Crossing was a river crossing on the Colorado River, near the head of the Mohave Valley, between New Mexico Territory (now Arizona) and California along the 35th Parallel route of Beale's Wagon Road. It was at what became the site of Fort Mohave in what is now Fort Mohave, Arizona, west of Beaver Lake, Nevada. It was named for Edward Fitzgerald Beale, who lead the expedition that built what came to be called Beale's Wagon Road from Albuquerque, New Mexico to Beale's Crossing in California, then by way of the Mohave Trail/Old Spanish Trail, and another old route west from the Mojave River to Fort Tejon, California.

== History ==
Beale's Crossing was originally where Beale's expedition swam his camels, horses, and mules west across the Colorado River and ferried their goods over on rafts. The first pioneer wagon trains that soon followed Beale's road to the crossing cut down trees along the river to make rafts. The Mohave people used these trees for clothing; and when the settlers cut them down without permission, it provoked a retaliation that triggered the Mohave War.

During the Mohave War, Camp Colorado, later renamed Fort Mohave, was established on the Colorado's east bank at the crossing. A ferry subsequently operated there, serving traffic on the Mojave Road, the government supply route from Los Angeles that terminated at Fort Mohave. From there Beale's Wagon Road passed east through Union Pass to Beale Spring, and the interior of northern New Mexico Territory to Fort Defiance, Zuni Pueblo and Albuquerque.

The ferry at Fort Mohave appears still in use on a September 1911 reprint of a U. S. Geological Survey, Reconnaissance Map, Arizona, Nevada, California, Camp Mohave Sheet, Edition of March 1892, reprinted.
