= Fort Mohave =

United States historic place

- Colorado River, Arizona
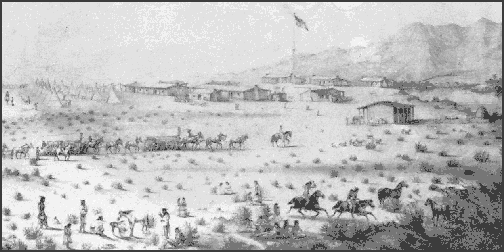
- A sketch of Fort Mohave in the late 1800s

Site information
- Type: Army fortification
- Controlled by: Arizona
- Condition: tourist attraction

Location
- Coordinates: 35°02′35″N 114°37′21″W

Site history
- Built: 1859
- Built by: United States
- In use: 1859–1890
- Battles/wars: Mohave War

Garrison information
- Occupants: United States Army

Airfield information
- Elevation: 540 ft (160 m) AMSL

Fort Mohave was originally named Camp Colorado when it was established on April 19, 1859 by Lieutenant Colonel William Hoffman during the Mohave War. It was located on the east bank of the Colorado River, at Beale's Crossing, near the head of the Mohave Valley in Mohave County, Arizona by the recommendation of Lieutenant Edward Fitzgerald Beale. After the end of the Indian Wars, the fort was transferred to the Bureau of Indian Affairs in 1890. In 1935 it was transferred to the Fort Mojave Indian Reservation; the fort is administered by the state of Arizona.

== History ==
The first known European to visit the area was Spanish explorer Melchor Díaz. He documented his travels in present-day northwestern Mohave County in 1540. He recounts meeting a large population of natives who referred to themselves as the Pipa Aha Macav, meaning "People by the River". From "Aha Macav" came the shortened name "Mojave" (also spelled "Mohave"). The tribe retains the traditional Spanish spelling "Mojave," but most English speakers use the modern English spelling "Mohave." Both are correct, and both are pronounced "Moh-hah-vee".

Named Camp Colorado, the fort was established by the US to provide protection for emigrants to California through Northern Arizona on the Beale's Wagon Road and across the Mojave Desert on the Mojave Road. It was also used as a base of military operations against the Mohave people.

The post was renamed Fort Mohave on April 28, 1859 by its first garrison commander Captain Lewis A. Armistead. With 50 soldiers he defeated 200 Mohave in a battle in the summer of 1859, and ended hostilities with them. Two years later after the start of the American Civil War, Brigadier General Edwin V. Sumner ordered the post abandoned and the buildings burned down on May 28, 1861 in order to withdraw the regular troops to garrison Los Angeles against an anticipated secessionist uprising. Later that year the regulars were sent east to serve with the Union in the Civil War.

On May 19, 1863, the post was rebuilt and re-garrisoned by companies B and I of the 4th California Infantry; they were assigned to protect the travelers along the Mohave and Prescott road. The Infantry successfully cultivated friendly relations with the Mojave Indians. These volunteer soldiers also took up prospecting and established mining claims in the area; they did not want to leave, and many returned after being mustered out after the end of the Civil War.

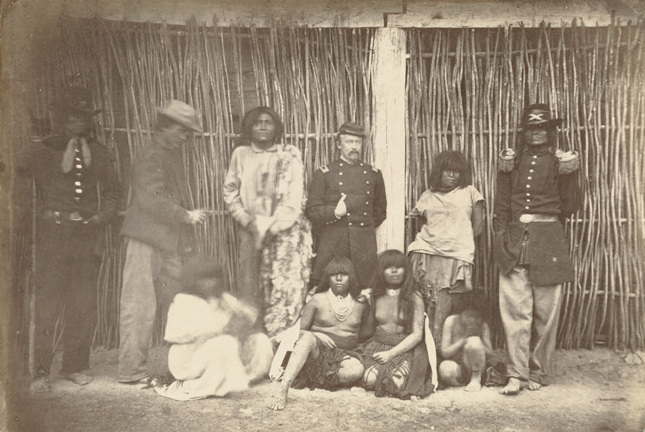
Mohave men and women and U.S. Army soldiers at Fort Mojave, ca. 1868

Fort Mohave was garrisoned again by regular United States Army troops until September 29, 1890, when the War Department transferred the land to the Office of Indian Affairs by order of President Benjamin Harrison. The buildings were used as the site of a boarding school for Native American children, where for decades students were required to use English and give up native traditions in an effort to assimilate them to the mainstream culture. After closing the school during the Great Depression, the Office of Indian Affairs transferred the property to the Fort Mojave Indian Reservation. The buildings were not maintained; the ruins of the fort are controlled by the state of Arizona as a tourist attraction.

== See also ==
- Bullhead City, Arizona
- Laughlin, Nevada
- Mohave City
- Needles, California
- Oatman, Arizona
