= Balduin Möllhausen =

German writer, traveler & artist

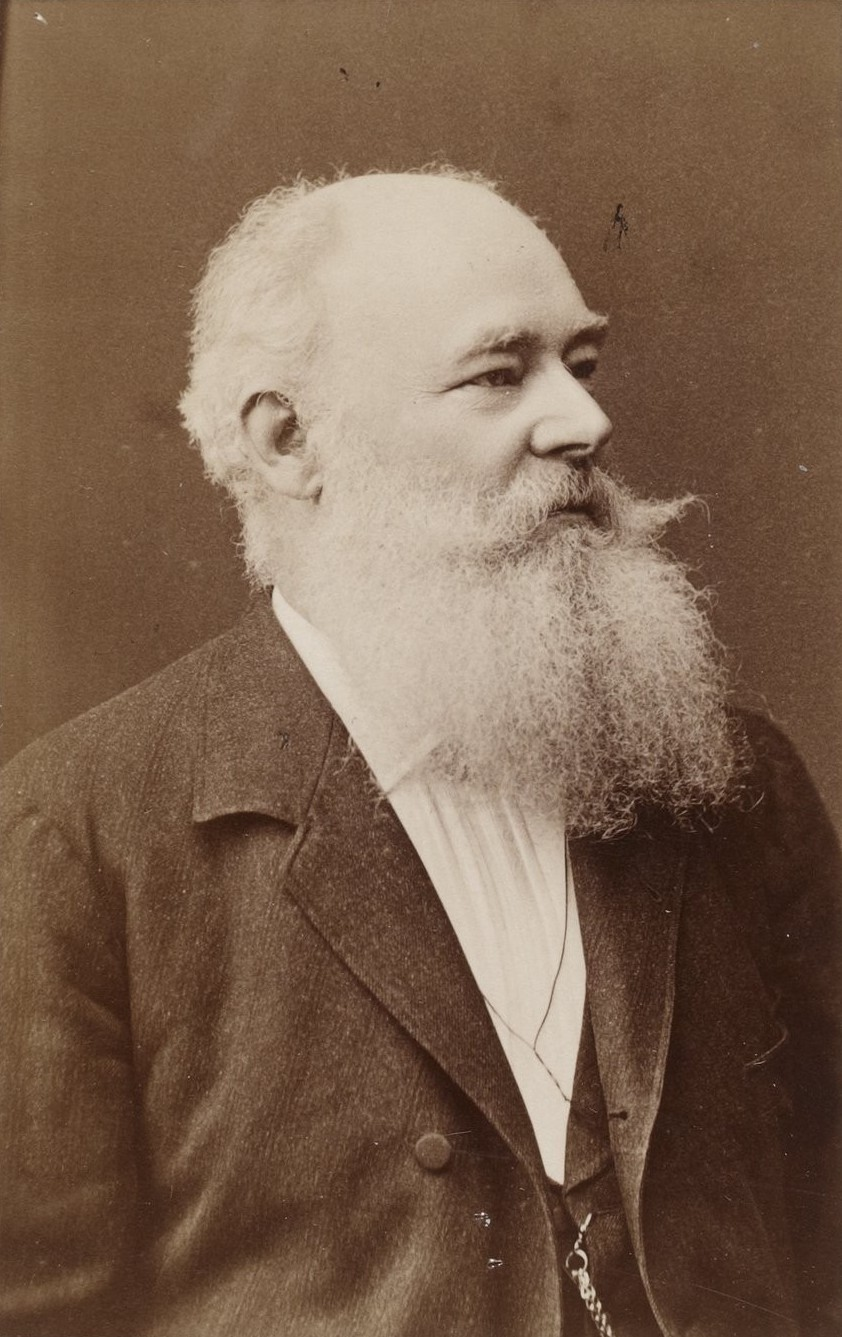
- Balduin Möllhausen, 1883

Heinrich Balduin Möllhausen (27 January 1825—28 May 1905) was a German writer, traveler and artist who visited the United States and participated in three separate expeditions exploring the American frontier. After his travel he became a popular and prolific author of adventure stories based on his experiences in America. It is estimated that he produced at least forty-five large works in 157 volumes (including almost forty novels) and eighty novelettes in twenty-one volumes. His popularity and subject matter earned him recognition as the German Fenimore Cooper.

== Biography ==
Möllhausen was born near Bonn, Prussia, on 27 January 1825. He was the oldest son of Heinrich Möllhausen, a military officer, and Elisabeth Möllhausen, the Baronesse von Falkenstein. His mother died when he was young and the children were left in the care of relatives while his father traveled about Europe. Financial concerns obligated him to terminate his gymnasium studies in Bonn prematurely. He worked some at agriculture in Pomerania and considered a career in the army but after his experience fighting in the Revolutions of 1848, he left Europe for America in 1849. For the next two years he roamed the frontier in Illinois and Missouri, hunting and occasionally finding work as a sign painter or court clerk.

In 1851 Möllhausen met Duke Paul Wilhelm of Württemberg, a fellow German who was setting out on a scientific expedition to the Rocky Mountains. Möllhausen asked to join the party and was brought along as a scout and draftsman for the journey across the plains to Fort Laramie. They reached the fort without issue but on the trip back they faced numerous difficulties including a prairie fire, hostile Indians and an early winter snowstorm that killed their horses and left them stranded on the prairie. Eventually a mail coach appeared with only enough room to take one of them back to civilization; the duke took the coach leaving Möllhausen to wait until help could be sent. Möllhausen spent months dealing with hostile Indians, famine, and cold. In early January, 1852 a friendly band of Otoes rescued him and several months later he reached New Orleans for a reunion with the duke.

Möllhausen stayed with the duke at his home in New Orleans for a few months and then accepted an offer from the Prussian consul in Saint Louis to accompany a shipment of zoo animals to Berlin. After an absence of nearly four years, Möllhausen returned home in January 1853.

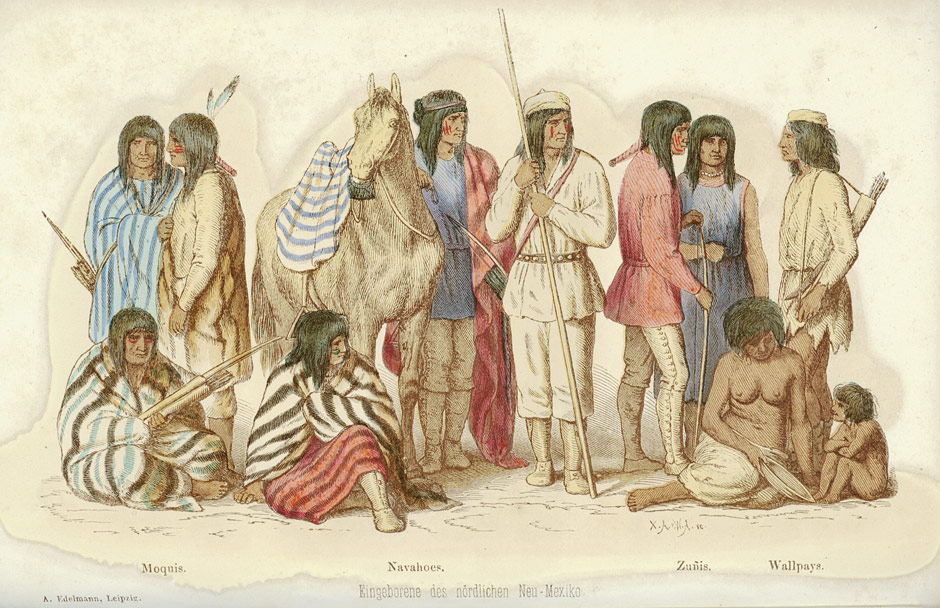
"The indigenous people of northern New Mexico" by Balduin Möllhausen, 1861.

The director of the Berlin Zoo, Hinrich Lichtenstein, introduced Möllhausen to Alexander von Humboldt and they became close friends. Humboldt served as Möllhausen's mentor and patron, encouraging his artistic talents and helping with his first efforts at writing. He also met his future wife, Carolina Alexandra Seifert, who was living at Humboldt's home. Supposedly the daughter of Humboldt's private secretary, there were rumors that Siefert was actually Humboldt's child. In any case, Humboldt showed both Siefert and Möllhausen special favor and it was his guidance that advanced Möllhausen's intellectual and professional life.

At the urging of Humboldt, Möllhausen returned to America in May 1854, carrying a letter of recommendation from his patron. In Washington D.C. he was hired as a topographer and draftsman for an expedition through the western United States to survey a possible route for a proposed transcontinental railway. Under the leadership of Lieutenant Amiel W. Whipple, the party proceeded from Fort Smith, Arkansas, along the thirty-fifth parallel to southern California. In addition to his work in topography, Möllhausen served as a naturalist and made sketches of landscapes and local inhabitants encountered along the way. Most of the illustrations published in Whipple's report were provided by Möllhausen. By March 1854, they had reached California where the group disbanded and he returned home, reaching Berlin in August 1854.

In January 1855 King Frederick William IV provided Möllhausen with a lifetime appointment as custodian of the royal libraries in and around Potsdam, a position that was created at the request of Humboldt. The sinecure left him largely free to pursue his interests in travel and writing. On 6 February 1855 he married Carolina. In 1858 he published his diary of the Whipple expedition, Tagebuch einer Reise vom Mississippi nach den Küsten der Südsee (Diary of a Journey from the Mississippi to the Coasts of the Pacific). The reception of his first book was favorable, especially with the help of Humboldt's active promotion.

In 1857 Lieutenant Joseph Christmas Ives invited Möllhausen to join his expedition to test the navigability of the Colorado River and investigate the Grand Canyon. He accepted the offer and was appointed "artist and collector in natural history." The exploring party assembled in San Francisco in October 1857 and then proceeded to Fort Yuma on the Colorado River. From there they traveled up the Colorado some 530 miles, first in a small steamer built specifically for the trip; and when the river became too shallow, they continued on foot to the Grand Canyon. After exploring the Grand Canyon, they left the river and headed east, reaching Fort Defiance where the expedition ended on May 23, 1858. Results of their exploration were presented by Ives in Report Upon the Colorado River of the West (1861). The illustrations prepared by Möllhausen for the Ives report were some of the first views of the Grand Canyon ever published.

Möllhausen left America for the last time, returning to Germany on September 1, 1858. Using his sketchbooks from the expedition he painted watercolor illustrations that he sent back to Washington for use in Ives' report. In 1861 he published an illustrated diary of his last journey, Reisen in die Felsengebirge Nord-Amerikas bis zum Hoch-Plateau von Neu-Mexico ("Traveling in the Rocky Mountains of North America up to the High Plateau of New Mexico").

For the next forty-seven years, the first twenty-eight in Potsdam, and after 1886 in Berlin, he devoted himself to writing adventure stories inspired by his experiences in America. His output over a long career was immense, at least forty-five large works in 157 volumes (including almost forty novels) and eighty novelettes in twenty-one volumes. The full extent of his output is hard to estimate—his works were published in newspapers, magazines, and anthologies by a variety of publishers. Despite the fact that America was the central focus of his writings, only his first two travel diaries were ever translated into English.

Möllhausen's first three novels--Der Halbindianer ("The Half-Breed", 1861), Der Flüchtling ("The Refugee", 1861), and Der Majordomo (1863)--form a loose trilogy and are set on the American frontier in Missouri, Louisiana, New Mexico, and California: all areas he knew intimately from his previous travels. Der Meerkönig ("The Sea-King", 1867) introduced his more typical formula, dividing each plot evenly between the New World and the Old, with Germany, Scotland, and Norway providing the backdrop for the European part of the action. He was an especially popular author in Germany from about 1860 to 1880 and became known as the German Fenimore Cooper.

Möllhausen died on 28 May 1905 in Berlin. At his request, he was buried in his old buckskin coat in which he claimed to have spent his happiest hours.

== Selected writings ==
=== Nonfiction ===
- Tagebuch einer Reise vom Mississippi nach den Küsten der Südsee ("Diary of a trip along the Mississippi to the Gulf"; Leipzig, 1858; English translation by Mrs. Sinnett: Diary of a Journey from the Mississippi to the Coasts of the Pacific with a United States Government Expedition. 2 vols. London: Longman Brown Green Longmans & Roberts, 1858; 2d German ed., entitled Wanderungen durch die Prairien und Wüsten des westlichen Nordamerika, 1860)
- Reisen in die Felsengebirge Nordamerikas bis zum Hochplateau von Neu-Mexiko ("Traveling in the Rocky Mountains of North America up to the high plateau of New Mexico"; 2 vols., Leipzig, 1861)

=== Fiction ===
- Die Halbindianer ("The Halfbreeds"; 1861)
- Der Flüchtling: Erzählung aus Neu-Mexiko (“The Refugee: A tale from New Mexico”; 1862)
- Palmblätter und Schneeflocken: Erzählung aus dem fernen Westen (“Palm leaves and snowflakes: A tale from the far west”; 2 vols., 1863)
- Der Mayordomo: Erzählung aus dem südl. Californien und Neu-Mexiko (“The majordomo: A tale from Southern California and New Mexico”; 4 vols., 1863)
- Das Mormonenmädchen (“The Mormon maiden”; 6 vols., 1864)
- Reliquien: Erzählung aus dem westlichen Nordamerika (“Relics: A tale from the west of North America”; 3 vols., Berlin, 1865)
- Die Mandanenwaise: Erzählung aus den Rheinlanden und dem Stromgebiet des Missouri (“The Mandan orphan: A tale from the Rhinelands and the Missouri River Valley”; 4 vols., 1865);
- Der Meerkönig: Eine Erzählung in 3 Abtheilungen, ("The Sea-King, 6 volumes, 1867)
- Nord und Süd: Erzählungen und Schilderungen aus dem westlichen Nordamerika (“North and South: Tales and depictions from the west of North America”; 2 vols., Jena, 1867)
- Das Monogramm (1874)
- Die beiden Yachten (“The two yachts”; 1891)
- Der Spion (“The Spy”; 1893)
- Das Fegefeuer in Frappes Wigwam (“Purgatory in Frappe's Wigwam”; 1900)

A collection of his works was published (1906–13), under title of Illustrierte Romane, Reisen und Abenteuer (“Illustrated novels, travels and adventure”).
