= William Hoffman (United States Army) =

U.S. army officer

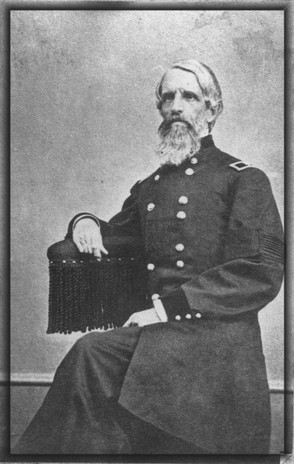
- Hoffman, c. 1861
- Born: December 2, 1807; New York City, U.S.
- Died: August 12, 1884 (aged 76); Rock Island, Illinois, U.S.
- Military career
- Allegiance: United States of America; Union
- Branch: United States Army; Union Army
- Service years: 1829–1870
- Rank: Colonel; Brevet Major General
- Units: 6th U.S. Infantry; 5th U.S. Infantry; 8th U.S. Infantry
- Commands: Commissary-General of Prisoners; 3rd U.S. Infantry
- Conflicts: See list: Black Hawk War; Second Seminole War; Mexican–American War; Siege of Veracruz; Battle of Cerro Gordo; Skirmish at Amazoque; Capture of San Antonio; Battle of Contreras; Battle of Churubusco (WIA); Battle of Molino del Rey; Battle of Chapultepec; Battle of Mexico City; First Sioux War; Utah War; Mohave War; Secession Crisis; Capture of San Antonio (POW); American Civil War

William Hoffman (1807–1884) was a 19th-century officer in the United States Army. The West Point graduate was involved in the Black Hawk War, Seminole Wars, Mexican–American War and the American Civil War. During the Civil War he served as the Commissary-General of Prisoners and set policy for the treatment and release of prisoners.

== Biography ==
=== Early life and education ===
William Hoffman Jr. was born in New York. He was the son of Lieutenant Colonel William Hoffman Sr., who fought in the War of 1812. He graduated from the United States Military Academy at West Point, New York, and was commissioned a 2nd Lieutenant in the 6th U.S. Infantry on July 1, 1829. He was a classmate of Robert E. Lee.

=== Early military career ===
Hoffman's early military career was on the frontier. Between 1829 and 1836 he was stationed at either Jefferson Barracks in Missouri or Fort Leavenworth in Kansas. In 1832 he fought in the Black Hawk War. On November 16, 1836, he was promoted to 1st Lieutenant, 6th U.S. Infantry. Hoffman then moved south to Fort Jesup and Camp Sabine in Louisiana before fighting in the Second Seminole War from 1837 to 1842. On February 1, 1838, he was promoted to captain, 6th U.S. Infantry. In 1842 he served in the Recruiting Service before being posted at Fort Smith in Arkansas. In 1846 he mustered volunteers into the military before his engagement in the Mexican–American War.

During the war with Mexico between 1846 and 1847, Hoffman was engaged in the march through Chihuahua, the Siege of Vera Cruz, the Battle of Cerro Gordo, a skirmish at Amazoque, the Capture of San Antonio, the Battle of Contreras and the Battle of Churubusco, where he was wounded. On August 20, 1847, Hoffman was brevetted to major for gallant and meritorious conduct in the Battles of Contreras and Churubusco. He was also involved in the Battle of Molino del Rey, the Battle of Chapultepec, and the Assault and Capture of Mexico City. He was brevetted a lieutenant colonel on September 8, 1847, for his gallant and meritorious conduct in the Battle of Molino del Rey.

Between the war with Mexico and the Civil War Hoffman served on recruiting duty for two years before returning to the frontier. There he was garrisoned again at Fort Leavenworth and was promoted to major, 5th U.S. Infantry, on April 15, 1851. He returned to Jefferson Barracks in 1852 and was transferred back to the 6th U.S. Infantry the same year. From 1852 to 1854 he was garrisoned at Newport Barracks in Kentucky. He returned to the frontier in 1854 with his posting at Fort Laramie in the Dakota Territory. He was involved in the Sioux Expedition of 1855, the Utah Expedition of 1858 and the March to California the same year. Hoffman relocated to California for frontier duty in the Mojave Country and Benicia, California. On October 17, 1860, he was promoted to lieutenant colonel, 8th U.S. Infantry, and was transferred to San Antonio, Texas.

=== Civil War ===
Hoffman was in San Antonio at the start of the American Civil War. He was taken as a prisoner of war by the Confederates when Brigadier General David E. Twiggs surrendered the Union command on February 18, 1861. On April 25, 1862, he was promoted to colonel, 3rd U.S. Infantry, while still a prisoner of war, and was released in a prisoner exchange on August 27, 1862.

He was reassigned to Washington, D.C. where that year he became Commissary-General of Prisoners. The Office of the Commissary-General of Prisoners had been organized on October 7, 1861, under the Quartermaster General's Department. It was made directly responsible to the Secretary of War on June 17, 1862, so when Hoffman took the position, he had access to the top of the military and political structure.

On November 11, 1864, the office was divided into an Eastern and Western Branch. Hoffman, who had been in charge of the whole office up to that date, was placed in charge of the Eastern Branch. On February 1, 1865, it was restructured as a single unit, and Hoffman was placed in charge overall again.

Over 104,000 Confederate soldiers deserted the army during the war, with a third of them surrendering to the Union army. In addition, the army captured thousands of soldiers, whom they held as prisoners of war, transferring them away from the fronts to camps set up to house them. The two governments negotiated a prisoner exchange, which operated from 1862 and 1863 before it broke down for a variety of reasons.

The Union was not prepared to handle the number of prisoners it took in and scrambled to set up facilities. On both sides, the prison camps were overcrowded, suffered food shortages and poor sanitation, and were plagued with infectious disease. In 1862 some of the Confederate prisoners of war refused to be exchanged, saying they would not return to the South.

Hoffman, working with President Abraham Lincoln and War Secretary Edwin Stanton, developed a procedure whereby Confederate prisoners of war and deserters could swear allegiance to the Union to gain their release. Release requests from Union officials, Confederate soldiers, and Southern family members came to Hoffman's office for review and evaluation. Hoffman believed deserters, because they had already renounced their military obligation to the Confederacy, provided an opportunity to "reconstruct" the rebel soldiers and undermine the Confederate war effort. Military field commanders could administer the oath of allegiance to deserters if they could verify their stories and be assured they were not spies. He believed that prisoners of war presented a problem, as they could return to their units or act as spies. They could only be released after Hoffman's staff reviewed each case individually and the release was approved by Secretary of War Stanton.

To encourage desertion, the Union started to offer incentives to Confederate soldiers, such as transportation home. Hoffman narrowed the conditions for Confederates to take the oath of allegiance, and the number of prisoners released decreased dramatically.

On October 7, 1864, Hoffman was brevetted to brigadier general for faithful and meritorious services during the Rebellion, and then brevetted to major general on March 13, 1865, for faithful, meritorious and distinguished services as Commissary-General of Prisoners during the Rebellion. He served in the post of Commissary-General until November 3, 1865.

=== Later career and death ===
After the Civil War, Hoffman was placed in command of regiments at St. Louis, Missouri, from 1865 to 1866 and Fort Leavenworth from 1866 to 1868. He was on leave from March 6, 1868, to April 26, 1869, when he became the Superintendent of the General Recruiting Service. He retired from the army on May 1, 1870, as a colonel. Hoffman retired to Rock Island, Illinois, where he married his second wife. He and his wife Mary started a school for girls there. Hoffman died in 1884.

== See also ==
- List of American Civil War brevet generals (Union)
