= David C. Robinson (steamboat captain) =

David C. Robinson (c. 1833 – 1874), was a steamboat captain on the Colorado River from 1857 to 1873.

A ships carpenter, David C. Robinson, came to the Colorado River in 1850 on the army transport schooner, Invincible, commanded by captain Alfred H. Wilcox. He accompanied Lieutenant George Derby when he attempted to reach Fort Yuma with supplies by boat. He returned in 1854 serving as mate on the crew of George Alonzo Johnson's steamboat General Jesup. He commanded the Ives steamboat Explorer on Ives' expedition up the Colorado River in 1857. Ives attributed much of the success of his expedition to Robinson's efforts.

In 1859, Robinson became captain of the George A. Johnson & Company steamboat, Cocopah. Afterwards, he ran the boatyard at Port Isabel, Sonora where he maintained the company steamboats and built the Gila, launched in January 1873 (subsequently rebuilt in 1899 as the Cochan). He quit the Colorado River later that year, moving his family to Northern California, and captained a boat on Clear Lake. He died of a lung hemorrhage on July 17, 1874, at the age of 41.
