= Cocopah II =

Colorado River steamboat

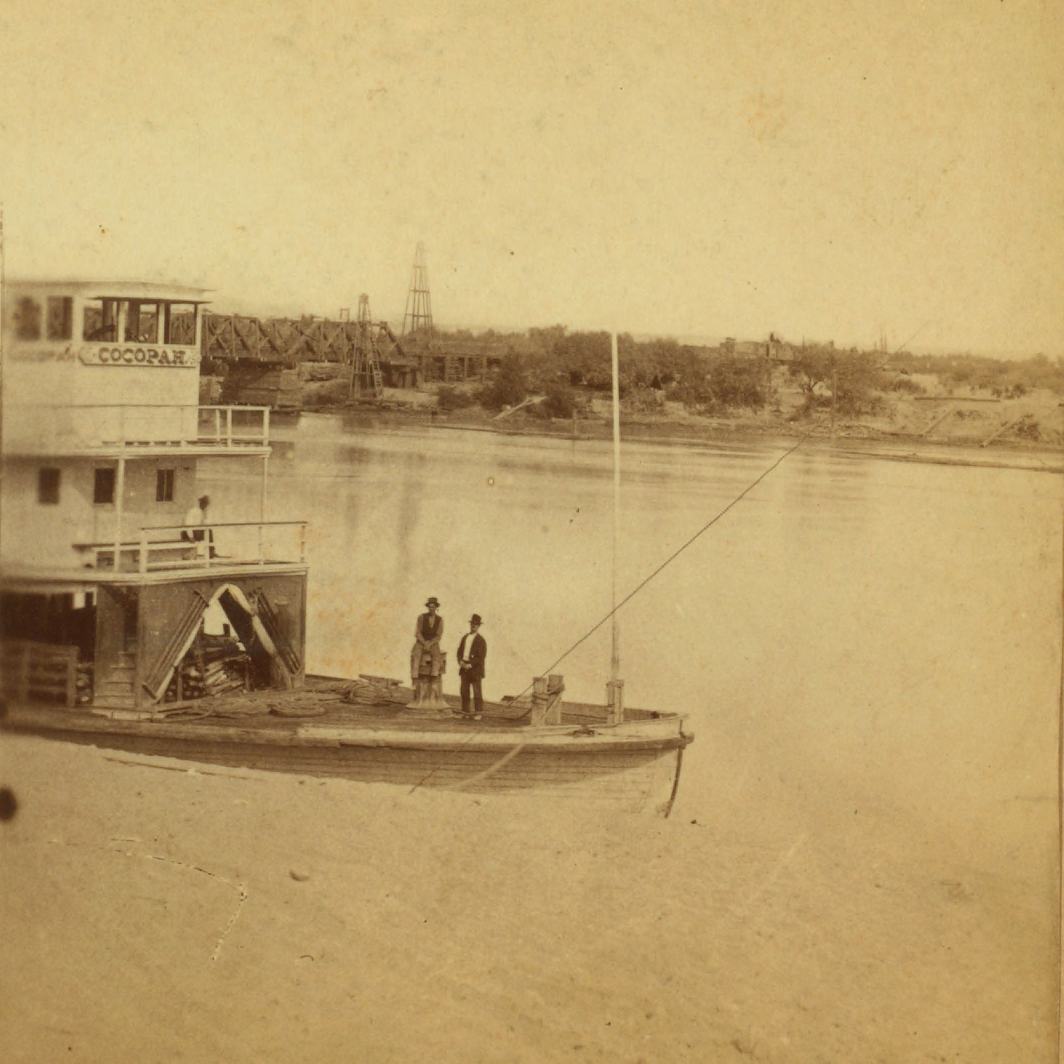
Cocopah

Cocopah II, was a stern-wheel paddle-steamer, the tenth steamboat on the Colorado River, first put on the river in 1867.

The Cocopah II was built at Arizona City in March 1867 for the George A. Johnson & Company as the replacement for the original Cocopah that had been taken off the river that year, had its engine and boiler removed and used as housing for workmen at the port and ship building settlement at Port Isabel, Sonora. The Cocopah II at 231 tons was 3 tons lighter, at 147.5 feet seven and a half feet longer and at 28 feet a foot narrower than the original Cocopah. It was commanded by Captain Issac Polhamus, senior steamboat Captain of the company.

With the Colorado II, Mohave, and Nina Tilden, Cocopah II completed George Alonzo Johnson's fleet of four steamers and six barges that would operate from the late 1860s to early 1870s. The Cocopah II was finally retired in 1879 after the Southern Pacific Railroad bridged the river at Fort Yuma and purchased the steamboat company. Cocopah II was dismantled in 1881.
