= Sierra Nevada (schooner) =

Colorado River transport boat

Sierra Nevada was a schooner, used as a transport for the U. S. Army Department of the Pacific in California to carry supplies for Fort Yuma to the mouth of the Colorado River in 1853–1854.

== History ==
The Sierra Nevada, under Captain Alfred H. Wilcox, carried contractors George Alonzo Johnson with his partner Benjamin M. Hartshorne who were making the second attempt to supply the fort up the river. The Sierra Nevada left San Francisco, stopping at San Diego, then leaving there on 25 January with troops and stores, arrived at the river's mouth in February 1852. On board were 250 tons of supplies for the newly reoccupied fort and a pair of knocked down flatboats, built by Domingo Marcucci in San Francisco. These they assembled to be poled up the Colorado. However the first barge sank with its cargo a total loss. The second was finally, after a long struggle poled up to Fort Yuma, but what little it carried was soon consumed by the garrison. Subsequently, wagons had to be sent from the fort to haul the balance of the supplies overland from the estuary through the marshes and woodlands of the Delta.

Despite this failure to supply the fort by the river, Johnson, Hartshorne and Wilcox, formed the George A. Johnson & Company and in 1854 returned with a side-wheel steamboat the General Jesup, and successfully began supplying the fort, carrying 50 tons of cargo, making round trips from the estuary to the fort in only four or five days, at a cost of $75 per ton, far lower than the $200 per ton cost of carrying it overland from San Diego.,
