= George A. Johnson & Company =

Colorado River navigation company

- Industry: Maritime transport
- Founded: 1852; 173 years ago
- Founders: George Alonzo Johnson; Benjamin M. Hartshorne; Alfred Henry Wilcox
- Defunct: 1869
- Fate: Reorganized
- Successor: Colorado Steam Navigation Company
- Area served: Colorado River

George A. Johnson & Company was a partnership between three men who pioneered navigation on the Colorado River. Benjamin M. Hartshorne, George Alonzo Johnson and Alfred H. Wilcox. The George A. Johnson & Company was formed in the fall of 1852, and was reorganized as the Colorado Steam Navigation Company in 1869.

== History ==
=== Early attempts to navigate the Colorado and formation of the partnership ===
The three partners that formed the business came from various walks of life. But all had previous experience dealing with the extreme conditions of the Colorado River during their earlier frustrated attempts to bring supplies up that river to Fort Yuma. At that time Fort Yuma was one of the most remote and difficult to reach places in the United States. It had been at first supplied from San Francisco to San Diego by sea and from there overland across the Colorado Desert at the exorbitant rate of $500 per ton.

==== Alfred H. Wilcox ====
The expense of land transport drove the Army in November 1850 to send an expedition to attempt to carry supplies from San Francisco to the Gulf of California and 150 miles up the river to the Fort. The attempt was made in the Army transport schooner, Invincible under Captain Alfred H. Wilcox, one of the future partners of the company. The expedition was commanded by Lieutenant George Derby.

The schooner arrived in San Diego to pick up the rations, then proceeded to the mouth of the Colorado River, stopping only at Cabo San Lucas and Guaymas. The Invincible arrived at the river mouth on December 25. Captain Wilcox then ascended the river but with difficulty. Invincible drawing 8 feet of water was grounded at every ebb tide which was extreme in the Colorado River Delta. The expedition encountered difficulty in the estuary of the Colorado when the Invincible was nearly sunk by the tidal bore that regularly occurred following the ebb tide there. On January 3, 1850, some 30 miles up river Captain Wilcox was forced to drop anchor, his way blocked by shoals too shallow to pass. Local Cocopah people there that day agreed to carry a message to Fort Yuma of the arrival of the ship.

After waiting without answer to their message until 11 January, Derby, who due to an old and inaccurate British chart of the river mouth, believed the fort to be nearby instead of 120 miles away and attempted to continue up the river to reach the fort with the ship's longboat. Two days later they met the fort commander, Major Samuel P. Heintzelman coming down the river in a boat. Arraignments were made to unload the ship at its anchorage on the shore of Sonora and loaded onto wagons sent from the fort on 28 January. Wilcox and Derby then returned with the Invincible to San Francisco. Lieutenant Derby, in his expedition report, recommended that a shallow draft stern-wheel steamboat would be the way to send supplies up river to the fort.

==== Hartshorne and Johnson ====
The next attempt was made by the contractors George Alonzo Johnson with his partner Benjamin M. Hartshorne who had met when they first came as partners in an enterprise to establish a ferry at the Yuma Crossing. There they built and began operating a ferry, then sold it and returned to San Francisco.

These partners got a contract to supply the fort, and arrived at the river's mouth in February 1852, on the United States transport schooner Sierra Nevada under Captain Wilcox. On board were 250 tons of supplies for the newly reoccupied fort and a pair of knocked down flatboats, built by Domingo Marcucci in San Francisco. These they assembled to be poled up the Colorado. However the first barge sank with its cargo a total loss. The second was finally, after a long struggle poled up to Fort Yuma, but what little it carried was soon consumed by the garrison. Subsequently, wagons again were sent from the fort to haul the balance of the supplies overland from the estuary through the marshes and woodlands of the Delta.

Both of these attempts on the river failed in the face of extreme tides in the estuary or strong currents, shifting sand bars or low water in the river. Hauling supplies from the estuary worked but was less satisfactory than the 185 mile San Diego route over land. Firstly it was a violation of the Treaty of Guadalupe Hidalgo for American troops to intrude into Mexican territory. Secondly, on top of already costly land shipping was the prospect of the additional expense of Mexican custom duties that would be levied on anything landed on Mexican territory.

==== Success of the Uncle Sam ====
After the failure of Hartshorne and Johnson, James Turnbull, obtained the next contract to supply the fort. He followed the recommendation of Lt. Derby, sailing with supplies and the disassembled Uncle Sam, a 65-foot long side-wheel paddle steamer tug, (also built by Domingo Marcucci), to the Colorado River Delta, in the schooner Capacity. There he had the vessel re-assembled at a landing in the delta in two months. Turnbull then successfully brought supplies up the Colorado River 120 miles in 15 days from the Colorado River Delta to Fort Yuma, where he arrived December 3, 1852. He then took some passengers from the fort up the river for a few miles as a celebration of the success before returning to bring up more supplies.

Equipped with only a 20-horsepower engine, the Uncle Sam could only carry 35 tons of supplies, It made trips for four more months up and down the river to finish carrying the supplies from the Capacity to the fort reducing its time for a round trip to 12 days. Negligence caused the Uncle Sam to sink at its dock below Fort Yuma, and was then washed away before it could be raised, in the spring flood of May 1853. Turnbull who meanwhile had returned to the Delta from San Francisco with another cargo and a more powerful engine for the Uncle Sam. Finding it lost he returned for a new hull, while the army sent wagons to recover the cargo from the delta. However, Turnbull disappeared from San Francisco, leaving creditors unpaid. However, Turnbull had shown the worth of steamboats to solve Fort Yuma's supply problem and to successfully navigate the Colorado River, an example that was soon followed by George Alonzo Johnson and his partners.

=== Beginning and growth of the business ===
==== George A. Johnson & Company established ====
In late 1852, George Alonzo Johnson with his partner Hartshorne and new partner Captain Wilcox (formerly of the Invincible and "Sierra Nevada"), formed George A. Johnson & Company. Turnbull's financial debacle allowed them to obtain the next contract to supply the fort. Johnson and his partners, all having learned a lesson from their failed attempts ascending the Colorado and with the example of the Uncle Sam, brought the parts of a more powerful side-wheel steamboat, the General Jesup, with them to the mouth of the Colorado from San Francisco. There it was reassembled at a landing in the upper tidewater of the river and reached Fort Yuma, January 18, 1854. This new boat, capable of carrying 50 tons of cargo, was very successful making round trips from the estuary to the fort in only four or five days. Costs were cut to $75 per ton. The route made the Company $4,000 per trip per ship in the estuary of the Colorado River.

A second reason for the speed of the new steamboat beside its powerful engine was the establishment of wood-yard landings along the river between the delta and Fort Yuma by associates contracted by the company. The landings sprang up to supply wood for the steamboats, so the crew would not need to gather wood as they proceeded up river, as the crew of the Uncle Sam had been obliged to do. These landings were each located at about the distance a steamboat could travel up and down river each day on that section of river. Steamboats did not travel at night, due to the danger of running onto sandbars or into snags on the ever-changing river. The boats would be re supplied with cut wood at the landings while tied up overnight. The wood-yards were owned by Yankee's, who hired the Cocopah from local rancherias, to cut the wood (usually cottonwood or mesquite), transport it to the wood-yards and load it onto the boats. Cocopah men often also served as deck hands on the boats, having lived along and on the river for a lifetime, they were well qualified to spot river hazards in a timely manner.

==== Growth of the business ====
In August 1854, while trying to make time up river against the current, the boiler of the General Jesup exploded, killing her engineer, named Jackson, and seriously scalding two others. By December 1854, the boat was running again, with new machinery sent down from San Francisco. In an era where boiler explosions were common, this was the only such incident seen in Johnson's company or its successors until the end of steam navigation on the Colorado.

From 1853, ranches were developed nearby up river to supply the fort with beef and barley. That same year gold was found up river. By 1854, copper mines were developed along the river 40 miles above Fort Yuma. The ore provided George A. Johnson & Company with their first commercial cargo to take to the estuary anchorage. Old Mexican mines where reopened in the interior of the Gadsden Purchase that increased the traffic bringing in machinery and shipping out ore. By 1855, the volume of cargo necessitated putting another boat on the river. By December 1855, Johnson had John G. North build and bring in sections a new steamboat from San Francisco to the Delta estuary. There North assembled and launched the 120-foot-long, 80 hp, wood-hulled Colorado. It was capable of carrying 70 tons of cargo while drawing only 2 feet of water and was the first stern-wheeler on the river.

Once the backlog of cargo was relieved by the Colorado, Johnson looked for ways to keep his boats from being idle. He knew that Brigham Young wanted to establish a route to the Mormon settlements in Utah from the sea up the Colorado River and that merchant interests had been interested in establishing trade with the Mormons by the river route since 1852 when the Uncle Sam came to the river. Additionally there was the claim that the river was navigable by steamboat as far as the Virgin River by the fur trapper Antoine Leroux who had successfully rafted down the Colorado from the Virgin River in 1837. Johnson was instrumental in getting Congressional funding for a military expedition to explore the Colorado River above Fort Yuma in 1856. Johnson lent Ives one of his men David C. Robinson as a pilot for the expedition. However, cut out of providing the steamboat for the 1857 expedition of Lt. Ives, Johnson at his own expense took the lead in the General Jesup heading up river first, exploring the river up to a point 8 miles into Pyramid Canyon to its first rapids, now under Lake Mohave, between Arizona and Nevada.

Despite the successful exploration up the river, the lands along the upper river did not begin to be settled until after the 1858-59 Mohave War and the establishment of Fort Mohave. The General Jesup and the newer stern-wheeler Colorado where engaged to carry troops and supplies up river for the Mohave Expeditions at $500 per day, and thereafter contracted to support the army posts of Camp Gaston and Camp Mohave, later Fort Mohave. Support of Fort Mohave became the first economic incentive for the steamboats up river. This was soon followed by the support of settlements created by the rush to various gold, silver and copper mining locations near the river in the next decades.

With the discovery of the Gila Placers by Jacob Snively came the first Arizona gold rush in 1858–1859, which created the ephemeral Gila City just east of Fort Yuma on the Gila River. Early in 1859, placer gold was found eighteen miles above Fort Yuma at the Pot Holes on the west bank of the Colorado River in California. In August 1859 Johnson retired the General Jesup and replaced it with the 140 foot Stern-wheeler Cocopah. Its shallow 19 inch draft and stern-wheel was better suited to transit the upper Colorado route, and was the model for all the steamboats on the river thereafter. In 1860, gold was found in placers at La Laguna. In April 1861, as the American Civil War began, word got out that silver and gold lodes had been discovered by John Moss and others in El Dorado Canyon, sixty five miles above Fort Mohave near what was then considered the high water limit of navigation. George A. Johnson came up river and made a deal to supply the mines with his steamboats at $100 a ton, a lower price than the $240 a ton charged for overland freight across the Mohave Desert from Los Angeles.

===== Civil War on the Colorado River =====
In response to the establishment of Confederate Arizona, California Volunteers of the Union Army took control of the Yuma ferries, built up the garrison and provisions at Fort Yuma and strengthened its fortifications, all with supplies brought from San Francisco with the aid of Johnson's steamboats. The California Column launched its campaign to cut off the Confederate Army of the New Mexico Campaign and retake Confederate Arizona in 1862, and based its subsequent occupation of New Mexico Territory on its depot in Arizona City, again provisioned by Johnson's steamboats. When Fort Mohave was reoccupied by California Volunteers in 1864 it was supplied as before by Johnson's steamboats. These Federal contracts were the base of Johnson's revenue but it was soon greatly supplemented by a mining boom along the Colorado and in the interior of Arizona.

In January 1862, Pauline Weaver discovered gold while trapping along the Arizona side of the Colorado River 130 miles above Fort Yuma. After he brought a crew of Sonorans from Gila City to dry wash the site with good results, the rush to what became the La Paz Mining District began, with new strikes being found within 20 miles to the east and south of the original strike near what came to be the town of La Paz.

The Pyramid Mining District east of El Dorado Canyon and the river in the Black Mountains and in the vicinity of Fort Mohave the San Francisco Mining District northeast of the fort in the Black Mountains were established in 1863. The Sacramento Mining District 37 miles from Fort Mohave were established by soldiers in September 1863, to the east beyond the Black Mountains in the southern end of the Cerbat Mountains. A party led by John Moss founded the Waubau Yuma Mining District in the Hualapai Mountains 50 miles east of Fort Mohave. West of the fort in the Providence Mountains of California, silver was found and the Rock Springs Mining District was established in April 1863 and the Macedonia Mining District in September 1864. Soldiers from Fort Mohave established the Irataba Mining District in early 1863 when they found copper five miles west of the river in the Dead Mountains of California. First the landing at Mohave City was founded near Fort Mohave. Then Irataba City, followed in January 1864 but it was supplanted when the ferry and landing of Hardyville was established in March 1864, to serve these mines, supported by Johnson's steamboat company.

North of La Paz a copper strike 12 miles east of the river led to organization of the Williams Fork Mining District with its landing at Aubrey City. Copper was also found west of Aubrey City and the river in California, in the Freeman Mining District, and southeast of Aubrey City in the Harcuvar Mining District named for the Harcuvar Mountains 35 miles east of the river and 55 miles northeast of La Paz and a few miles north of the La Paz - Wikenburg Road. New placers were found in the fall of 1862, 50 miles south of La Paz on the California side of the river in the Picacho Mining District with Reliance Landing serving it 47 miles up river from Fort Yuma. Across the river in Arizona gold was found in the Castle Dome Mountains to the north of it silver-lead ore was found which created the Castle Dome Mining District in spring of 1863. Castle Dome Landing was established to serve this district. In 1864, silver and gold were found in the Eureka Mining District 40 miles north of Fort Yuma across the river from the Picacho District in the Chocolate Mountains. It was served by the Williamsport landing 47 miles up river from Fort Yuma.

In the interior of Arizona above the Gila River Fort Whipple was established and gold mines, mining camps and the towns of Prescott and Wickenburg boomed in the mining districts of Agua Frio, Big Bug, Bradshaw, Hassyampa, Turkey Creek, Walnut Grove, Weaver, Wikenburg and Yavapai. These were also all primarily supplied by the La Paz - Wikenburg Road and Hardyville - Prescott Road from those landings on the Colorado River.

The Colorado River Gold Rush had made George A. Johnson and his partners rich. Johnson and Wilcox married into Californio ranchero families. Johnson acquired Rancho Peñasquitos, went into politics and was elected to the California legislature for San Diego in 1862. Wilcox became a banker in San Diego and lived at Rancho Melijo. Hartshorne who was president of the company operating the business from San Francisco, invested his new wealth in the California Steam Navigation Company, and became its president in 1865. Management of the steamboat fleet at the river was delegated to Issac Polhamus its senior captain. However the Colorado River business based on government contracts for the military was now being overwhelmed by the trade from the mines and settlements dependent on the river. Worse, the Johnson Company had failed to increase its carrying capacity on the river. Despite rebuilding the worn Colorado I into the larger Colorado II in 1862, Johnson still only had two steamboats on the river as they had from 1859.

=== Opposition lines, competition and monopoly ===
==== Opposition Lines Arise 1863–1864 ====
By late 1863, supplies for the mines and settlements were piling up on ships at anchor in the Delta or on the dock in Arizona City, not getting through in sufficient volume to prevent shortages and cause prices up river and in the interior to skyrocket. Ore from the mines to be shipped out to be processed was piling up on the docks of the landings along the river.

The Cocopah made round trips up river from Arizona City to the La Paz landings during the high water mouths of May and June at its full capacity of sixty tons of freight in four days, amounting to four hundred tons a month. However, as the river level subsequently declined the trips became slower and could carry less cargo. By December Cocopah could only manage eighty tons a month, barely able to make only two trips with forty tons in that time. Trips farther up river to the vicinity of Fort Mohave took at least twice as long. The same difficulty plagued the Colorado carrying cargo between the estuary and Arizona City. By the fall of 1863 there was a backlog of twelve hundred tons of freight at Arizona City or in ships anchored in the estuary waiting to be brought up river. Between ten and fifty tons of ore waiting to be brought down to the estuary at each of the landings up river above Arizona City. Some of this cargo had been waiting for couple of months and most would have to wait until May and the rise of the Colorado.

From the beginning the Johnson Company rates were considered excessive compared to those on other Western rivers. Additionally merchants at La Paz 280 miles up river objected to the $75 per ton charged by the Johnson Company, while Williamsport 80 miles down river paid only $25 per ton. Now in the summer and fall of 1863 as merchants upriver rapidly ran out of goods and prices rose astronomically. Steamboat captains and their officers took advantage of the situation by purchasing needed goods on their own account then carried them up river to sell for a quick profit at the now inflated prices, leaving behind identical shipments consigned to the merchants. However even these shipments ended in November when an extreme fall in the river left the Cocopah stranded on a sandbar thirty miles above La Paz.

Merchants and miners held a protest meeting at La Paz on December 1, 1863. It condemned the Johnson Company as a monopoly, that was trying to drive the miners out in order to gain control of the mines. The meeting voted to send a representative to San Francisco with a petition calling for the establishment of an opposition steamboat line on the Colorado River. In San Francisco, their representative Samuel "Steamboat" Adams convinced the Chamber of Commerce to endorse a rival line. Merchants of the city raised $25,000 by subscription, and Adams persuaded Captain Thomas Trueworthy, to send the steamboat Esmerelda under Captain Charles C. Overman and the Victoria, a four-masted schooner converted from a barge, to the Colorado River to establish the Union Line there. The Victoria was to be a store ship at the mouth of the river, but she was soon broken up by the tidal bore soon after it reached the mouth of the Colorado in March.

After Overman arrived at the river mouth he built the Black Crook, first tow barge to be used on the Colorado River. Of a type commonly used on the San Francisco Bay and Sacramento River and its tributaries, the barge was 128 x 28 feet capable of carrying 100 tons of freight. These barges were towed on a 100-foot cable secured to a short mast atop the steamboat amid-ship to avoid fouling with the stern-wheel. Each barge had a helmsman that steered the barge in the wake of the boat towing it. In early May, Trueworthy took the Esmerelda up river for the first time with the Black Crook in tow making it to Fort Yuma in three days, eight hours.

With Johnson Company raising freight rates to and from his mines in El Dorado Canyon and the Freeman District in late 1863, and with the potential freighting profits to be made competing with it, Alphonso F. Tilden, of the Philadelphia Silver and Copper Mining Company, put a second Opposition steamboat on the river, the Nina Tilden. Built in San Francisco by Martin Vice and launched in July 1864, it was able to do 16 knots while it carried 120 tons and would tow a 100-ton barge. A veteran captain of the Sacramento and Fraser Rivers, George B. Gorman, steamed the Nina Tilden down the coast to the Colorado River. In September, Gorman also began to compete with the Johnson Company and the Union Line, towing the barge White Fawn, knocked down and shipped in a schooner to the estuary where it was reassembled.

==== Competition 1864–1866 ====
Once Johnson realized the seriousness of the situation he ordered a new steamboat, Mohave that would be ready in May 1864. In the meanwhile he got control of as much of the cargo being held up in the estuary as he could by means of using his boats shipping it a short way up river from the estuary to the landing at Gridiron, whereby he obtained a lien on the cargo so his competitors could not take it. This left his competitors with less idled freight to carry and needing agents from San Francisco to ship new freight through them, instead of to Johnson & Company. Johnson also bought out most of the wood at the woodyard landings along the river so his opposition would be slowed by the necessity to have to gather up their own firewood or establish their own system of wood-yards. The Johnson Company also cut shipping charges to La Paz landing to $40 a ton, in an attempt to pacify the merchants there.

Additionally, "Steamboat" Adams accused Johnson & Company of sending men to attack Esmeralda by damaging her machinery, setting fires, cutting her moorings and attempting to wreck her with floating logs. Her owner Trueworthy, complained Johnson's pressure on insurance brokers in San Francisco prevented him from getting insurance on his boat and cargo.

Soon after the Esmeralda and its barge began running on the river, the Mohave was launched in May giving Johnson 3 boats to carry goods, just as the flood waters came making rapid and heavily laden trips possible. By September, the Nina Tilden, was also carrying goods up river, making 5 boats and 2 barges that soon ended the backlog of freight, producing its opposite condition, boats sitting idle by the fall of 1864. Cushioned by their government contracts Johnson & Company was not as vulnerable, but Tilden and Trueworthy needed more commercial revenue to make a go of it.

The only new business to be had by the opposition was to service the settlements Utah, up river at a landing called Callville cutting costs of transportation by $100 a ton, one third of the cost of the overland route from Los Angeles. Trueworthy proposed to do this at all times of the year, and tried to take the Esmerelda there in early 1865, towing a barge loaded with merchandise and timber, but turned back at the Roaring Rapids in Black Canyon, when word came that his buyers had left Callville. Trueworthy had to tie up his boat at El Dorado Canyon and ride to Salt Lake City to sell his cargo. Johnson associate William Harrison Hardy had succeeded in getting there first, leaving January 2, poling and sailing (when the wind was favorable) a 50 by 8 foot flat boat "Arizona" 90 miles from Hardyville to Callville in 12 days.

==== Consolidation 1866–1867 ====
In the summer of 1865, Esmerelda of the Union Line, was consolidated with the other rival boat Tilden's Nina Tilden, into the Pacific and Colorado Steam Navigation Company, also headed by Thomas E. Trueworthy, with backing from San Francisco financiers. Trueworthy tried again to reach Callville during the high water in the summer of 1866. Esmeralda with a barge and ninety tons of freight, under Trueworthy's former first mate Captain Robert T. Rogers. After three months, the Esmeralda reached the landing at Callville on October 8, 1866. She was slowed by lack of firewood and (at what became known as the Ringbolt Rapids), with insufficient power to ascend the rapids, a ringbolt had had to be set in the canyon wall and the boat pulled through with a line run to her capstan. Despite her triumph at reaching the new "head of navigation" at Callvile, Esmerelda upon her return to Arizona City, was seized by the Sheriff of Yuma County, for debts owned by Thomas E. Trueworthy's company. She passed through the hands of Arizona Navigation Company, another company the creditors tried to form hoping to salvage the opposition steamboat business but that failed.

==== Monopoly 1867–1869 ====
When the last attempt of salvaging the Opposition steamboat line failed, Esmerelda and Nina Tilden were sold in the fall of 1867, to George A. Johnson & Company. Underpowered and small for the Colorado River, the company had the boat dismantled in 1868. The Nina Tilden continued in use on the river, until she was retired to Port Isabel in 1873. In 1869, the company was reorganized with an infusion of more capital and with additional partners, as the Colorado Steam Navigation Company.

== See also ==
- Steamboat transport on the Colorado River
