= Philips Point (Sonora) =

Coordinates: 31°46′00″N 114°42′27″W

Philips Point was a promontory on the north east bank of the Colorado River in the Mexican state of Sonora that marked the mouth of the tidal estuary of the Colorado River in the later 19th century.

"Philips Point may be regarded as the head of deep-water navigation in the Colorado River. At Philips Point spring tides rise 25 to 30 feet, and neap tides from 16 to 20 feet. At a short distance above Philips Point, the spring tide comes in with a bore or bank of water 4 feet high, extending in one huge breaker clear across the river, while the ebb is still running out. The influence of the tide in the Colorado River is felt for about 40 miles up the river, a few miles above Heintzelman's Point."

== History ==
In the mid-19th century, Philips Point also marked the minor southeastern trending distributary channel of the Colorado River. It was divided from the western main channel of the river and the Gulf of California by Montague Island and Gore Island.

It was the deep waters of this side channel at the mouth of Port Isabel Slough that was the anchorage for the steamships visiting Port Isabel, and where they transferred their passengers and cargoes to steamboats and barges of the Colorado Steam Navigation Company between 1871 and 1877.
