= Port Isabel Slough =

Land feature of Colorado River within Sonora, Mexico

Port Isabel Slough was a deep slough in the Colorado River Delta near the mouth of the Colorado River during the 19th century, within the state of Sonora, Mexico.

== History ==
Until the Great Flood of 1862, what became Port Isabel Slough was a shallow tidewater slough, but the extreme flood waters of that year cut its channel much deeper, so that at low tide it still was three fathoms deep. The mouth of this slough was only 5 miles from the mouth of the river and 2 miles east of the main river at Philips Point, in the 1870s located at 31°46′10.4″N 114°43′30.8″W, marking the head of the eastern dis-tributary channel of the Colorado, separated from the main river and the Gulf of California by Montague Island and Gore Island. The slough was sheltered from the extremes of the tidal bore of the Colorado River and deep enough to prevent stranding on shoals or mud flats at low tide. This made it an ideal anchorage for maritime craft to load and unload their cargo and passengers from the steamboats that took them up and down river without the danger from the tides that they were having to risk in the estuary at Robinson's Landing.

In the month of March 1865, the schooner Isabel, from San Francisco, commanded by W. H. Pierson, found and entered this slough and discharged her cargo, to a steamboat there for the first time. Subsequently, in June 1865, the Isabel and the brig Laura, unloaded cargoes there again, and the head of the George A. Johnson & Company, George Alonzo Johnson, and his manager Captain Issac Polhamus were there and saw the value of the waterway and named the slough for the Isabel.

Subsequently, the steamers and sailing ships and later ocean going steamships loaded and off loaded their cargoes there and the steamboat company established Port Isabel 2 1/2 miles above the mouth of the slough. Three miles above Port Isabel was Shipyard Slough, another slough tributary to Port Isabel Slough which became the site of the company tidal dry dock and shipyard, as tidal conditions were ideal for flooding and draining the dry dock there.

In 1876, Captain Polhamus advertised for a company that would cut a channel for 5 miles from the Colorado River to Port Isabel Slough to cut the distance traveled by the steamers to the port. However, the plan came to naught, when the Southern Pacific Railroad bought out the company and bridged the Colorado River at Yuma, Arizona in 1877. Subsequently, the port supplanted by the rail-head at Yuma, was abandoned in 1878.
