= Alfred Henry Wilcox =

American sea captain and businessman (1823-1883)

- Born: 1823; Chatham, now East Hampton, Connecticut, United States
- Died: 1883 (aged 59–60); San Francisco
- Occupations: Sea captain and businessman
- Known for: Pioneer in the Colorado River steamship trade and director of the California & Mexican Steam Ship Line
- Spouse: Maria Antonio Arguello (m. 1863)
- Children: Three

Alfred Henry Wilcox (1823-1883), sea captain, later Colorado River pioneer and steamboat and steamship entrepreneur, partner in the George A. Johnson & Company and of the Colorado Steam Navigation Company, banker and director of the California & Mexican Steam Ship Line.

== Early life ==
Wilcox was born in Chatham, now East Hampton, Connecticut in 1823. Becoming a sea captain in connection with the hydrographic service of the government.

=== California ===
In 1848, when he first came to California around Cape Horn, his ship brought California's first lighthouse. In 1849, taking command of the 120-ton topsail schooner Invincible, Wilcox carried U. S. Army engineers to San Diego with the aim to divert the San Diego River from its outlet in San Diego Bay into False Bay, (now Mission Bay). Upon his return to San Francisco he was ordered to carry relief supplies for starving 49ers on the wagon trails to California, up river to Sacramento.

Colorado River transport

On November 1, 1850, the Invincible was sent from San Francisco on a mission to deliver 10,000 rations to the garrison of the remote post of Fort Yuma on the Colorado River. Captain Wilcox was in command of the 12–man crew, and Lt. George H. Derby was in command of the mission to see if the rations could be delivered by the schooner up the Colorado River from the Gulf of California. Up to this time Fort Yuma had been supplied over land from San Diego, across the coastal mountains and the Colorado Desert. This route was proving difficult and expensive, leading to a ration shortage at the fort.

The schooner arrived in San Diego to pick up the rations, then proceeded to the mouth of the Colorado River, stopping only at Cabo San Lucas and Guaymas. The Invincible arrived at the river mouth on December 25. Captain Wilcox then ascended the river but with difficulty. Invincible drawing 8 feet of water was grounded at every ebb tide which was extreme in the Colorado River Delta. On January 3, 1850, some 30 miles up river Captain Wilcox was forced to drop anchor, his way blocked by shoals too shallow to pass. Local Cocopah people there that day agreed to carry a message to Fort Yuma of the arrival of the ship.

After waiting without answer to their message until 11 January, Derby, who due to an old and inaccurate British chart of the river mouth, believed the fort to be nearby instead of 120 miles away and attempted to continue up the river to reach the fort with the ship's longboat. Two days later they met the fort commander, Major Samuel P. Heintzelman coming down the river in a boat. Arraignments were made to unload the boats at the ship's anchorage on the shore of Sonora and loaded onto wagons from the fort on 28 January. The Invincible returned to San Francisco. Subsequently, Wilcox was for many years stationed at San Diego.

In late 1852, Captain Wilcox joined George Alonzo Johnson and his partner Benjamin M. Hartshorne to form the George A. Johnson & Company and obtain the next contract to supply the fort. Wilcox and his partners, all having learned a lesson from their failed attempts ascending the Colorado and with the successful example of the Uncle Sam, brought the parts of a more powerful side-wheel steamboat, the General Jesup, with them to the mouth of the Colorado from San Francisco. There it was reassembled at a landing in the upper tidewater of the river and reached Fort Yuma, January 18, 1854. This new boat, capable of carrying 50 tons of cargo, was very successful making round trips from the estuary to the fort in only four or five days. Costs were cut to $75 per ton versus the $500 per ton cost of shipping over land.

As a result of the mining boom along the Colorado River and in the interior of Arizona Territory from 1861 to 1864, and the resulting profits of his steamboat company, Wilcox was becoming wealthy. On April 16, 1863, Wilcox married Maria Antonio Arguello one of the daughters of Santiago E. Arguello and moved south of San Diego, to a new house overlooking San Diego Bay, on the Rancho La Punta one of the Arguello family ranchos, on the road to what is now Tijuana, Mexico. Wilcox and his wife had a son and two daughters.

Wilcox enjoyed sailing and in 1865 acquired a catboat and enlarged it to sloop rigging, as the Yacht Restless which he would sail up and down the bay between his Rancho La Punta and the city of San Diego.

== Later life, ranching, banking and steamships ==
Two years after the competition of opposition steamboats was defeated and a monopoly on the river was achieved in 1867, the George A. Johnson and Company brought in more partners and created the California Steam Navigation Company, which now included a steamship line that ran from San Francisco to connect with their steamboats at their port and shipyard at the mouth of the Colorado River at Port Isabel, Sonora. This move doubled the revenue of the company.

That same year Wilcox purchased Rancho Santa Ysabel and eventually ran the largest sheep herd in San Diego County. The following year the Julian Gold Rush began near Wilcox's ranch. In 1872, Wilcox financed a wagon toll road to the gold fields from San Diego that was not only shorter than the old wagon road but also enabled heavy equipment to be brought to the mines. Wilcox also joined in organizing the Commercial Bank of San Diego, and was a director and its president. A few years later it was consolidated with another bank.

On May 21, 1877, just as the railroad reached the Colorado River, Wilcox and his partners had sold out their interest in the Colorado Steam Navigation Company to the Western Development Company, a holding company for the owners of the Southern Pacific Railroad. Wilcox, Hartshorne and another partner John Bermingham, kept the steamship SS Newbern, and formed the California & Mexican Steamship Line to continue the still profitable portion of the coastal trade between San Francisco and the ports of La Paz, Mazatlán and Guaymas in Mexico.

In 1879, Captain Wilcox moved from San Diego to San Francisco. Four years later, he died from a complication of several diseases he had been suffering from for several years, on August 15, 1883.
