= Benjamin M. Hartshorne =

American businessman (1826–1902)

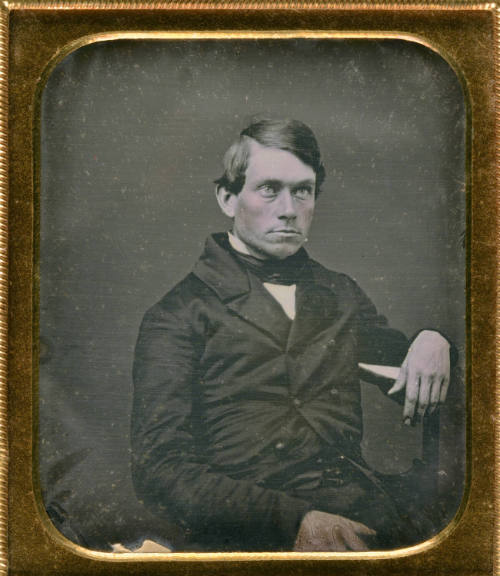
- Daguerreotype of Hartshorne, c. 1850
- Born: 7 May 1826; Highlands, New Jersey, United States
- Died: 21 March 1902 (aged 75)
- Occupation: Businessman

Benjamin Minturn Hartshorne (May 7, 1826 – March 21, 1902) was an American businessman who rose to prominence during the California Gold Rush. He was involved in Sacramento River and Colorado River steamboats as well as maritime shipping.

== Early life ==
Benjamin Minturn Hartshorne was born on May 7, 1826, in Highlands, New Jersey. He was the son of Robert Hartshorne.

== Business in California ==
Hartshorne moved to California in 1849 and became involved in the ferry business at the Yuma Crossing on the Colorado River with George Alonzo Johnson and other partners from San Francisco.

Seeing the opportunity in bringing supplies to the isolated post of Fort Yuma, Hartshorne and Johnson sold out to their other partners in the Yuma ferry and returned to San Francisco in 1852. The two men then contracted to carry supplies up the Colorado in poled barges, but this endeavor failed due to the strong current and many sandbars in the river. After a steam tug, the 20 horsepower Uncle Sam, was successfully used to ascend the river in 1853, Johnson formed the George A. Johnson & Company. Hartshorne was employed as a shipping agent in San Francisco and another partner Captain Alfred H. Wilcox, who was an experienced sea captain, was taken on for his experience in the hazards of the Colorado River Delta.

The company brought the disassembled side-wheel steamboat General Jesup to the Colorado River Delta and assembled it with a more powerful 70 hp engine. There Johnson began successfully shipping cargo and carrying passengers on the Colorado River from its estuary, up to Fort Yuma. This steamboat carried 50 tons of cargo to the fort in five days and brought the cost to supply the fort down to $75 a ton from the $500 a ton to ship cargo overland across the desert from San Diego. The route made the company $4,000 per trip per ship in the estuary of the Colorado River.

As the only steamboat company on the Colorado River, Johnson and his partners became wealthy after the discovery of gold along the Colorado River in 1858. Hartshorne, who was president of the company operating the business from San Francisco, invested his new wealth in the California Steam Navigation Company, becoming its vice-president by 1863 and its president in 1865. In 1869, George A. Johnson & Company was incorporated with additional partners as the Colorado Steam Navigation Company with Hartshorne as its president.

== Later life ==
After both his companies were bought out by the railroads, Hartshorne returned to the family estate in Monmouth County, New Jersey, in 1878. Hartshorne died in 1902.

== Family ==
Hartshorne married Julia Norton, a native of Buffalo, New York who moved to San Francisco the previous year in 1862. They had three children. In 1869, shortly after returning from family visit back to the Hartshorne estates in New Jersey, Julia Norton Hartshorne fell ill and died at the age of 30.
