= Cocopah I =

Steamboat of the Colorado River

Cocopah, was a stern-wheel paddle-steamer, the fifth steamboat on the Colorado River, first put on the river in August 1859.

The Cocopah was built in 1859 for the George A. Johnson & Company in San Francisco for $35,000. It was the largest steamboat yet used on river being 140 feet long and 29 feet wide, with a powerful engine that could carry up to 100 tons of cargo upriver against strong currents in the river. Additionally it had a draft of a mere 19 inches, with a full cargo, making it ideal for dealing with the snags and sandbars of the river especially in the low water time of the year. Cocopah was built to replace Johnson's first steamboat, the side-wheeler General Jesup.

The Cocopah was disassembled and brought down from San Francisco to the mouth of the Colorado River then unloaded onto a steamboat and taken up river to be reassembled at Gridiron Landing in Sonora. It was launched there in August 1859. It was subsequently captained by David C. Robinson, a long time employee of Johnson's, who had recently captained the Explorer in an exploration of the Colorado River over 500 miles up river above Fort Yuma to the mouth of Las Vegas Wash (now under Las Vegas Bay, Nevada).

The Cocopah remained in use on the Colorado until 1867, when it had its boiler and engine removed and was hauled out onto the bank to serve as housing for workmen at the port and ship building settlement at Port Isabel, Sonora.
