= Colorado II =

Colorado II may refer to:

- FEC v. Colorado Republican Federal Campaign Committee (2001), a United States Supreme Court case
- Colorado II (sternwheeler), a boat
