= Colorado I (sternwheeler) =

Stern-wheel paddle-steamer

Colorado, was a stern-wheel paddle-steamer, the third steamboat on the Colorado River, and first stern-wheel steamboat put on that river, in December 1855.

The Colorado was a 120 foot long, stern-wheel steamboat, built for the George A. Johnson & Company in San Francisco by John G. North a well known builder of steamboats in California. It was equipped with an 80-horsepower steam engine capable of carrying up to 70 tons of cargo while drawing only 2 feet of water. North subsequently disassembled and shipped in sections by sea to the estuary of the Colorado River. There North unloaded, reassembled and launched in it in December, 1855 under the command of Captain Isaac Polhamus. More powerful than Johnson's first steamboat, the side-wheeler General Jesup, it made faster runs between the estuary and Fort Yuma with larger cargoes against strong currents in the river. As a stern-wheeler it was narrower, with a lesser draft, so was better equipped to avoid or pass over sandbars and through the narrower sloughs that sometimes occurred on the ever-changing course of the old Colorado River Delta. Besides running cargoes between Fort Yuma from the estuary, it was used with the General Jesup to carry supplies and soldiers up river during the 1858-59 Mohave War and for the establishment of Fort Mohave. The steamboats were engaged to carry the troops and supplies up river for at $500 per day.

At the end of its service life the first Colorado's hull was dismantled in April, 1862. Its engine and boiler was removed and used to equip the new, larger stern-wheeler Colorado that was built and launched under the guns of Fort Yuma, in Arizona City, for fear of an attack by Confederate raiders.
