= Gore Island =

Gore Island may refer to:

- Gore Island (Queensland) in Australia
- Gore Island (Baja California) in Mexico
