= Heintzelman's Point =

Bend in the Colorado River in Mexico

Heintzelman's Point, a sharp bend in the Colorado River, 47 miles from the mouth of the Colorado River at the top of the influence of the tide in the estuary of the Colorado River Delta during the 19th century, in Sonora, Mexico.

== History ==
Heintzelman's Point was named after Major Samuel P. Heintzelman who was in command of Fort Yuma at the time the name was given to the point during the first expedition to bring supplies up the river by Lieutenant George Derby with the schooner, Invincible. Derby attempting to ascend the river in his longboat met the Major descending the Colorado in his boat at the point.
