= Capacity (schooner) =

Merchant ships of the United States

Capacity was an American schooner that arrived in San Francisco on January 9, 1852. The Capacity under Captain Driscoll, subsequently was hired by Captain James Turnbull to carry a cargo of U. S. Army supplies for Fort Yuma. It would also carry the engine, boiler and wood to assemble the side-wheel paddle steamer tug, Uncle Sam to the Colorado River Delta. The Uncle Sam would be the first of many steamboats on the Colorado River.

After arriving in early September, the Capacity then had to wait longer than expected, over two months, in the anchorage in the estuary of the river until the Uncle Sam was built and launched in mid-November and then again waited four more months to empty its hold of the Army supplies. The anchorage was a trial for a ship anchored in that location, subject to extreme tides that left the ship stranded at low tide and struck by a 4 to 6 foot tidal bore when the tide came back in twice a day. The long wait was due to the limited 35 ton cargo capacity and the weakness of the 20hp engine of the tug when pitted against the strong down stream current of the Colorado, that made a round trip to and from its destination at Fort Yuma take 12 days each. The Capacity was successfully unloaded and left the river. The subsequent fate of the Capacity is unknown.
