= Colorado II (sternwheeler) =

Colorado River steamboat

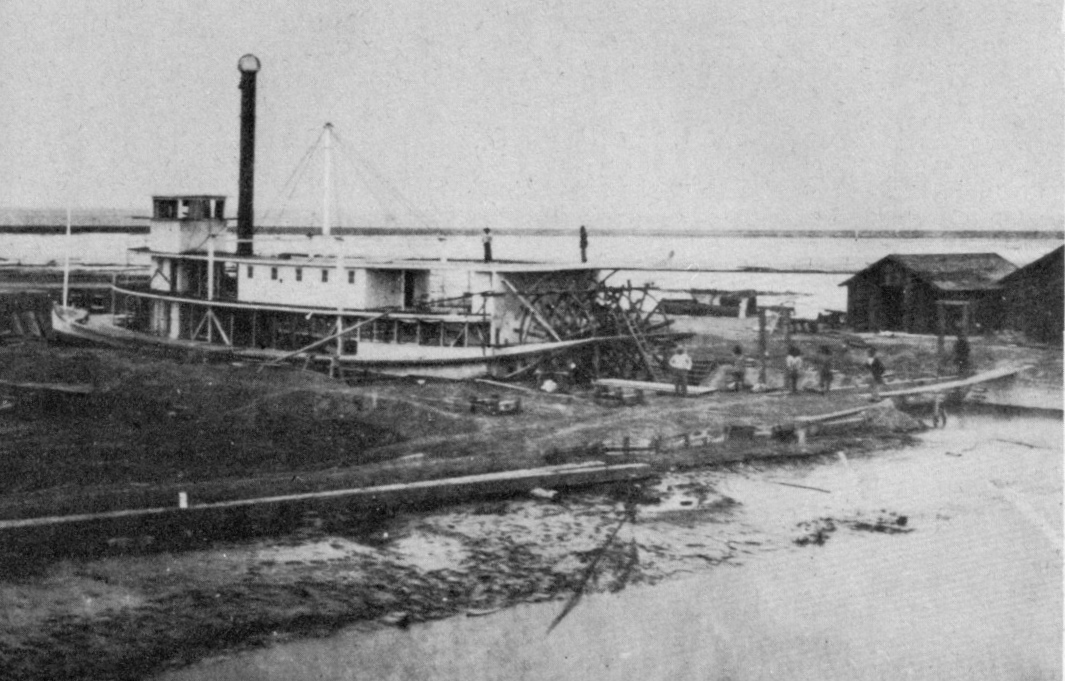
Sternwheel steamboat Colorado II, built 1862, in the tidal dry dock at the former settlement of Port Isabel, Sonora.

Colorado, second of its name on the Colorado River, was a stern-wheel paddle-steamer, rebuilt from the original Colorado was the fifth steamboat on the Colorado River. It was first put on the river in December 1862.

At the end of its service life the first Colorado's hull was dismantled in April, 1862. Its engine and boiler were removed and used to equip the new, larger stern-wheel Colorado that was built for the George A. Johnson & Company in San Francisco by John G. North a well known builder of steamboats in California. It was assembled and launched under the guns of Fort Yuma, in Arizona City, for fear of an attack by Confederate raiders. The new Colorado was equipped with the old Colorado's 80 horsepower steam engine, it was a 179-ton boat slightly larger than the older boat, 145 feet long and with a 29-foot beam.

Captained by Stephen Thorne, the Colorado II remained on the river until it was dismantled in 1882.
