= General Jesup (sidewheeler) =

Colorado River transport boat

History

United States
- Name: General Jesup
- Namesake: Thomas Jesup
- Operator: George A. Johnson & Company
- Launched: 1854

General characteristics
- Type: Side Wheeler
- Length: 104 feet (32 m)
- Beam: 27 feet (8.2 m)
- Draft: 30 inches (76 cm)
- Installed power: 50-horsepower
- Propulsion: steam engine
- Capacity: 50 tons

General Jesup was a side-wheel paddle-steamer, named for General Thomas Jesup then Quartermaster General of the United States Army, and was the second steamboat launched on the Colorado River, in 1854.

In late 1853, George Alonzo Johnson with his partner Hartshorne and a new partner Captain Alfred H. Wilcox, formed George A. Johnson & Company and obtained the contract from the U. S. Army to supply the remote post of Fort Yuma. Johnson and his partners all having learned a lesson from their previous failed attempts ascending the Colorado, and with the example of the earlier steamboat Uncle Sam, brought the parts of a more powerful side-wheel steamboat, the General Jesup, with them to the mouth of the Colorado from San Francisco. The General Jesup was 104 feet (32 m)long with a 17 foot (5.2 m) beam, 27 feet (8.2 m) with its paddle guards, and drew 30 inches (76 cm) of water. There it was reassembled and launched at a landing in the upper tidewater of the river and reached Fort Yuma, January 18, 1854. This new boat with a 50-horsepower steam engine, capable of carrying 50 tons of cargo unloaded in the estuary up river against the strong current of the Colorado River, was very successful making round trips from the estuary to the fort in only four or five days. Costs of transport of goods to the fort were cut from $500 per ton or more to only $75 per ton.

Another reason for the speed of the new steamboat beside its powerful engine was the establishment of the wood-yards along the river between the delta and Fort Yuma. The landings were organized by Johnson to supply wood for the steamboats, so the crew would not need to gather wood as they proceeded up river, as the crew of the Uncle Sam had been obliged to do. These landings were each located at about the distance a steamboat could travel up and down river each day on that section of river. Steamboats did not travel at night, due to the danger of running onto sandbars or into snags on the ever-changing river. The boats would be refueled at the landings while tied up overnight. The wood-yards were owned by Yankee's, who hired the Cocopah from local rancherias, to cut the wood (usually cottonwood or mesquite), transport it to the wood-yards and load it onto the boats. Cocopah men often also served as deck hands on the steamboats.

In 1857, George A. Johnson decided to conduct his own expedition up river at his own expense with the General Jesup. The War Department concerned about deteriorating relations with the Mormons in Utah wanted to investigate the possibility of bringing troops into Utah by steamboat up the Colorado River. Fort Yuma's commander provided rations, a mountain howitzer and a detachment of 15 soldiers. With the soldiers and 15 armed civilians Johnson set off from the fort on December 31. The large crew aided in gathering wood for fuel along the way, and 21 days later, Johnson's party had reached the first rapids in Pyramid Canyon, over 300 miles (480 km) above Fort Yuma and 8 miles (13 km) above the modern site of Davis Dam. Running low on food he turned back after viewing the river ahead continuing another 40 miles (64 km) and believed he had proved the river could be navigated as far as the Virgin River which he believed to be only 75 miles (121 km) away.

During the 1858-59 Mohave War the General Jesup and the larger and newer stern-wheeler Colorado where engaged to carry troops and supplies up river for the Mohave Expeditions at $500 per day, and thereafter contracted to support the army posts of Camp Gaston and Camp Mohave, later Fort Mohave.

After five years on the Colorado, the now worn out General Jesup was dismantled in 1859. It was replaced by the larger more powerful Cocopah, a stern-wheel steamboat drawing only 19 inches of water, which was better suited to navigating the hazards of the upper Colorado route.

== See also ==
- Steamboats of the Colorado River
