= Camp Gaston =

Former U.S. Army camp in California

Coordinates: 33.4332°N 114.7325°W

Camp Gaston, sometimes called Fort Gaston is a former U.S. Army camp, that was located 3 miles west of the old original course of the Colorado River south of modern Palo Verde, California, in Imperial County, California, near Milpitas Wash Road. It was 80 miles (130 km) up river from Fort Yuma, and was active between 1859 and 1867.

Camp Gaston on the Colorado River is not to be confused with the Fort Gaston, located in the Hoopa Valley Indian Reservation on the Trinity River in Northern California from 1859 to 1892. The northern Fort Gaston was for a short time officially designated as Camp Gaston from 1866 to early 1867 before being re-designated as Fort Gaston.

== History ==
Camp Gaston was first established in April 1859, as an advance base for two companies of the 6th Infantry, part of the 2nd Mohave Expedition during the Mohave War. Subsequently, it remained as an outpost of Fort Yuma, intermittently until 1867. It was located along the Colorado River in what is now the Palo Verde Valley, 80 miles by steamboat up the Colorado River from Fort Yuma and 45 miles by land, on the west bank of the river in California.
