= Gore Island (Baja California) =

Island in Baja California, Mexico

Coordinates: 31°44′43″N 114°37′44″W

Gore Island, or Isla Gore, is an island in the Colorado River Delta within the state of Baja California, Mexico. It lies between two dis-tributary channels east of the main channel of the Colorado River and Montague Island that flow southeastward into the Gulf of California, southeast of the mainland of Baja California Peninsula.
