= Pyramid Canyon =

Colorado River canyon where Davis Dam was built

- Location within Arizona

Geography
- Coordinates: 35°12′07″N 114°34′25″W
- Interactive map of Pyramid Canyon

Pyramid Canyon is the canyon on the Colorado River where Davis Dam was built on the state line between Nevada and Arizona. The canyon is located on the Colorado River, between Cottonwood Valley on the north and the Mohave Valley to the south. To the west of the canyon are the Newberry Mountains, and to the east are the Black Mountains of Arizona. Originally a deep canyon between the two ranges containing the free flowing Colorado River, Pyramid Canyon is now filled by the lower reach of Lake Mohave a reservoir formed by Davis Dam.
