= Port Isabel, Sonora =

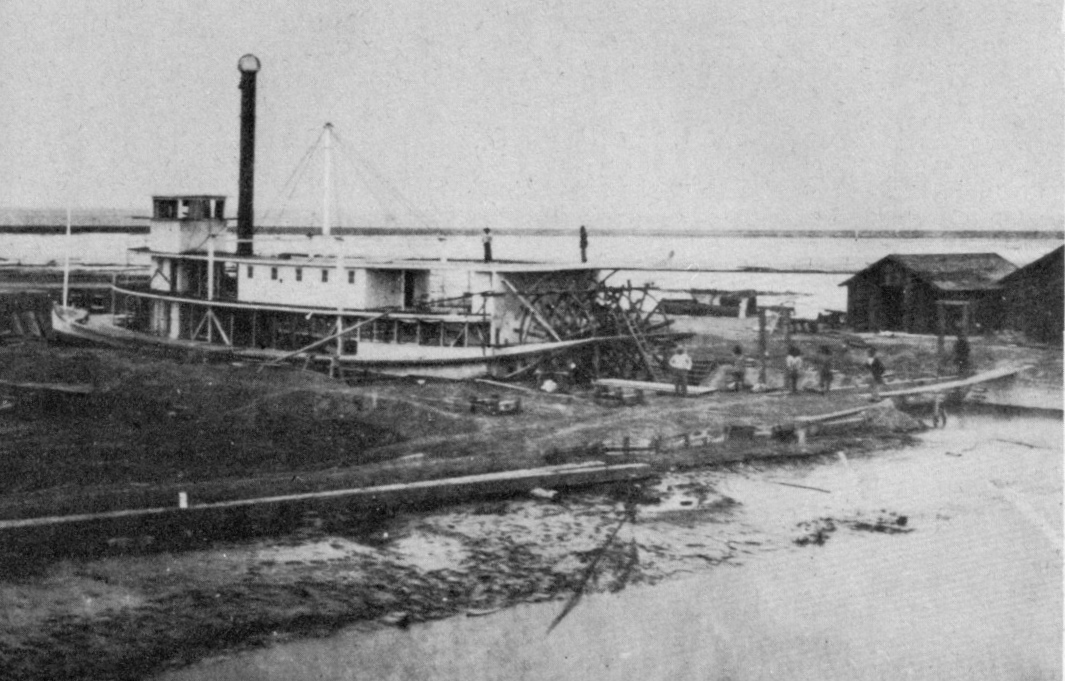
Sternwheel steamboat Colorado No. 2, built 1862, in the tidal dry dock at the former settlement of Port Isabel.

Port Isabel was a seaport established on Port Isabel Slough in 1865 during the American Civil War in Sonora, Mexico in the mouth of the Colorado River on the Gulf of California. It was founded to support the increased river traffic caused by the gold rush that began in 1862 on the Colorado River and the Yuma Quartermaster Depot newly established in 1864 to support the Army posts in the Arizona Military District. The slough was discovered in 1865 by the Captain W. H. Pierson of the schooner Isabel, that first used the slough to transfer its cargo to steamboats safe from the tidal bore of the Colorado River. Shortly afterward Port Isabel was established 3 miles up the slough and replaced Robinson's Landing as the place where cargo was unloaded in the river from seagoing craft on to flat bottomed steamboats of the Colorado River and carried up to Fort Yuma and points further north on the river.

By 1867, Port Isabel, was situated on Port Isabel Slough whose mouth lay to the east of the main channel of the Colorado River on its channel east of Montague Island about 2 1/2 miles from its entrance, at the first good landing place, the shores below being of very soft mud. Port Isabel, served as a location for repairing the river steamers and barges at a location about 2 miles above Port Isabel on what was called Shipyard Slough that became the site called Ship Yard, which had a few frame buildings, a dry dock and a ship way where steamboats could be constructed or repaired.

The arrival of the Southern Pacific Railroad in Yuma in 1877 signaled the end of Port Isabel. Trade by sea was replaced with cargo carried by rail. In 1877, George Alonzo Johnson sold his Colorado Steam Navigation Company to the Southern Pacific Railroad. Yuma then became the head of navigation for steamboats operating on the river. Port Isabel was abandoned by 1879, its shipyard being moved to Yuma, Arizona.
