= Invincible (schooner) =

Invincible was a 120-ton topsail schooner, used as a transport for the U. S. Army Department of the Pacific in California from 1849 to 1851.

It was noted in Army reports of Bvt. Major H. D. Rucker, as carrying 13,000 rations to be used to feed starving settlers on the trails to California. It sailed from Benicia to Sacramento between September 9–11, 1849, carrying the major who was in charge of organizing the relief parties.

On November 1, 1850, the Invincible was later sent from San Francisco on a mission to deliver 10,000 rations to the garrison of the remote post of Fort Yuma on the Colorado River. Captain Alfred H. Wilcox was in command of the 12-man crew, and Lieutenant George Derby was in command of the mission to see if the rations could be delivered by the schooner up the Colorado River from the Gulf of California. Fort Yuma was being supplied by land from San Diego, across the coastal mountains and the Colorado Desert. This route proved to be difficult and expensive, leading to a food shortage.

The schooner arrived in San Diego to pick up the rations, then proceeded to the mouth of the Colorado River, stopping only at Cabo San Lucas and Guaymas. The Invincible arrived at the river mouth on December 25. Captain Wilcox then ascended the river but with difficulty. The Invincible, drawing eight feet of water, was grounded at every ebb tide, which was extreme in the Colorado River Delta. On January 3, 1850, some 30 miles upriver, Captain Wilcox was forced to drop anchor, his way blocked by shoals too shallow to pass. Local Cocopah people there that day agreed to carry a message to Fort Yuma of the arrival of the ship.

After waiting until 11 January without receiving an answer, Derby, who due to an old British chart of the river mouth, believed the fort to be nearby instead of 120 miles away, attempted to continue up the river to reach the fort with the ship's longboat. Two days later, he met the fort commander, Major Samuel P. Heintzelman, coming down the river in a boat. Arraignments were made to unload the boats at the ship's anchorage on the shore of Sonora and loaded onto wagons from the fort on 28 January.
