= Montague Island (Baja California) =

Island in Baja California, Mexico

Coordinates: 31°44′18″N 114°44′47″W

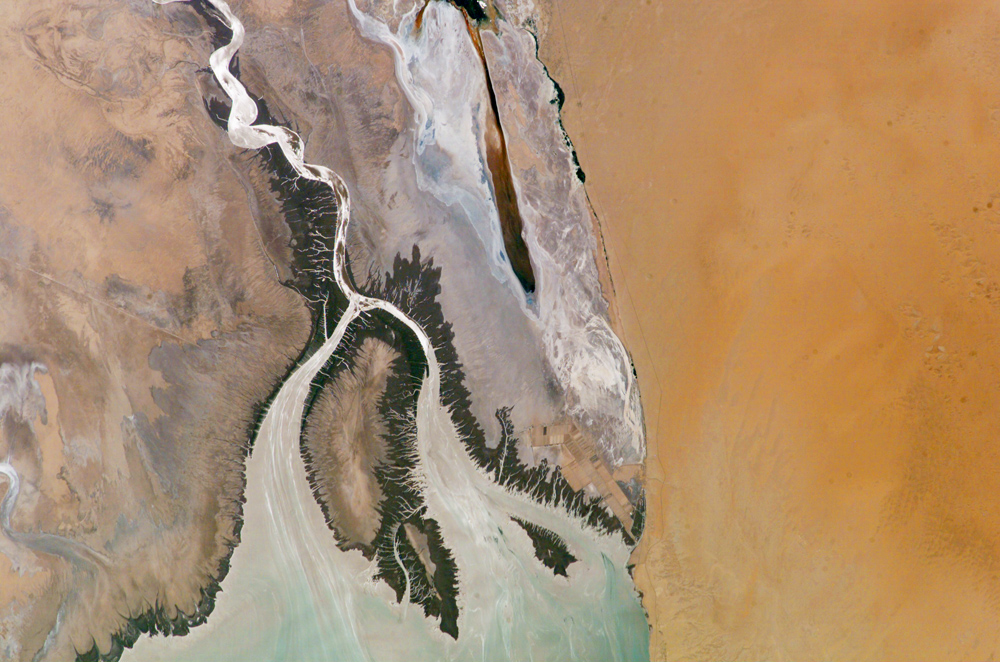
Colorado River Delta as seen from space (2004); Montague Island is the large island in the center.

Montague Island, known in Spanish as Isla Montague, is an island at the mouth of the Colorado River in the municipality of Mexicali, Baja California, Mexico, and is part of the Colorado River Delta and part of a broader region called the Salton Trough. It is about 32 km (20 mi) in length along its longest axis.

The Colorado River Delta region experiences some of the highest tidal ranges in the world, up to 10 metres (33 ft), and at the highest tides, Montague Island is completely inundated. Although the islands in the delta have changed much over time, a map of the region shows Montague Island in 1873. The island is uninhabited, as the climate is very hot, arid and the area occasionally floods. The nearest inhabited town is Golfo de Santa Clara in the state of Sonora.

== Ecology ==
The climate in the region of the Island is extremely hot and arid, with average annual rainfall of 2.4 in (60 mm). Montague Island, as part of the Colorado river delta, has had its ecology radically altered by diversion and use of water upstream in the river. The only water reaching the delta, with the exception of occasional floods, is agricultural wastewater.

At least seven species of water birds are known to breed on Montague Island. The island is one of two known active breeding colonies of elegant tern in Mexico. During two years, a large number of nests were destroyed by tidal flooding, but there were only low levels of nests lost to predation. The birds nesting on Montague Island have reacted strongly to El Niño, with brown boobies being replaced by blue-footed boobies, and an increase in nesting of least, elegant, and royal terns, as well as black skimmers.

Montague Island is one of the few locations where Mulinia coloradoensis, an endangered species of clam, is found. This species was once extremely abundant near the mouth of the Colorado river, but now only exists in a few isolated places. The decline of this clam is explained by the increase in salinity of the water due to diversion of and use of water from the Colorado River.

== Energy resources ==
In 1981, Pemex discovered natural gas near the island, prompting a scramble for oil and gas leases in the nearby U.S. city of Yuma, Arizona. The area has also been studied for the potential use of tidal power.
