= Uncle Sam (1852 sidewheeler) =

Side-wheel paddle-steamer

History
- Name: Uncle Sam
- Builder: Domingo Marcucci, San Francisco
- Completed: June 1852
- Fate: Sank 1853 at Fort Yuma

General characteristics
- Type: Paddle steamer
- Length: 65 ft (20 m)
- Installed power: 20 hp (15 kW) engine
- Capacity: 35 tons

Uncle Sam, was a side-wheel paddle steamer and the first steamboat on the Colorado River in 1852.

In November 1852, Uncle Sam, a 65-foot (20 m) long side-wheel paddle steamer was brought by the schooner Capacity from San Francisco to the Colorado River Delta by the next contractor to supply Fort Yuma, Captain James Turnbull. It had been built in June 1852 in San Francisco by Domingo Marcucci and disassembled for shipment. It was assembled and launched in the estuary, 30 miles (48 km) above the mouth of the Colorado River. Equipped with only a 20-horsepower (15 kW) engine, Uncle Sam could only carry 35 tons of supplies, taking 15 days to make the first 120-mile (190 km) trip.

Uncle Sam made many trips up and down the river for four months to finish carrying all the supplies for the fort, improving its time up river to 12 days. Negligence caused it to sink at its dock below Fort Yuma, and was then washed away and lost before it could be raised, in the spring flood of 1853. Turnbull who meanwhile had returned to the Delta from San Francisco with another cargo and a more powerful engine for the Uncle Sam. He returned to San Francisco, for a new hull, while the army sent wagons to recover the cargo from the delta again. However, Turnbull in financial difficulty, disappeared from the city leaving creditors unpaid. Nevertheless, Turnbull had shown the worth of steamboats to solve Fort Yuma's supply problem.
