= George Alonzo Johnson =

American businessman and politician (1824–1903)

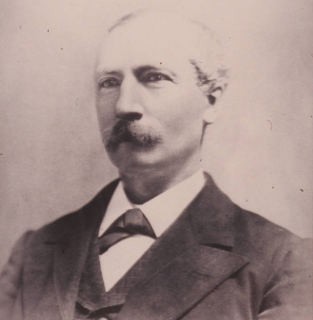
- Johnson, ca. 1865
- Born: August 16, 1824; Palatine Bridge, New York, U.S.
- Died: November 27, 1903 (aged 79); San Diego, California, U.S.
- Resting place: Pioneer Park (San Diego); 32.7492°N 117.1776°W
- Occupations: Entrepreneur, Politician
- Years active: 1849–1903
- Known for: Steamboat navigation on the Colorado River, California State Assembly
- Political party: Democratic
- Spouse: Maria Estéfana Alvarado (m. 1859)
- Children: Nine, two survived to adulthood

Member of the California State Assembly
- In office 1863–1863
- Constituency: 1st District

Member of the California State Assembly
- In office 1866–1867

George Alonzo Johnson (August 16. 1824 – November 27, 1903) was an American entrepreneur and politician.

== Biography ==
=== Early life ===
Johnson was born in Palatine Bridge, New York, to Gertrydt van Slyk (1794–1826) and George Granville Johnson (1794–1871). His mother was from Palatine, New York, and of Dutch descent while his father was from Fairfield, Connecticut, and of English descent. Johnson was taught sailing and metal casting by his father, who had worked in both industries.

=== Ferry business ===
In early 1849 as a sailor he heard of the discovery of gold and left New York drawn by the California gold rush and came to San Francisco in June 1849, working as a dock worker unloading ships, while regularly prospecting for precious ores in the local mines. In May 1850, having heard the news of the Glanton Massacre, he got together a small group of partners (including Benjamin M. Hartshorne). He traveled to Yuma Crossing via San Diego to start a ferry. They eventually sold it before returning to San Francisco.

In 1852, seeing the opportunity to bring supplies to the isolated post of Fort Yuma, Johnson and Hartshorne became business partners and contracted to carry supplies up Colorado River in poled barges. This failed due to the strong current and many sandbars in the river. After a steam tug, the 20 hp Uncle Sam, was successfully used to ascend the river in 1853, Johnson formed George A. Johnson & Company with Hartshorne and another partner Captain Alfred H. Wilcox. They brought the disassembled side-wheel steamboat General Jesup to the Colorado River Delta. There in the estuary, he assembled this more powerful 70 hp steamboat and began successfully shipping cargo and carrying passengers on the Colorado River from its mouth, up to Fort Yuma. His steamboat carried 50 tons of cargo to the fort in 5 days and brought the cost to supply the fort down to $75 a ton from the $500 a ton shipped across the desert from San Diego. It made the Company $4,000 per trip to ships in the mouth of the Colorado River.

Johnson was instrumental in getting Congressional funding for a military expedition to explore the Colorado River above Fort Yuma in 1856. Cut out of providing the steamboat for the 1857 expedition of Joseph Christmas Ives, Johnson at his own expense took the General Jesup up river first exploring the river up to Washoe territory, in what is now Nevada. As the only steamboat company on the river, Johnson and his partners became wealthy after discovering gold along the Colorado River in 1858.

In 1863, Johnson became a Member of the California State Assembly for the 1st District, and again in 1866–67. Johnson had delegated operations to his senior steamboat captain Issac Polhamus, and distracted by his rancho and political career, did not invest in more shipping to keep up with the growing traffic caused by the 1862 Colorado River gold rush.

By 1864 it had created a large backlog of undelivered freight and caused competition of opposition lines to arrive on the Colorado River. This finally forced Johnson to expand his fleet of steamboats and to begin to use barges to increase their cargo-carrying capacity. Following a price war that lasted until 1866, with the advantage of the contracts to supply the U. S. Army posts and his system of wood yards, Johnson's company was again the only steamboat company on the river. In 1869 he incorporated his steamboat company as the Colorado Steam Navigation Company which he and his partners held until they sold its steamboats to the Southern Pacific Railroad in 1877.

=== Personal life ===
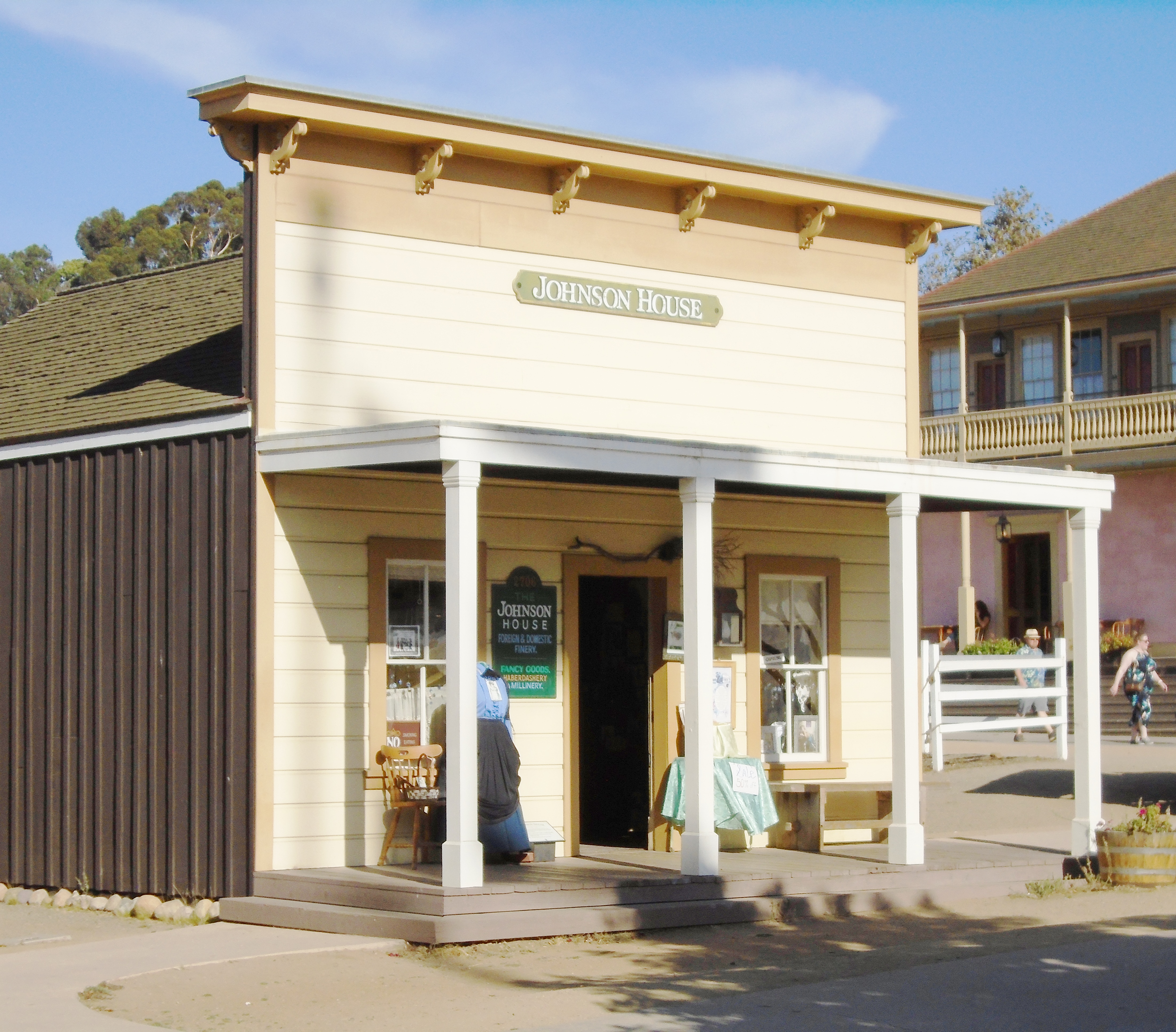
The Johnson House or Johnson Building in the Old Town San Diego State Historic Park, is a reconstruction of a mid-19th century office building which was later the house of George Alonzo Johnson. It was a pre-fabricated building which was brought to S

In 1858, Johnson moved to San Diego, where he married Maria Estéfana Alvarado (1840–1926), daughter of Francisco María Alvarado, on June 4, 1859, gaining ownership of Rancho Santa Maria de Los Peñasquitos as a wedding present. Johnson also built a home in Yuma for his wife for when they traveled there, that became the commanding officer quarters of the Yuma Quartermaster Depot in 1864. The Johnsons had nine children, but only two, George Alonzo Johnson and Tomasita Johnson, lived to adulthood.

Johnson acquired title to the Rancho Los Peñasquitos when the U.S. government granted a patent to the land in 1876. In 1880, the Johnsons lost their rancho to creditors and within several years moved to a building, now known as the Johnson House, which they owned on the plaza of San Diego where they remained until his death.

=== Death ===
He died on November 27, 1903, at the age of 79, and was buried in San Diego.
