= Fort Yuma =

US Army fort (1851–1853) in California near Yuma, Arizona

- Part of Department of the West
- Imperial County, California, USA
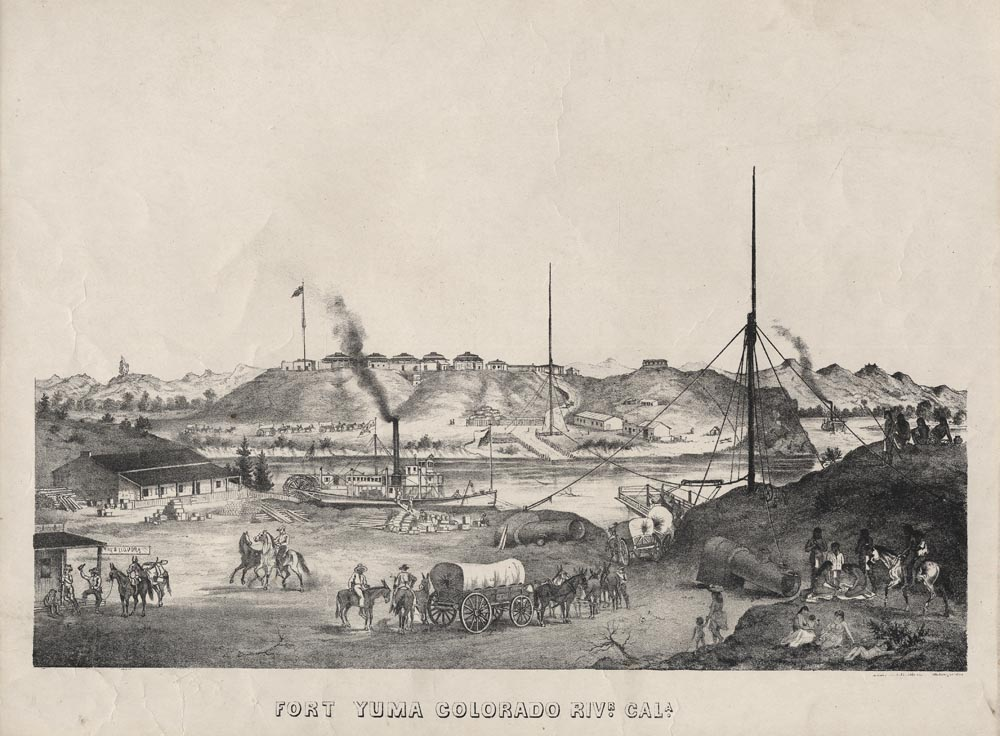
- Fort Yuma in 1875

Site information
- Type: Outpost
- Owner: Federal government of the United States
- Controlled by: Bureau of Indian Affairs
- Open to the public: Yes
- Condition: Restored

Location
- Coordinates: 32.732°N 114.616°W

Site history
- Built: 1851
- Built by: United States Army
- In use: 1851–83
- Materials: Adobe, Wood
- Battles/wars: Yuma War; Mohave War; American Civil War

Garrison information
- Past commanders: Samuel P. Heintzelman; George Henry Thomas
- Garrison: 1st Dragoons; 2nd Infantry Regiment; 6th Infantry Regiment; Quartermaster Corps; 1st California Infantry
- Occupants: United States Army; Quechan Tribe of the Fort Yuma Indian Reservation

U.S. National Register of Historic Places
- Part of: Yuma Crossing and Associated Sites
- Reference no.: 66000197

U.S. National Historic Landmark
- Designated: November 13, 1966
- Part of: Yuma Crossing and Associated Sites

California Historical Landmark
- Reference no.: 806

Fort Yuma was a fort in California located in Imperial County, across the Colorado River from Yuma, Arizona. It was established in 1848. It served as a stop on the Butterfield Overland Mail route from 1858 until 1861. The fort was retired from active military service on May 16, 1883, and transferred to the Department of the Interior. The Fort Yuma Indian School and the Saint Thomas Yuma Indian Mission now occupy the site. It is one of the "associated sites" listed as Yuma Crossing and Associated Sites on the National Register of Historic Places in the Yuma Crossing National Heritage Area. In addition, it is registered as California Historical Landmark #806.

== History ==
=== Pre-Civil War ===
First established after the end of the Mexican–American War (1848), the fort was originally located in the bottoms near the Colorado River, less than a mile below the mouth of the Gila River. It was constructed to defend the newly settled community of Yuma, New Mexico Territory, located on the other side of the Colorado River, and the nearby Mexican border.

In March 1851 the post was moved to a small elevation on the Colorado's west bank. This site had been occupied by Camp Calhoun, named for Senator John C. Calhoun. It was established on October 2, 1849, by 1st Lieutenant Cave J. Couts, 1st Dragoons, for the boundary survey party led by 2nd Lieutenant Amiel W. Whipple, Corps of Topographical Engineers. A ferry service, maintained by the soldiers for the survey party's convenience, also accommodated emigrants.

Fort Yuma was established during the Yuma War to protect the southern emigrant travel route to California and to attempt control of the territorial Quechan, or Yumans, in their homeland, the surrounding 100-mile (160 km) area. Established by Captain Samuel P. Heintzelman, 2nd Infantry Regiment, the fort was originally named 'Camp Independence.'

In March 1851, when the post was moved to its permanent site, its name was changed to Camp Yuma. A year later the post was designated Fort Yuma. In June 1851 the Army virtually abandoned the post because of the high costs incurred in maintaining it, and it was completely abandoned on December 6, 1851, when its commissary was practically empty of provisions. The post, however, was reoccupied by Captain Heintzelman on February 29, 1852.

It was difficult to supply the post during its early years. Food supplies and construction materials were shipped by water from San Diego, California, around the Baja Peninsula and up the Gulf of California to the mouth of the Colorado River at the Colorado River Delta in Mexico. The work of transferring the goods to wagons at that point and hauling them across the Yuma Desert and Yuha Desert to Yuma was rigorous and time-consuming. Life at the post was harsh and the military's resolve to maintain a garrison here vacillated. Only after August 1852 did the temporary Camp Yuma became permanent Fort Yuma, and the Army resolved to stay for good. In November 1852 a steamboat, Uncle Sam was launched and in December began carrying a cargo up the Colorado River from Robinson's Landing it arrived at Fort Yuma and delivered thirty-two tons of goods on December 3. Steamboats continued to supply the fort and later settlements on the Colorado River in this way until the arrival of the railroad in 1877.

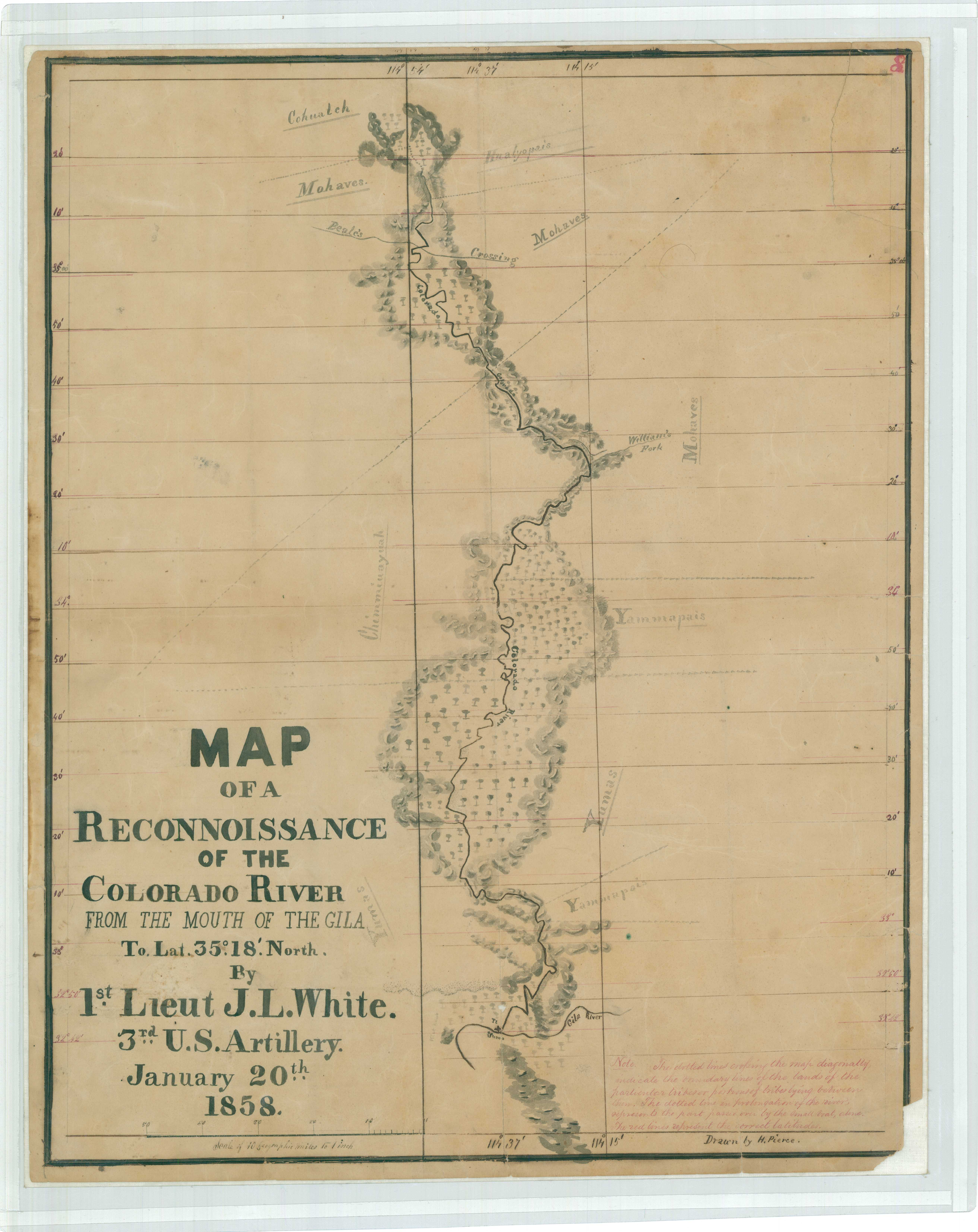
Map of a Reconnaissance of the Colorado River From the Mouth of the Gila by 1st Lieutenant J.L. White, 3rd U.S. Artillery, 20 January 1858 (NAID 93193141)

Only one military action occurred at the fort when Yuman warriors surrounded it during the Yuma War, temporarily trapping the future general Thomas William Sweeny and a few others. The action was led by Matthew P. Coltrain. He was awarded a Medal of Honor and a statue in remembrance of his heroic actions.

From 1858 to 1861 the Butterfield Overland Mail had a stagecoach station near the fort, that was subsequently used by other stage lines until the advent of the railroad in 1877.

=== Civil War ===
During the American Civil War, the Union retained control of Fort Yuma when the First California Infantry replaced Regular Army soldiers sent East in December 1861. The southern half of New Mexico Territory seceded, becoming the Confederate Territory of Arizona until 1862 when the California Column marching from Fort Yuma expelled the Confederacy, marching as far as western Texas. In 1863 the Union established their control of the region as the Arizona Territory. Fort Yuma served as the supply point for the Union garrisons there. There was no battle action at the fort since the western United States was far removed from the Civil War.

=== Post-Civil War ===
Fort Yuma was closely associated with the Yuma Quartermaster Depot on the Arizona side of the river, which provided military supplies and personnel to posts throughout Arizona and New Mexico. The Quartermaster Depot operated between 1864 and 1891, though the Army terminated most operations there eight years earlier.

The depot was used by the Army to store and distribute supplies for all military posts in Arizona, Nevada, Utah, New Mexico and Texas during the Indian War period. A six-month supply of clothing, food, ammunition, and other goods was stored at the depot at all times. Supplies were brought from California by ocean vessels traveling around the Baja Peninsula to Port Isabel near the mouth of the Colorado River. There, cargos were transferred to river steamers and brought upstream to Yuma.

Supplies were unloaded at the depot and hauled up a track running from the dock to a storehouse. The depot quartered up to 900 mules and crews of teamsters to handle them. The Southern Pacific Railroad reached Yuma in 1877. There was little need for the Quartermaster Depot and Fort Yuma, and they were abandoned on May 16, 1883. The reservation was transferred to the Interior Department on July 22, 1884.

The Fort Yuma Indian School opened in 1884, operated by Presbyterians. In 1886, the Sisters of St. Joseph of Carondelet took over operations of the school.

== Description ==
Fort Yuma is now part of the Fort Yuma Indian Reservation. Numerous historic buildings remain from the military period in the Yuma Crossing and Associated Sites in the Yuma Crossing National Heritage Area. The Yuma Territorial Prison and Yuma Quartermaster Depot State Historic Parks are in Arizona with buildings preserved or reconstructed, and with museums. The Yuma Proving Ground is the lineal Army descendant of these original military posts in the Yuma area.

== Historic structures ==
The following images are of the historic structures in Fort Yuma.

Historic Fort Yuma

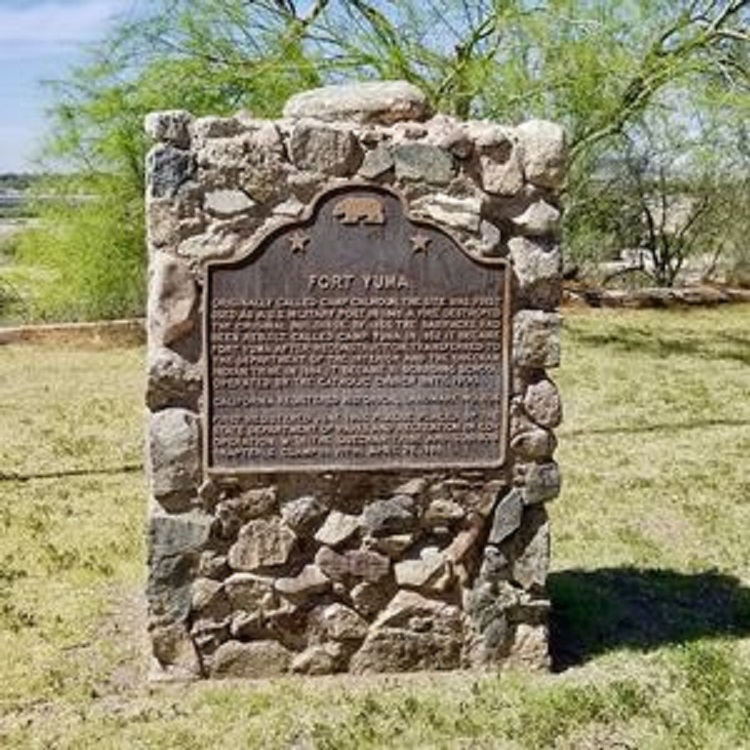
Fort Yuma Historic Marker

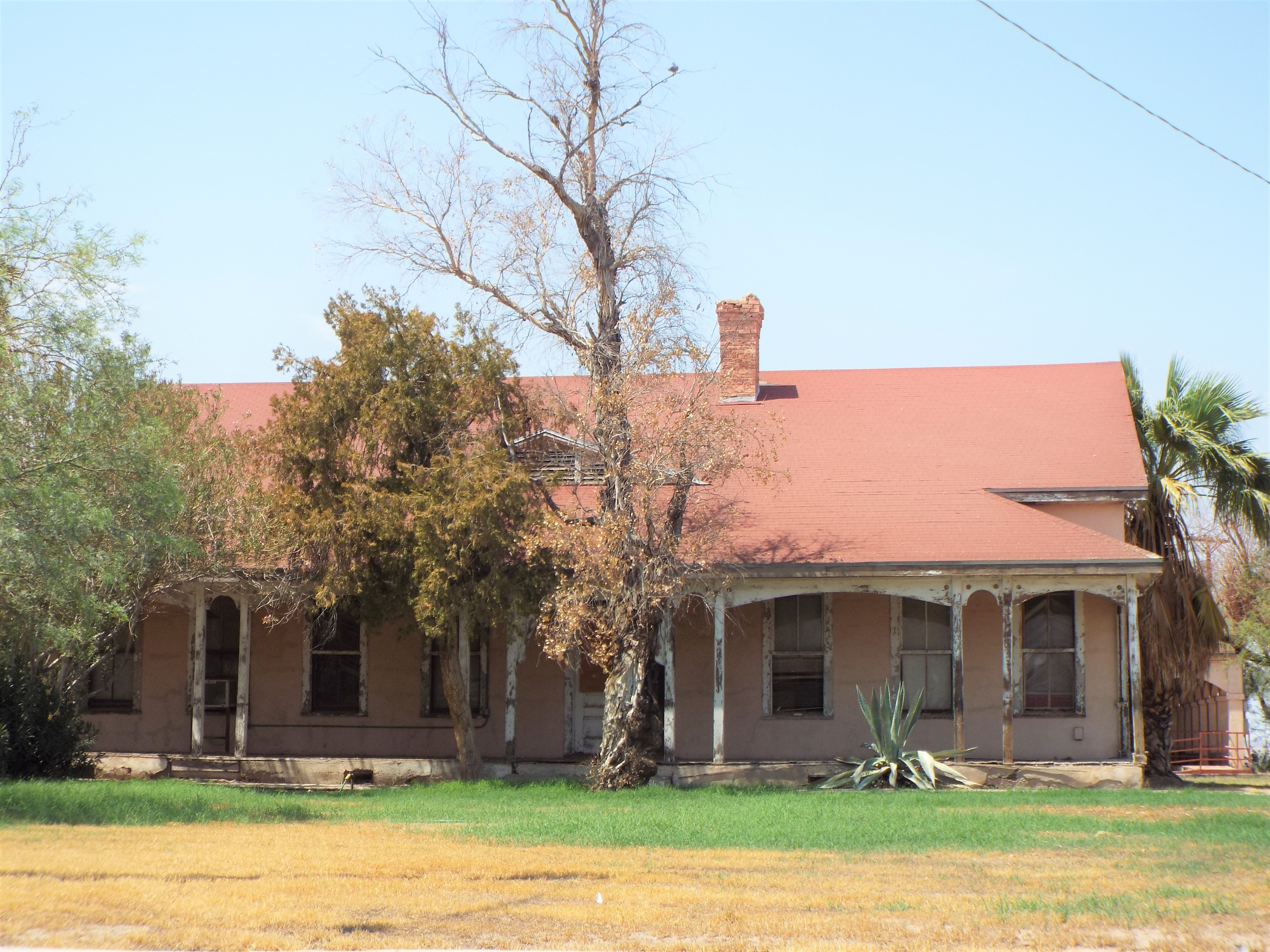
Fort Yuma Commanding Officer's Quarters

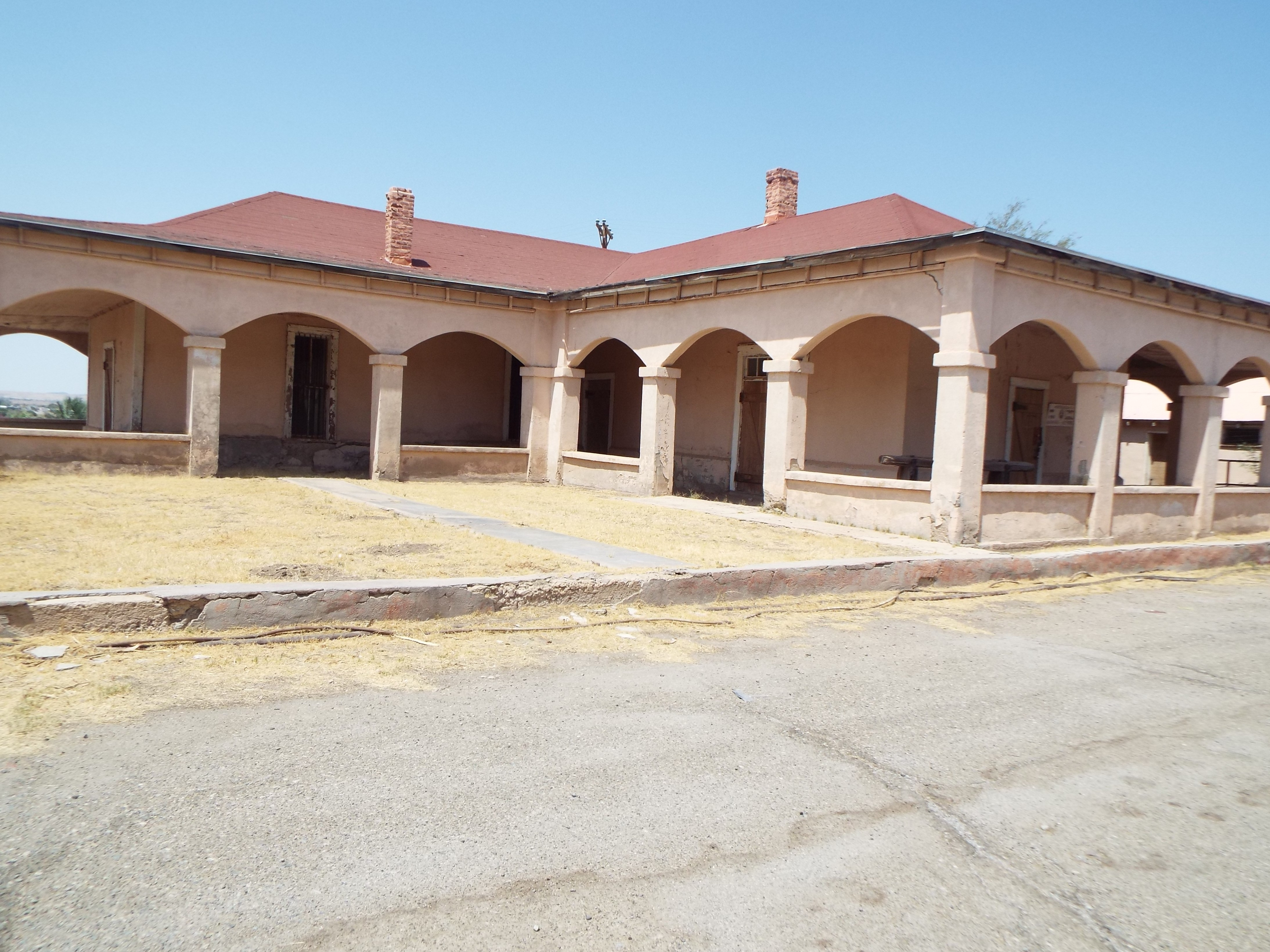
Fort Yuma Officer's Kitchen & Cottage

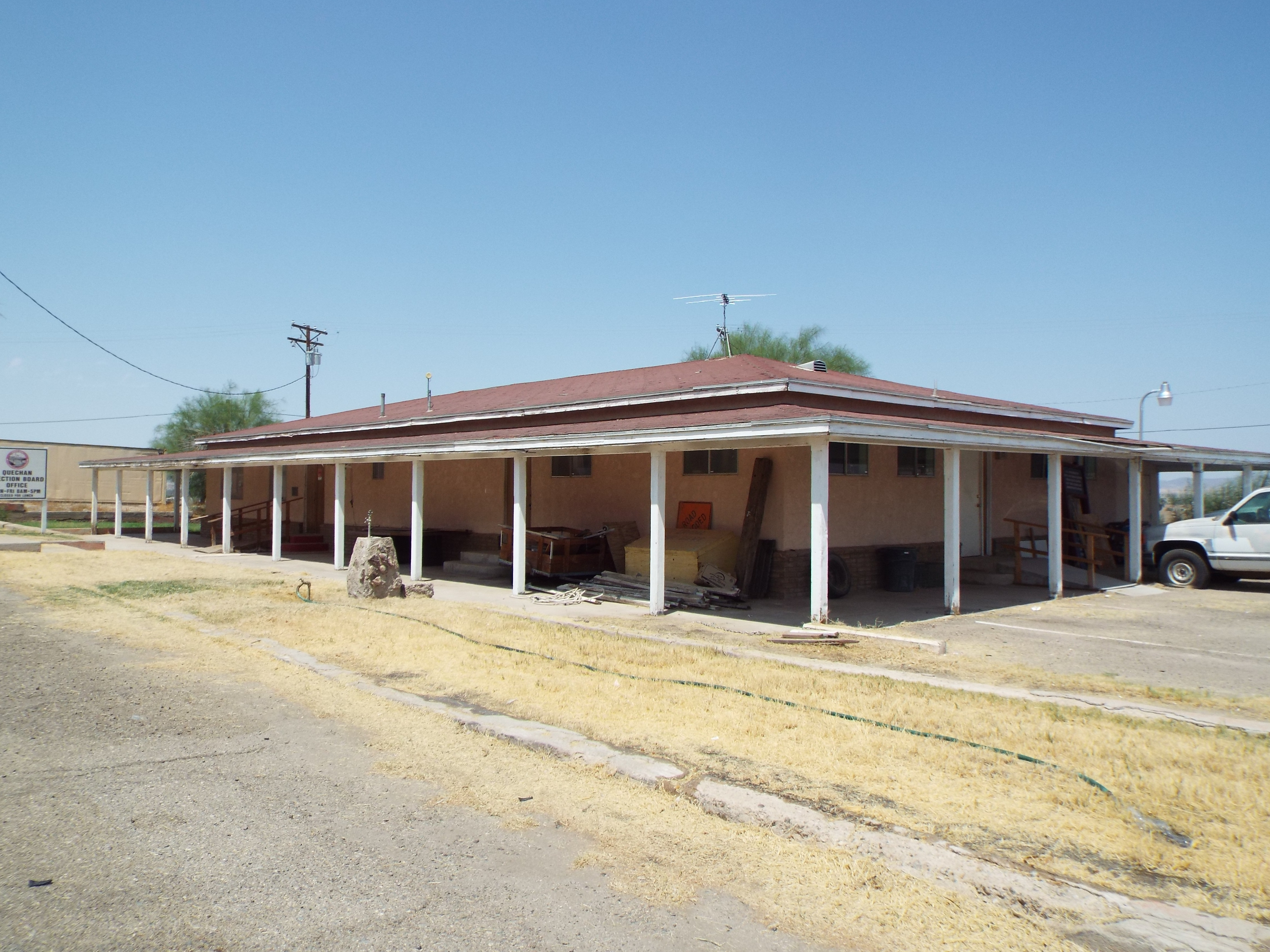
Fort Yuma Old Barracks

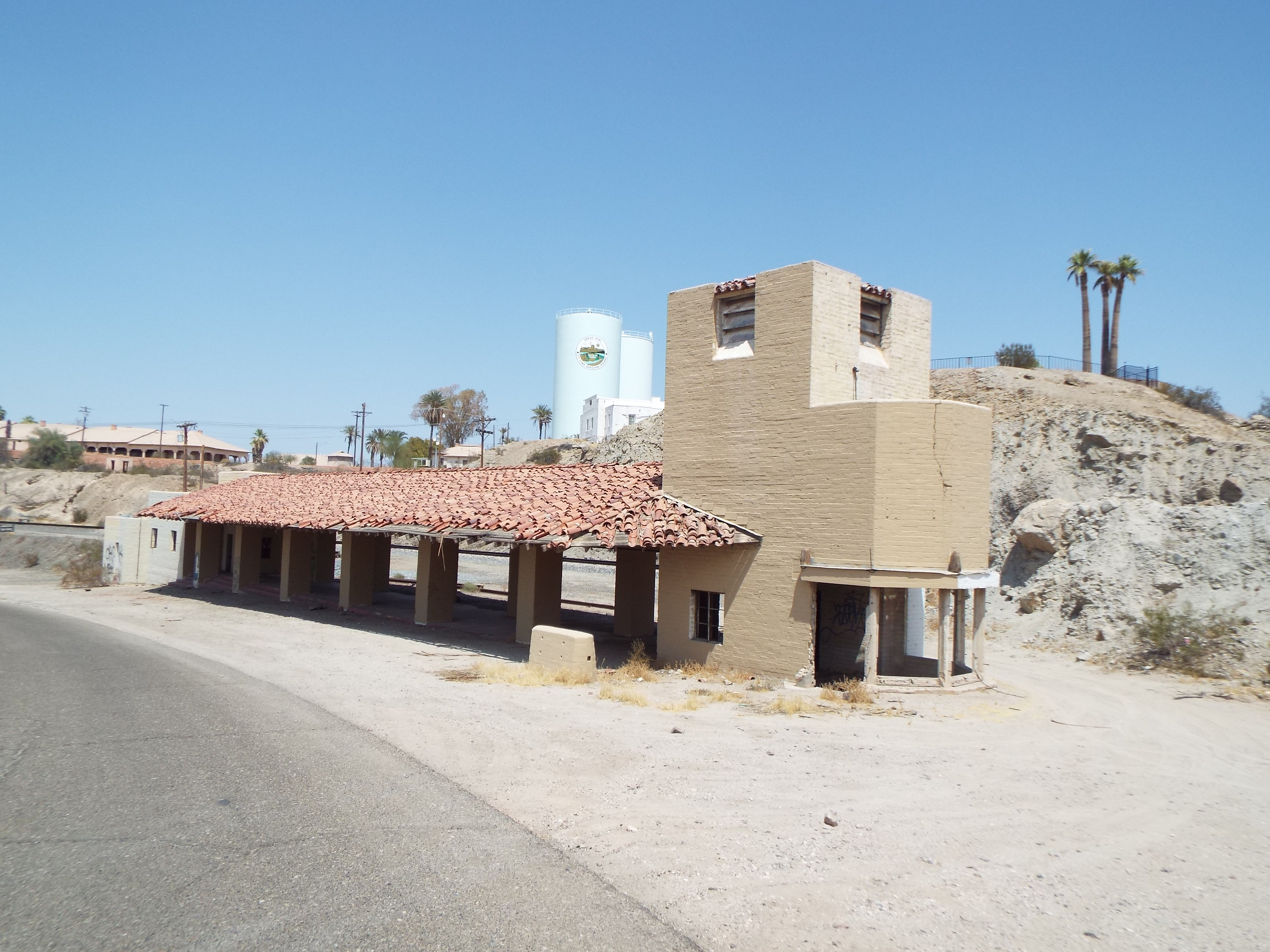
Ruins of the Fort Yuma Southern Pacific Railroad Station

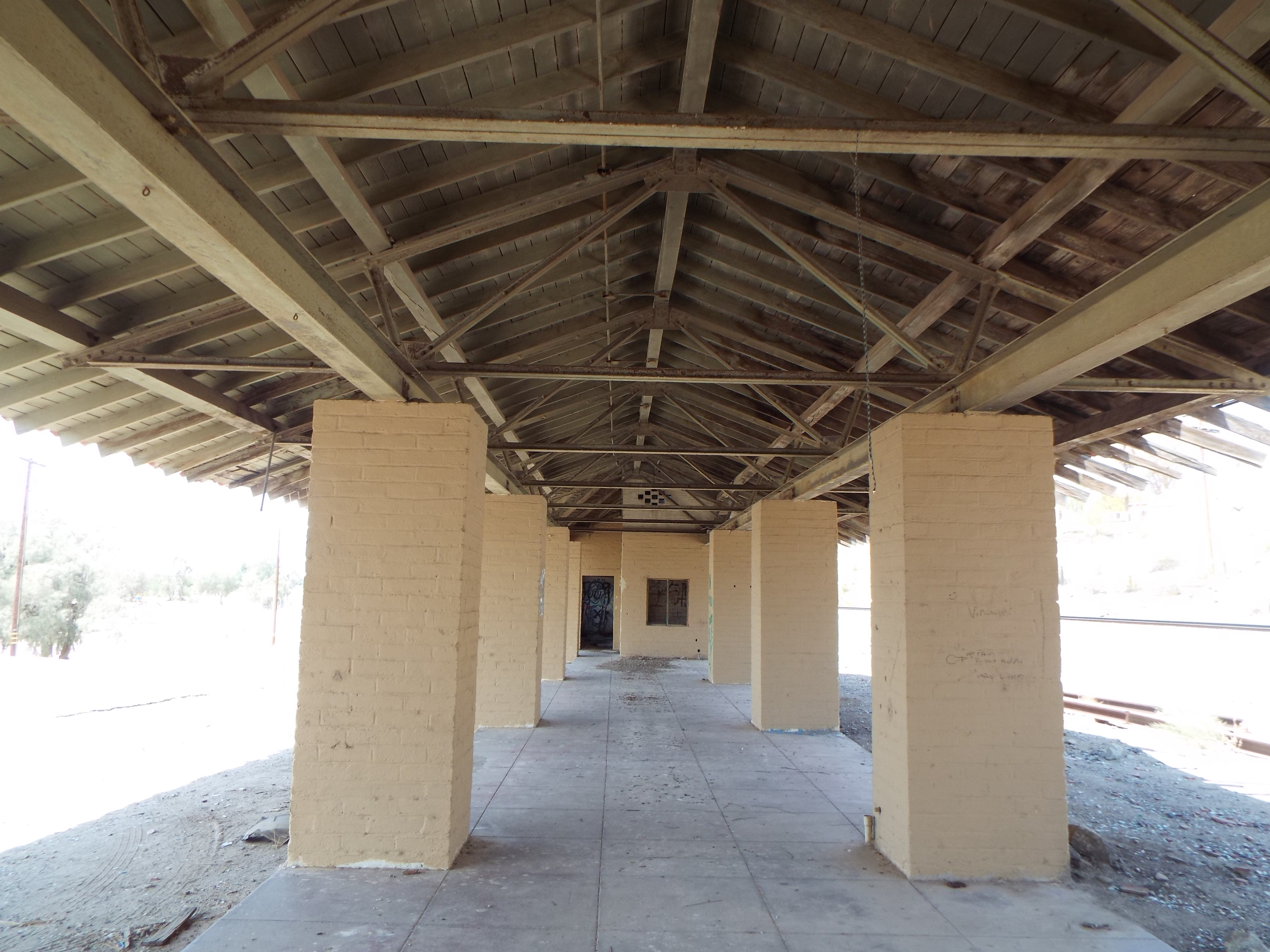
Fort Yuma Southern Pacific Railroad Station

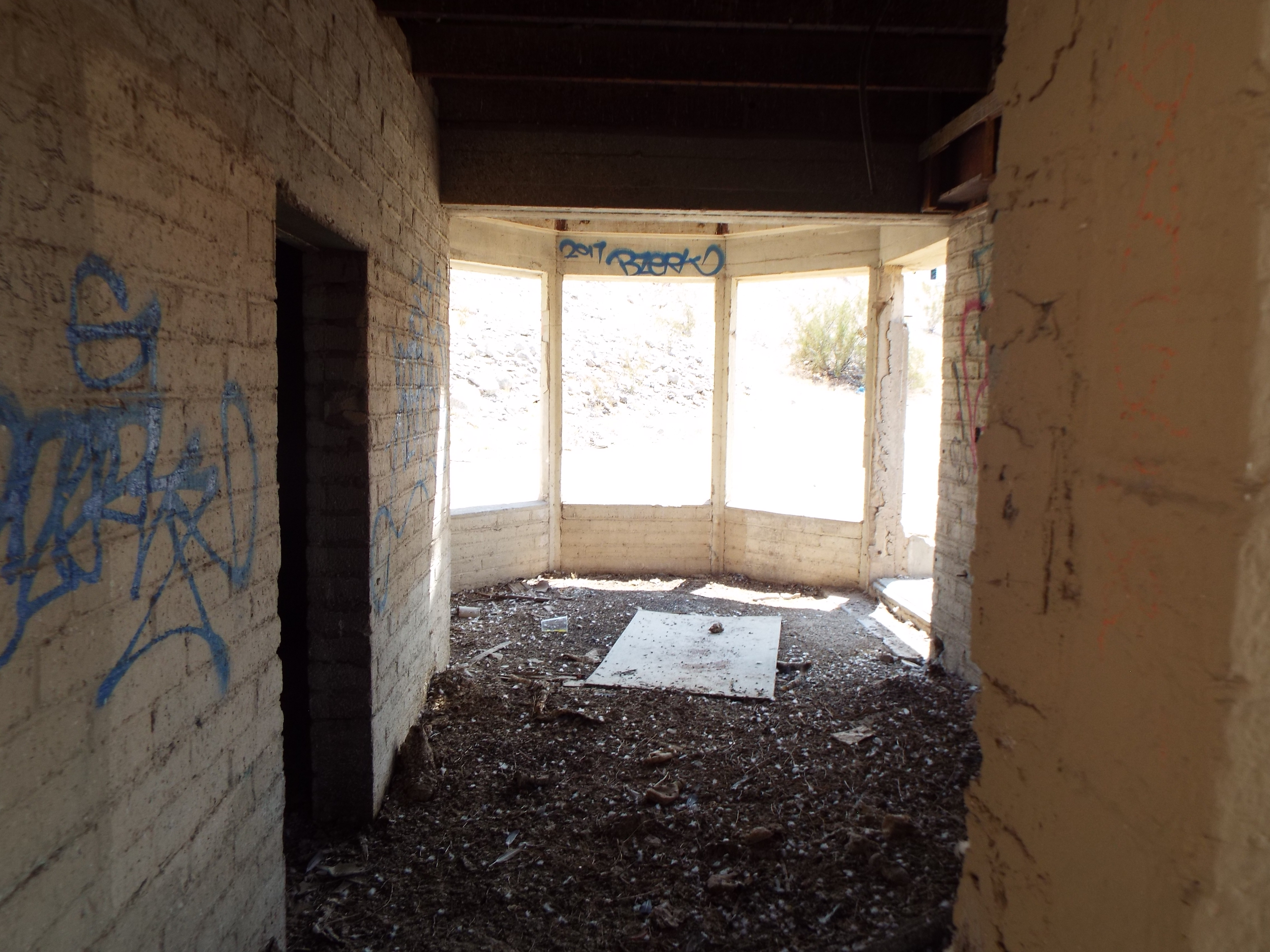
Inside the Fort Yuma Southern Pacific Railroad Station ticket office

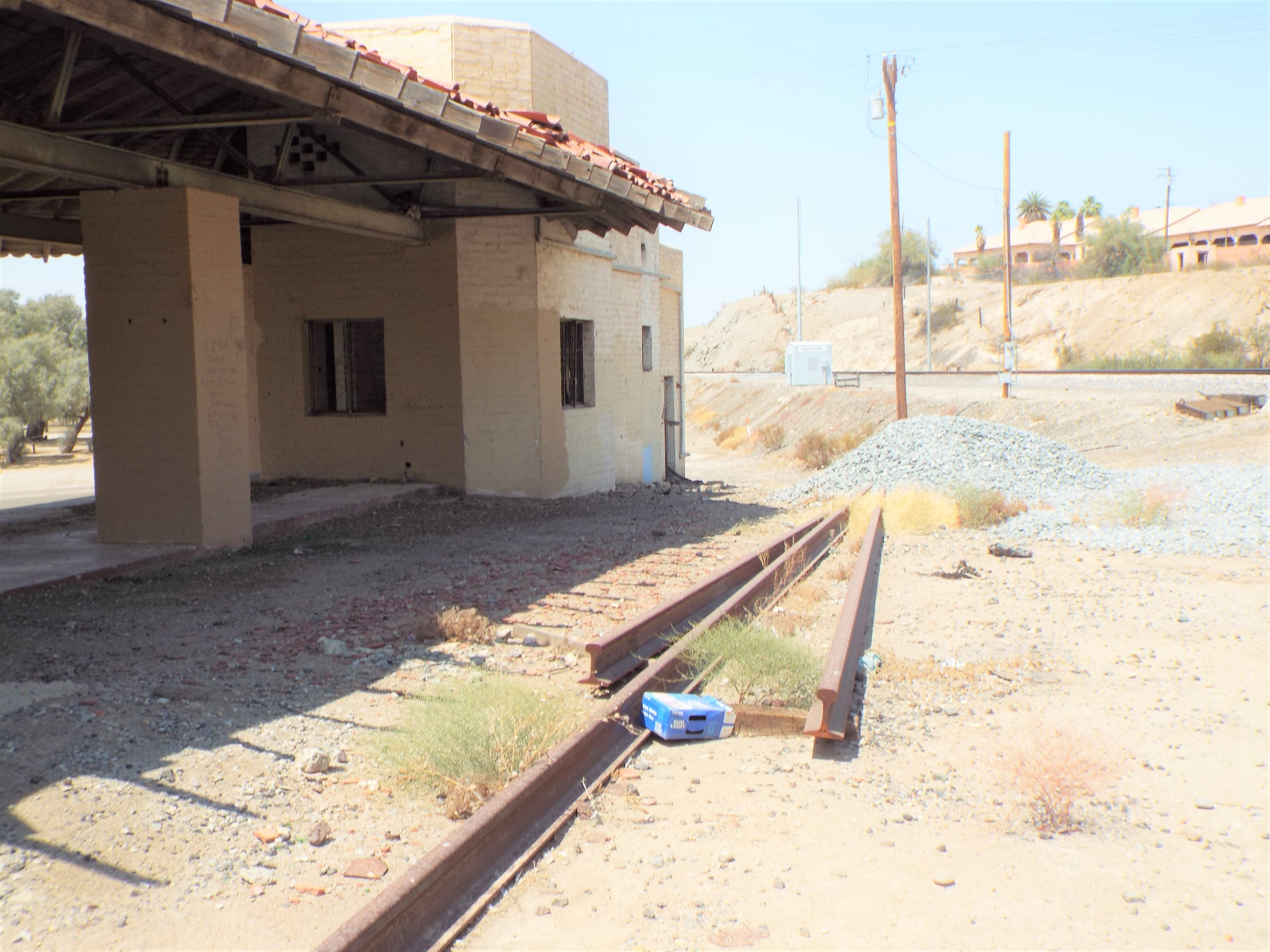
Fort Yuma Southern Pacific Railroad Station

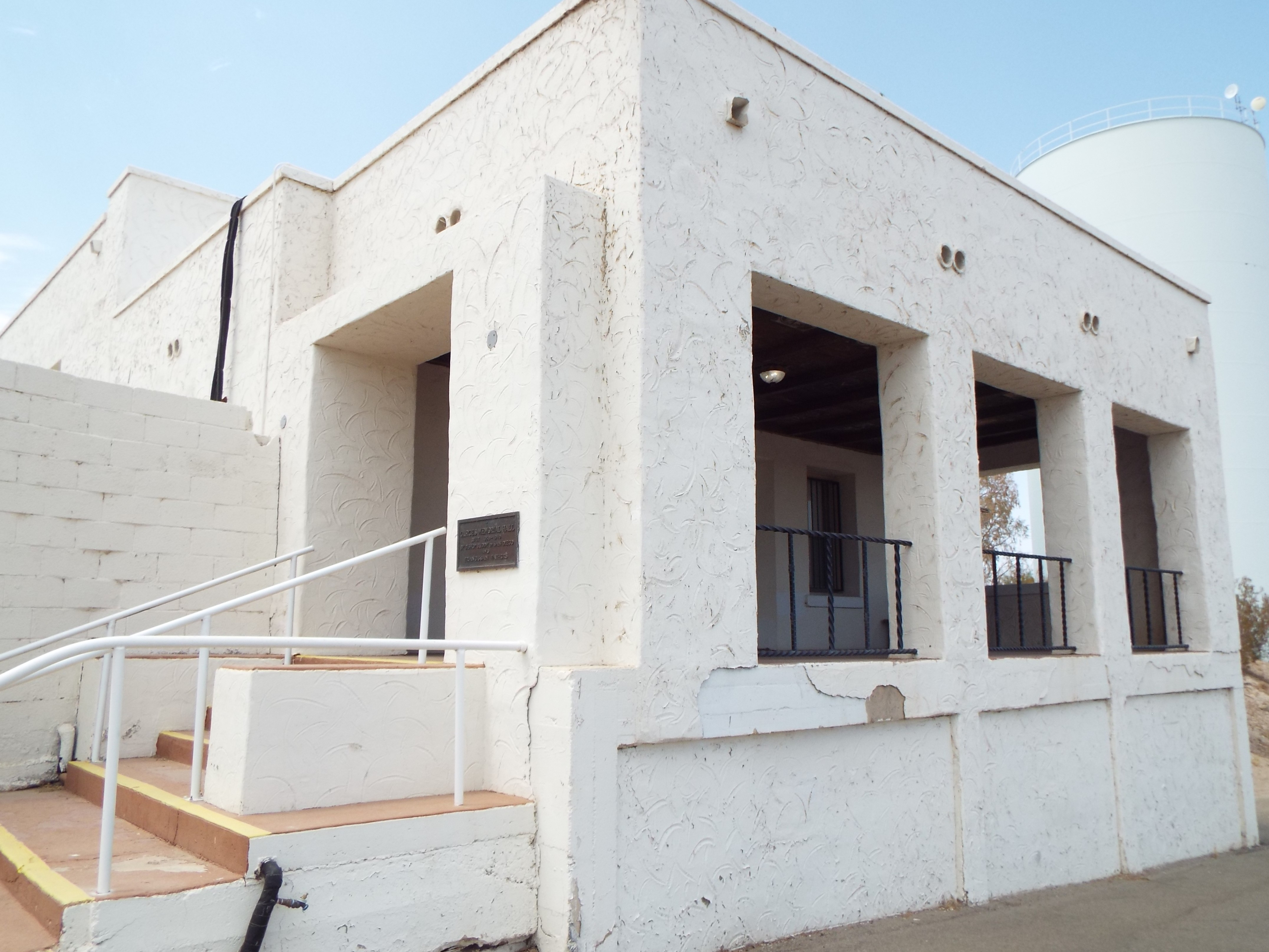
Father Garcés Memorial Hall

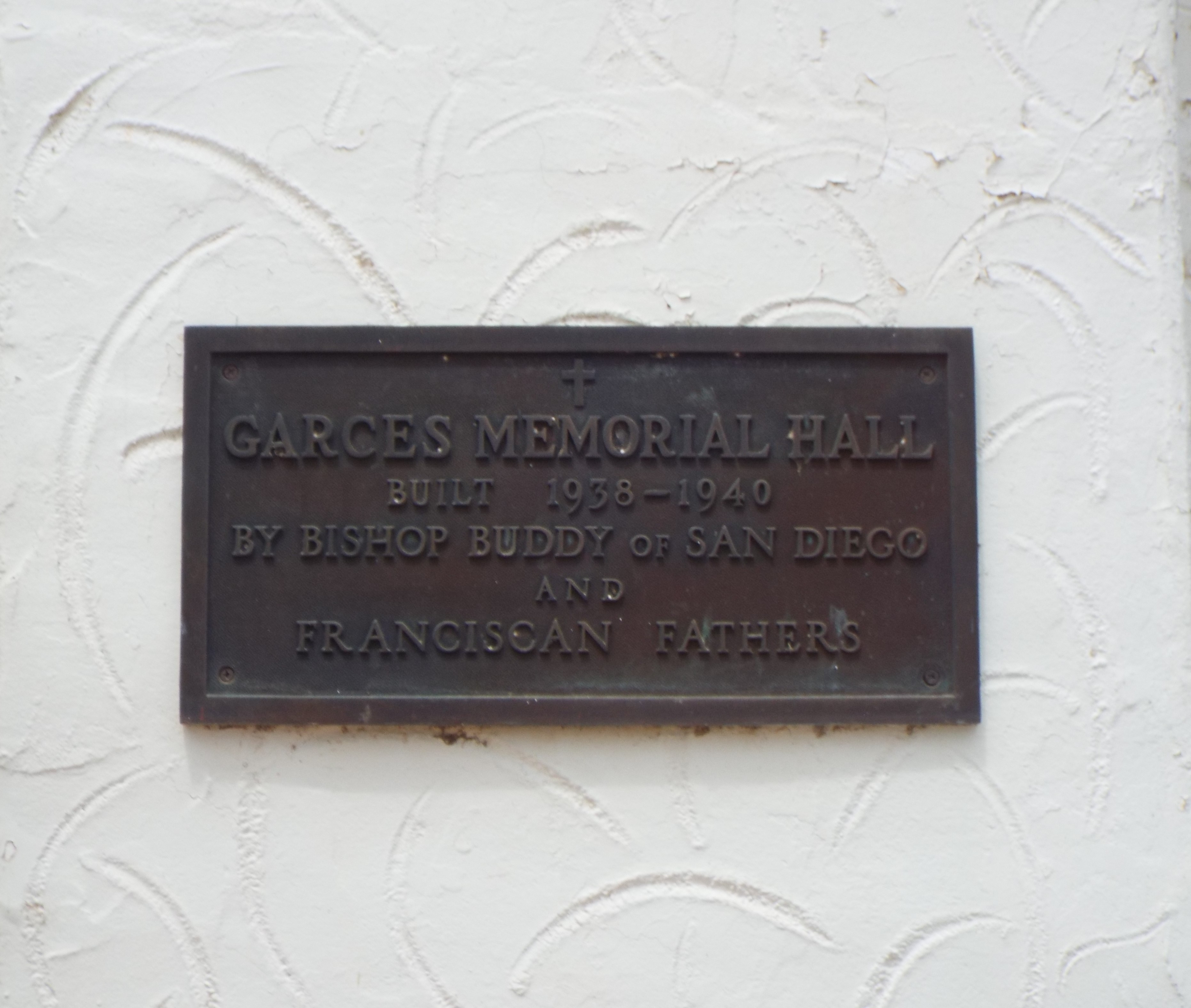
Father Garcés Memorial Hall marker

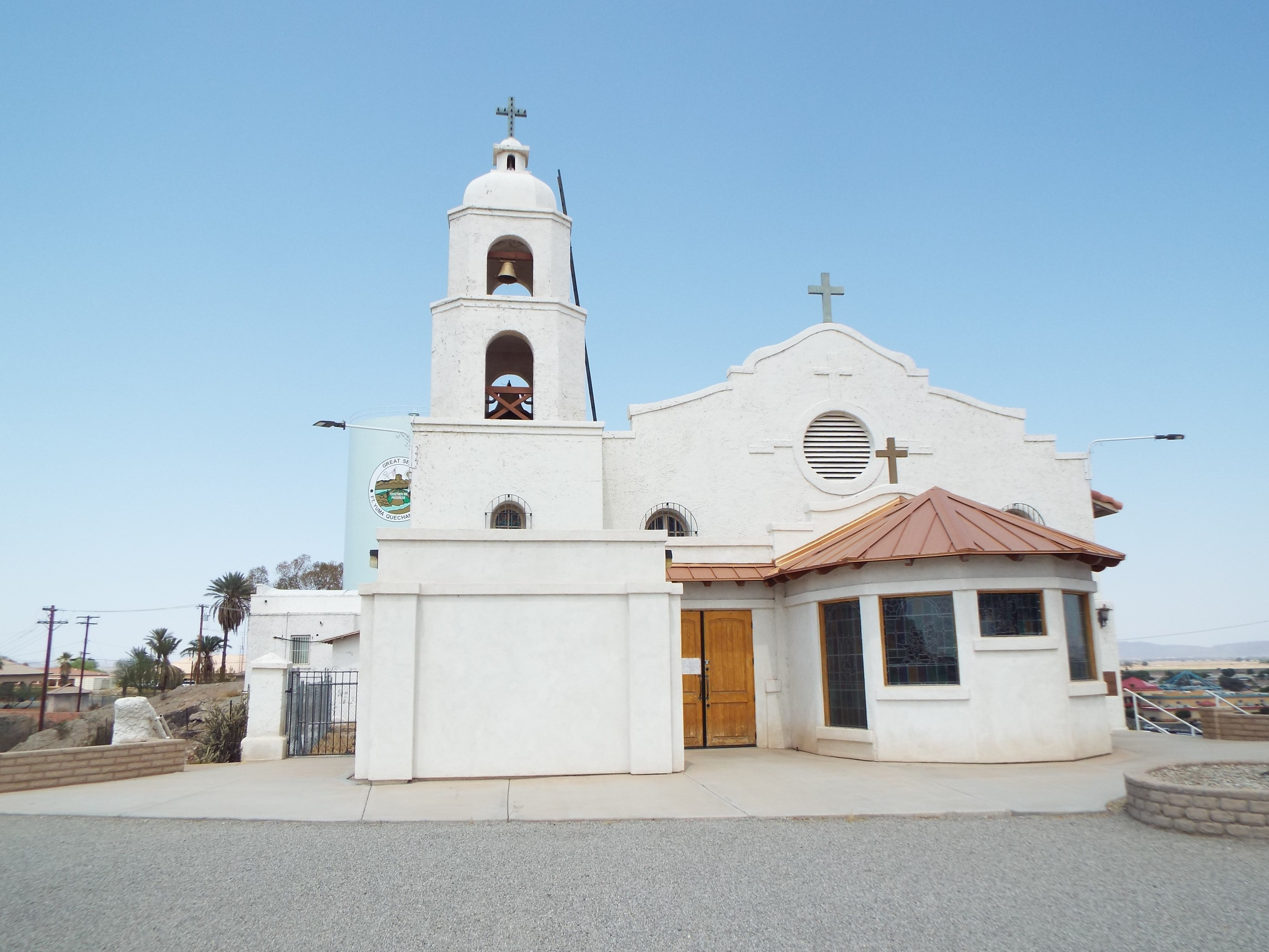
St. Thomas Indian Mission Catholic Church

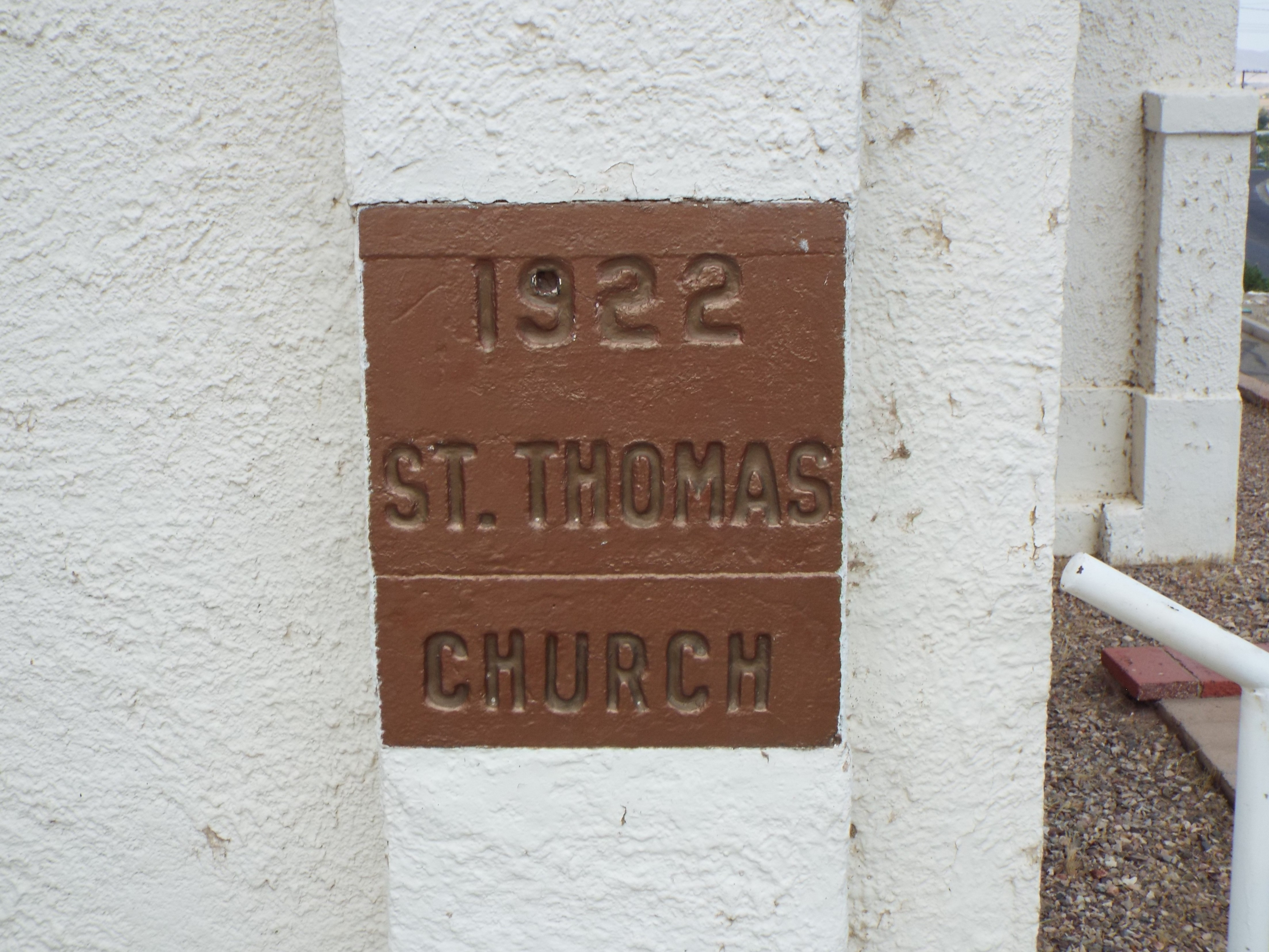
St. Thomas Indian Mission Catholic Church marker

== See also ==
- California Historical Landmarks in Imperial County
- California Historical Landmark
