= List of ghost towns in Arizona =

This is a partial list of ghost towns in Arizona in the United States. Most ghost towns in Arizona are former mining boomtowns that were abandoned when the mines closed. Those not set up as mining camps often became mills or supply points supporting nearby mining operations.

== Conditions ==
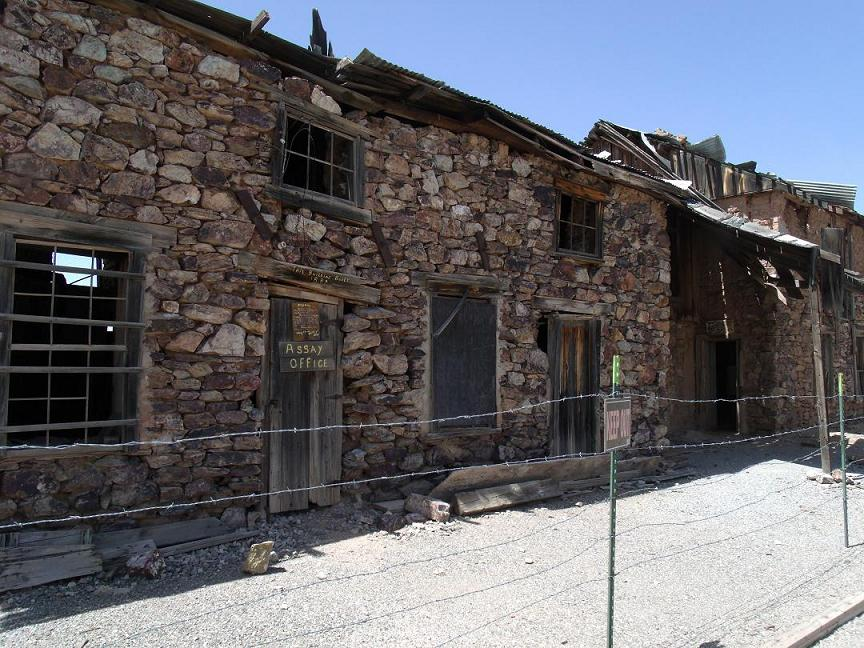
1881 Assay Office of Vulture City

Ghost towns can include sites in various states of disrepair and abandonment. Some sites no longer have any trace of buildings or civilization and have reverted to empty land. Other sites are unpopulated but still have standing buildings. Still others may support full-time residents, though usually far less than at their historical peak, while others may now be museums or historical sites.

For ease of reference, the sites listed here are placed into one of the following general categories.

Barren site

- Site is no longer in existence
- Site has been destroyed, covered with water, or reverted to empty land
- May have a few difficult to find foundations/footings at most

Neglected site

- Little more than rubble remains at the site
- Dilapidated, often roofless buildings remain at the site

Abandoned site

- Building or houses still standing, but all or almost all are abandoned
- No population, with the possible exception of a caretaker
- Site no longer in use, except for one or two buildings

Semi-abandoned site

- Buildings or houses still standing, but most are abandoned
- A few residents may remain

Historic site

- Buildings or houses still standing
- Site has been converted to a historical site, museum, or tourist attraction
- Still a busy community, but population is smaller than its peak years

== Ghost towns ==
Town name	Other name(s)	Location	County	Settled	Abandoned	Current status	Remarks
Adamana			Apache	1896		Semi-abandoned site	Originally the place was known as Adam Hanna's, as time passed and more people came to visit, the elision of a few letters gave us the name Adamana.
Adamsville	Sanford		Pinal	1866	1920s	Neglected site	Original farming town mostly destroyed in a flood, now farmland. The remnant abandoned by the 1920s. Only its cemetery and some ruins remain.
Agua Caliente			Maricopa	1858		Neglected site	Hotel, ruins of a stone house and a swimming pool.
Alamo Crossing	Alimo		Mohave	1899	1918	Submerged	Submerged in Alamo Lake.
Alexandra			Yavapai	1875	c. 1903	Barren site	The town is located in Peck Canyon and was named Alexandra after Mrs. T.M. Alexander, a founder and the first lady to be at the town.
Algert			Coconino	1883	1921	Neglected site	Walls of some of the school buildings, and some of the walls of the trading post are still standing.
Allen	Gunsight, Allen City		Pima	c. 1880	c. 1886	Barren site	Allen was founded by John Brackett Allen, he named his town after himself.
Alma	Stringtown		Maricopa	1880		Historic site	Mormon settlement now part of Mesa, Arizona.
Alma			Pinal	1891	1898	Abandoned site	Wooden water tanks, concrete ore chute, and metal ore buckets, etc. as well as a small slag heap remain on the site within private property. A settlement with a post office, 6 miles above Old Camp Grant on the west side of the San Pedro River.
Alto	El Plomo		Santa Cruz	1907	1933	Neglected site	Adobe Walls of old Post office and Sign for "Alto Camp". Historic Mining district back to the 18th Century.
American Flag			Pinal	c. 1879	c. 1884		The post office was moved to the American Flag Ranch in 1880. The building still stands, and is the oldest surviving territorial post office building in Arizona.
American Ranch	Lee's Ranch		Yavapai	1863	c. 1883	Barren site	A stage stop on Mint Wash in Little Chino Valley on the Hardyville–Prescott Road with a large hotel for travelers.
Angel Camp			Maricopa				
Apron Crossing			Yavapai				
Aravaipa	Dunlap		Graham				Originally named Dunlap after Burt Dunlap, the local rancher who established it in 1882.
Aubrey Landing	Aubrey, Aubrey City		Mohave	c. 1860	c. 1886	Barren site	A steamboat landing, later inundated when Lake Havasu was formed
Aura			Graham	1899			
Aztec			Yuma	1880s		Semi-abandoned site	Former railroad station
Barcelona			Pinal	1880s		Site completely devoured by mine	Segregated town near Kelvin
Bellevue			Gila	1906	1927	Abandoned site	Town was built to harbor the Gibson Cooper Mine
Big Bug	Bigbug, Red Rock		Yavapai	1862	c. 1910	Barren site	Town was founded by Theodore Boggs during the American Civil War. Boggs' father was the former governor of Missouri, Lilburn Boggs, who helped drive the Mormons out during the Missouri Mormon War.
Black Diamond			Cochise				
Bonita			Graham	c. 1885	1950	Abandoned site	Catered to Fort Grant
Boyles	Carpenter		Greenlee	1904	1908	Barren site	Farming and ranching community at the mouth of the Blue River (Arizona)
Bradshaw City			Yavapai	c. 1860	c. 1880	Barren site	Town supported the Tiger Mine. Namesake of its founder, William D. Bradshaw.
Brigham City			Navajo	1876	1881	Historic site	Founded by member of the Church of Jesus Christ of Latter-day Saints near the present city of Winslow in 1876, it was one and one-half miles north of Winslow's current city center, along the Little Colorado River. It was organized as a Latter-Day Saints ward in 1878, but by 1881 it had been abandoned.
Bumble Bee			Yavapai	1863		Semi-abandoned site	Privately owned, few residents.
Calabasas	Calabazas		Santa Cruz	1866	1913	Abandoned site	Was a Tohono O'odham Village, Mexican Garrison, Military Base, mining town. Town was known as the gateway to Mexico and had the finest hotel from San Francisco to Denver.
Camp Crittenden			Santa Cruz	1867	1873	Semi-abandoned site	Private property, named Camp Crittenden by Generals Orders No. 57 Department of California, September 30, 1867, in honor of Thomas S. Crittenden, Col. 32nd U.S. Infantry Major General U.S. Volunteers. Established to protect settlements of Babocomari.
Camp Reno			Gila	1867	1870	Neglected site	Area was once occupied by the United States Army to keep surveillance on the Apache. Ransom B. Moore bought the property in about 1883 and operated the Reno Ranch until his death in 1904; his son William sold it sometime after.
Canelo			Santa Cruz	c. 1904		Semi-abandoned site	Several historic buildings remain, including a one-room schoolhouse and a United States Forest Service ranger station complex.
Canyon Diablo		Exit 230 off Interstate 40	Coconino	1882	Before 1947	Neglected	Only existed because of an error in constructing a railway bridge, died out shortly after the bridge was completed
Cascabel			Cochise	1916	1936	Semi-abandoned site	Several occupied adobes and ruined adobe walls, adjacent to Cascabel Rd.
Castle Dome			Yuma	1869	1876	Historic site	Site of the Castle Dome Mines Museum.
Castle Dome Landing	Castle Dome City		Yuma	1869	1884	Submerged	A steamboat landing, submerged in Martinez Lake.
Catoctin			Yavapai	c. 1902	c. 1920	Barren site	A small mining town
Cedar			Mohave	c. 1875	c. 1911	Neglected site	gold, silver and copper mining town
Cerbat	Campbell		Mohave	c. 1869	c. 1912	Neglected site	From June 25, 1890, to October 24, 1902, the town was known as Campbell.
Cerro Colorado			Pima	c. 1856	c. 1911	Neglected site	The subject of a lost treasure story
Chaparral			Yavapai	c. 1895	c. 1918	Barren site	
Charleston			Cochise	1879	1888	Neglected site	Maintained by the Bureau of Land Management.
Cherry			Yavapai	1884	1943	Semi-abandoned site	Once a mining town, now the site of a retirement community.
Chloride			Mohave	1863		Semi-abandoned site	
Cleator	Turkey, Turkey Creek		Yavapai				
Clemenceau			Yavapai	1917		Historic site	Now part of Cottonwood, Arizona
Cochise			Cochise			Semi-abandoned site	
Cochran			Pinal	1905	1915		
Colorado City			Yuma	1853	1862	Barren site	Colorado River ferry crossing, destroyed by Great Flood of 1862
Congress			Yavapai				
Contention City	Contention		Cochise	1880	1888	Neglected site	Maintained by the Bureau of Land Management.
Copper Creek			Pinal	1880s	1942	Neglected site	In recent years, several companies have proposed opening a mine here.
Cordes	Antelope Junction		Yavapai	1883	1950s	Semi-abandoned site	
Courtland			Cochise	1908	1942	Abandoned site	Remains of old Jail and Cemetery
Crown King			Yavapai	1894	1954	Historic site	Old Saloon and Many occupied buildings including general store
Curtis	Arizona City		Yavapai	1889	1907		Former mining town. Currently the site of a mining operation, just north of Mayer on Big Bug Creek.
Dome	Swiveler's Station		Yuma	1892	1904	Neglected site	Ruins of an adobe building, cemetery
Duquesne			Santa Cruz	1880s	1920s	Semi-abandoned site	Several wood buildings including Westinghouse home
Ehrenberg	Ehrenburg, Mineral City		La Paz	1863	1915	Neglected site	A steamboat landing, Colorado River ferry, junction of the Bradshaw Trail and La Paz–Wikenburg Road
Fairbank	Junction City, Kendall, Fairbanks		Cochise	1883	1970s	Abandoned site	Maintained by the Bureau of Land Management.
Fortuna	Fortuna Mine		Yuma	1896	1924	Neglected site	Foundation of General Store, Mill and Reservoir. Interpretive hiking trail maintained with signs by USMC–Yuma Marines. Mine shaft, Sign in log.
Fort Buchanan	Battle site		Santa Cruz	1857	1865	Barren site	Civil War era Frontier Post, The post was officially abandoned in 1861 but during the American Civil War troops of the California Column occasionally manned the post. In February 1865 Apaches attacked and forced the small garrison to retreat.
Galeyville			Cochise	1881	1882	Barren site	
Geronimo			Graham				
Gillett	Gillette		Yavapai	1878	1880	Neglected site	Gillett Cemetery and nearby Burfind Hotel foundations.
Gila City	Ligurta		Yuma	1858	1863	Barren site	Destroyed by the Great Flood of 1862
Gleeson	Turquoise		Cochise	1870s	1940	Semi-abandoned site	Town was first settled as Turquoise in the 1870s in what was then the Arizona Territory, then later re-established as Gleeson in 1900.
Goldfield	Youngsburg		Pinal	1892, 1920	1898, 1926	Historic site	Goldfield revived as Youngsburg in 1920, is now a tourist attraction.
Goldroad	Acme		Mohave	1902	1942		Died out due to railroad closure
Guthrie			Greenlee	1880s	1922	Neglected site	An important railroad stop along the Arizona & New Mexico Railway. Transfer point of the Morenci Southern Railway.
Hardyville			Mohave	1864	1883	Historic site	Hardyville Pioneer Cemetery, a historic landmark and an unofficial historical marker for nearby Bullhead City, Arizona. A steamboat landing, Colorado River ferry, mining town, junction of the Mojave Road and Hardyville–Prescott Road
Harshaw	Durazno		Santa Cruz	1880	1960	Semi-abandoned site	Cemetery, several adobe walls, flat townsite pads still visible
Helvetia			Pima	1891	1921	Neglected site	small cemetery on approach with period graves, road to gunsite pass, small adobe wall and smelter stone wall still visible
Hilltop			Cochise	1880s	1940s	Neglected site	
House Rock			Coconino			Semi-abandoned site	
Hyder			Yuma				
Jerome Junction			Yavapai	1894	1920		
Johnson			Cochise				
Kentucky Camp			Pima	1874	1912	Historic site	Maintained by US Forest Service
Klondyke			Graham	c. 1900		Historic site	Maintained by US Forest Service
Kofa	Kofa Station		Yuma				
La Laguna	Laguna		Yuma	1860	1862	Submerged	Mining camp. Site under Mittry Lake
La Paz			La Paz	1862	1875	Neglected site	Site of the first major gold strike along the Colorado River. Steamboat landing to 1866, Yuma County seat until 1871.
Lochiel			Santa Cruz	c. 1880	1986	Neglected site	
Metcalf			Greenlee	1889	1936	Neglected site	A copper mining town, died after the ore ran out in 1918. Its post office lasted from 1899 to 1936.
Millville			Cochise				
Marinette			Maricopa			Barren site	Sun City was built on the site of Marinette in the 1960s
McMillenville	McMillianville, McMillanville		Gila	1876	c. 1886	Neglected site	
Mohave City	Mojave City		Mohave	1863	1938	Barren site	A steamboat landing, mining and garrison town, absorbed into Fort Mojave Indian Reservation.
Mowry	The Patagonia Mine		Santa Cruz	1858	1880	Abandoned	Originally a lead and silver mine called "The Patagonia Mine" which was renamed after Lieutenant Sylvester Mowry purchased the mine from the local Mexicans in 1860. Mowry was later arrested by General H. Carleton in 1862 and charged with selling lead to the confederate army. After his release Mowry returned to England where he hoped to get money so that he could resume his mining operations, but died before this was possible.
Mt. Trumbull	Bundyville		Mohave	1916	c. 1970	Abandoned site, historic site	The site is mostly abandoned, but remains home to a reconstruction of a historic schoolhouse. Town was sometimes called Bundyville, after the family that settled the area. As of 2006 one member of the Bundy family still lived alone on a 320-acre ranch near the abandoned town site.
Nothing			Mohave	1977	2005	Abandoned site	An attempted revival occurred sometime after August 2008, but by April 2011, Nothing was marked as abandoned again.
Oatman			Mohave	1902		Historic site	
Obed			Navajo	1876	1877	Barren site	
Octave			Yavapai			Neglected site	
Oro Blanco			Santa Cruz	1873	1915	Neglected site	
Oroville	Oro		Greenlee	1880	1882	Neglected site	A farm community supporting Clifton.
Pantano			Pima	1858	c. 1956	Barren site	
Paradise			Cochise	1901	1943	Barren site	
Pearce			Cochise	1896	1942	Semi-abandoned	Mine Gold/silver workings, general store, cemetery and several occupied dwellings, Our Lady of Victory Catholic Church.
Pedrick's	–		Yuma	1854	1879	?	Steamboat landing on the east bank of the Colorado River, just above the Sonora – Arizona border.
Piedmont			Yavapai				
Pinal City	Pinal		Pinal			Abandoned site	
Ray			Pinal	1958			
Reymert			Pinal				
Rosemont			Pima			Semi-abandoned	Adobe walls at junction, old house now owned by Rosemont Mine. Soon to be destroyed by pit mine. Rosemont Mine
Ruby	Montana Camp		Santa Cruz	1870s	1941	Historic site	25 buildings under roof, including the old jail and houses, the old school, the playground, old mine machinery, buildings and mine workings. Ruby is entirely on private property.
San Rafael			Pima			Barren site	
Salero			Santa Cruz	1884	1890	Neglected site	Old Bunkhouse and Assay Office, now off limits on private property (Gated)
Santa Claus	Santa Claus Acres		Mohave	1937		Abandoned site	
Sacaton (village)	Socatoon		Pinal	1857	1880s	Barren site	One of the 19th century Maricopa villages among the Pima Villages
Sasco			Pinal	1907	1920s	Neglected site	
Signal			Mohave	1877	1932		
Silver Bell	Silverbell	23 Miles West of I-10 Exit 242	Pima	1952	1984	Barren site	4 Miles south of original town of Silverbell. Abandoned due to Asarco Silver Bell mine temporary closure in 1984. Mine was reopened in 1998 and is currently in operation
Simmons	Wilson, Williamson's Valley		Yavapai	1871	1934	Barren site	A stop on the Hardyville–Prescott Road, and a local post office.
Socatoon Station			Pinal	1858	1870s	Barren site	Stagecoach station
Spenazuma			Graham	1898	1899	Barren site	
Stanton	Antelope Station		Yavapai	1863	1905	Historic site	Owned and maintained by the Lost Dutchman Mining Association
Stanwix Station	Flap Jack Ranch, Grinnell's Ranch, Grinnell's Station		Yuma	1858	1880s	Barren site	Stagecoach station. Site of the Skirmish at Stanwix Station, often considered the westernmost engagement of the American Civil War.
Stoddard			Yavapai	1882	1830s	Neglected site	Supported by several nearby copper mines, the town had a smelter, school, stores, and up to 300 people until it was abandoned when the price of copper fell.
Sunset			Navajo	1876	1887	Abandoned site	Only the cemetery remains today
Swansea	Signal		La Paz	1908	1937	Abandoned site	Maintained by the Bureau of Land Management.
Tiger	Schultz		Pinal	1881	1954	Barren site	All structures demolished
Tip Top			Yavapai	1876			
Total Wreck			Pima	1879	c. 1890	Neglected site	Smelter walls and mine still remain, small rock cabin foundation to south, filming location for movie Hombre
Tres Alamos			Cochise	1874	1886	–	
Twin Buttes			Pima	c. 1903	c. 1930	Barren site	Buried under the Twin Buttes Mine. All that remains is the cemetery.
Vulture City			Maricopa	1863	1942	Historic site	Privately owned and operated as a tourist attraction
Washington Camp			Santa Cruz	1880s	1920s	Semi-abandoned site	
Weaver	Weaverville		Yavapai	1863	1900	Neglected site	
Webb			Maricopa				
White Hills			Mohave				
Wilford			Navajo	1883	1926	Barren site	Loose rock foundations.
Wolf Hole			Mohave				
Zeniff			Navajo	1909	1940s	Barren site	Few walls precariously standing amid piles of wood and adobe rubble.

== Images of ghost towns ==
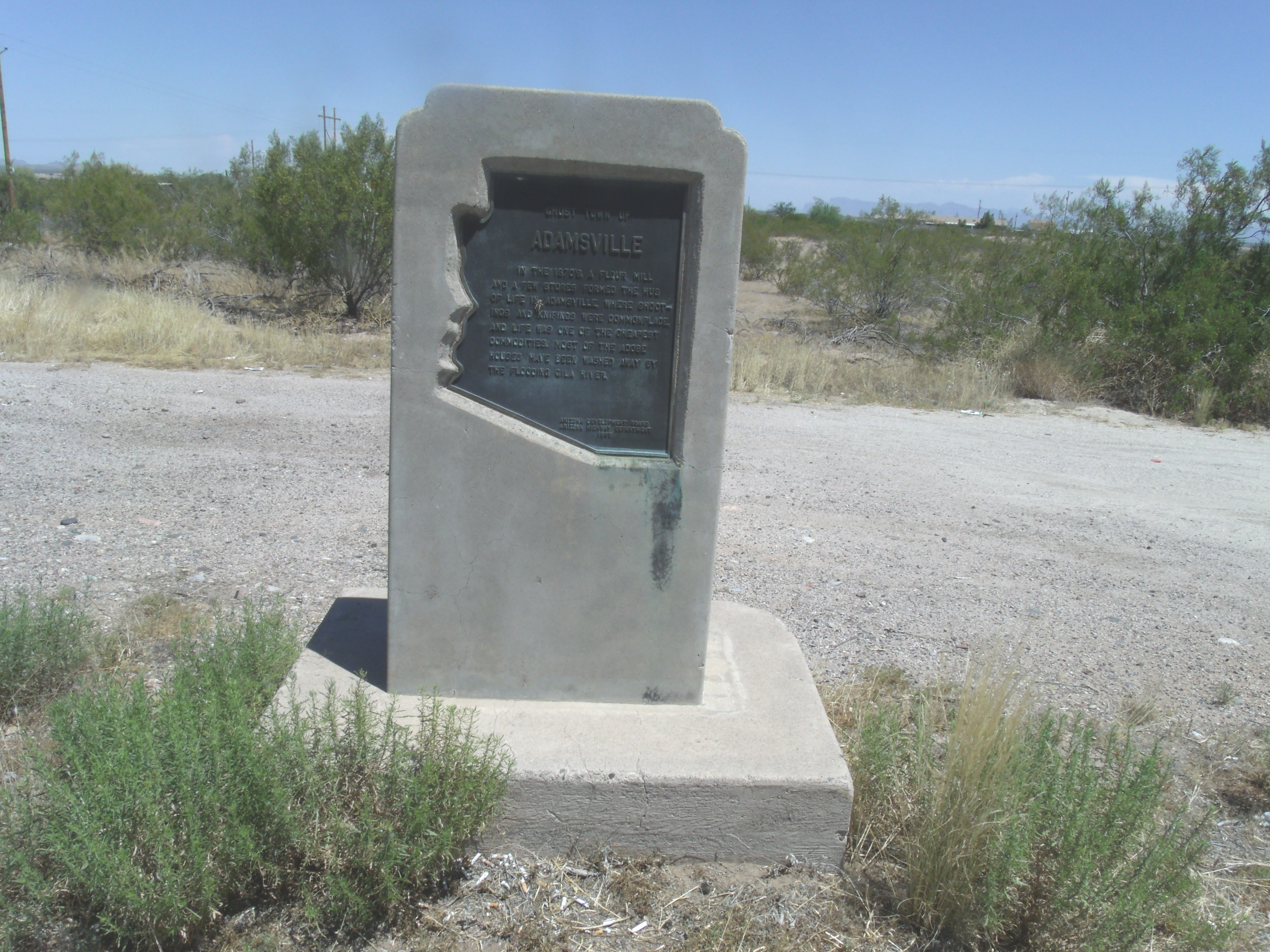
Adamsville ghost town marker

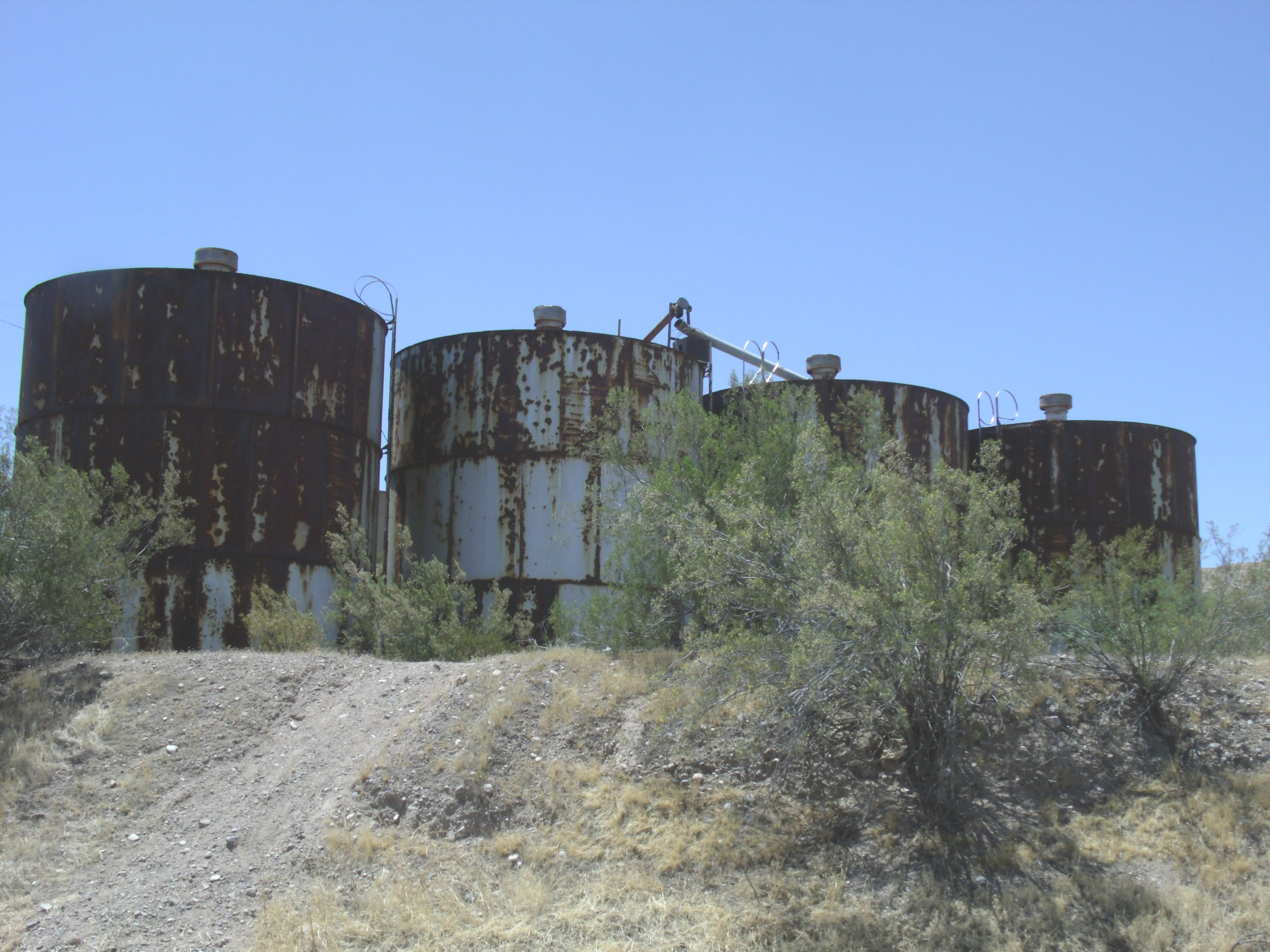
Adamsville ghost town water tanks

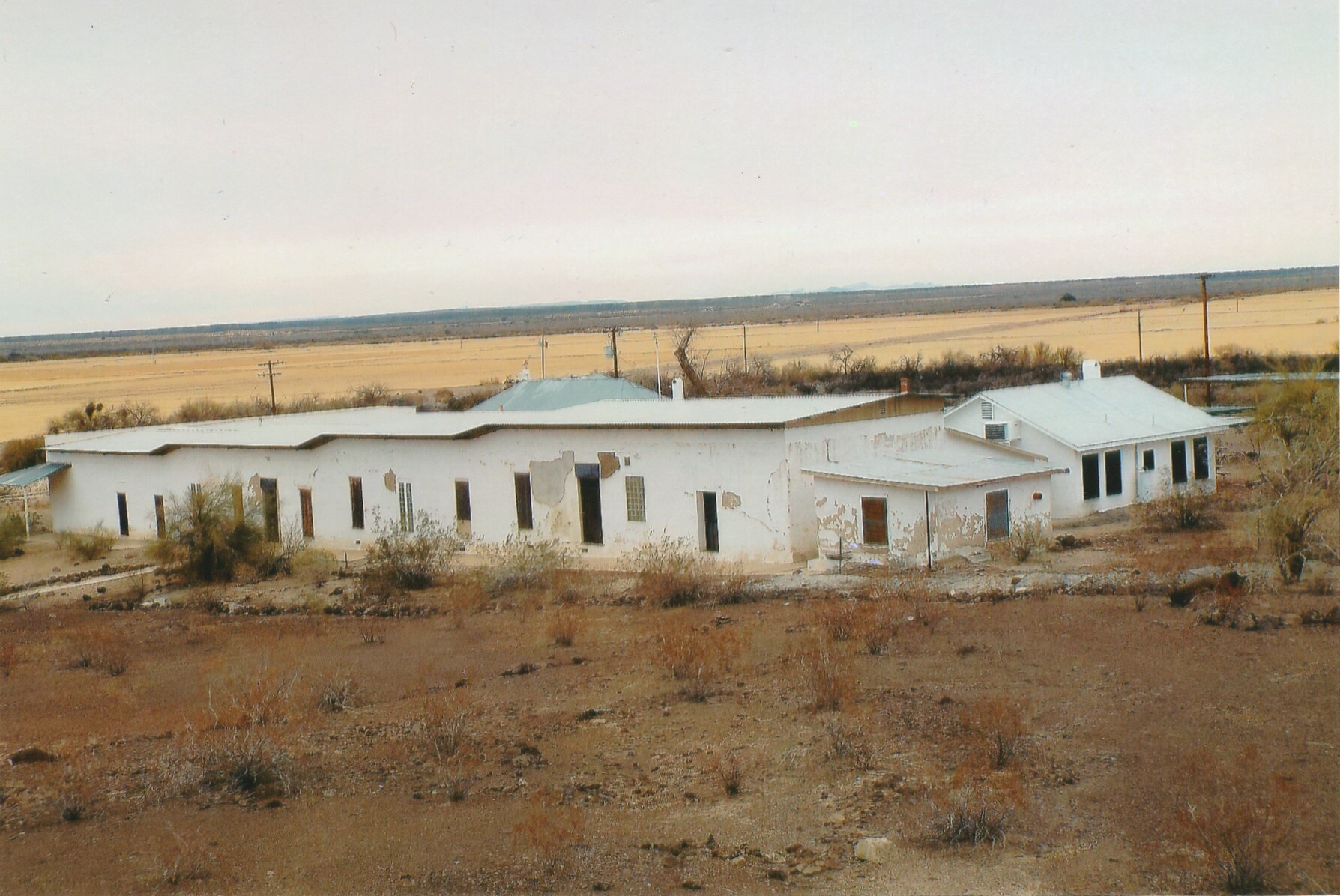
The Agua Caliente Resort

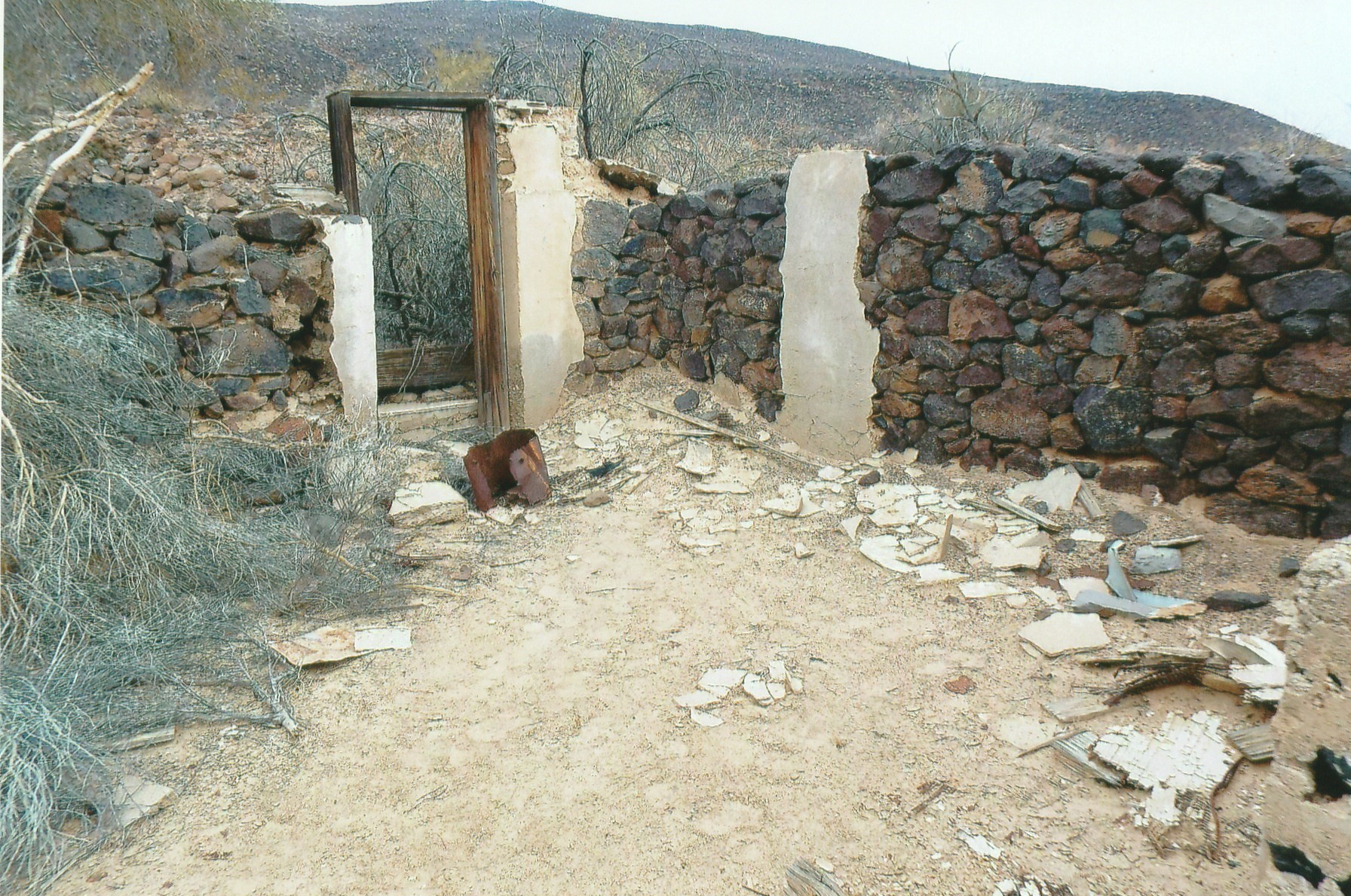
Stone house ruins in Agua Caliente

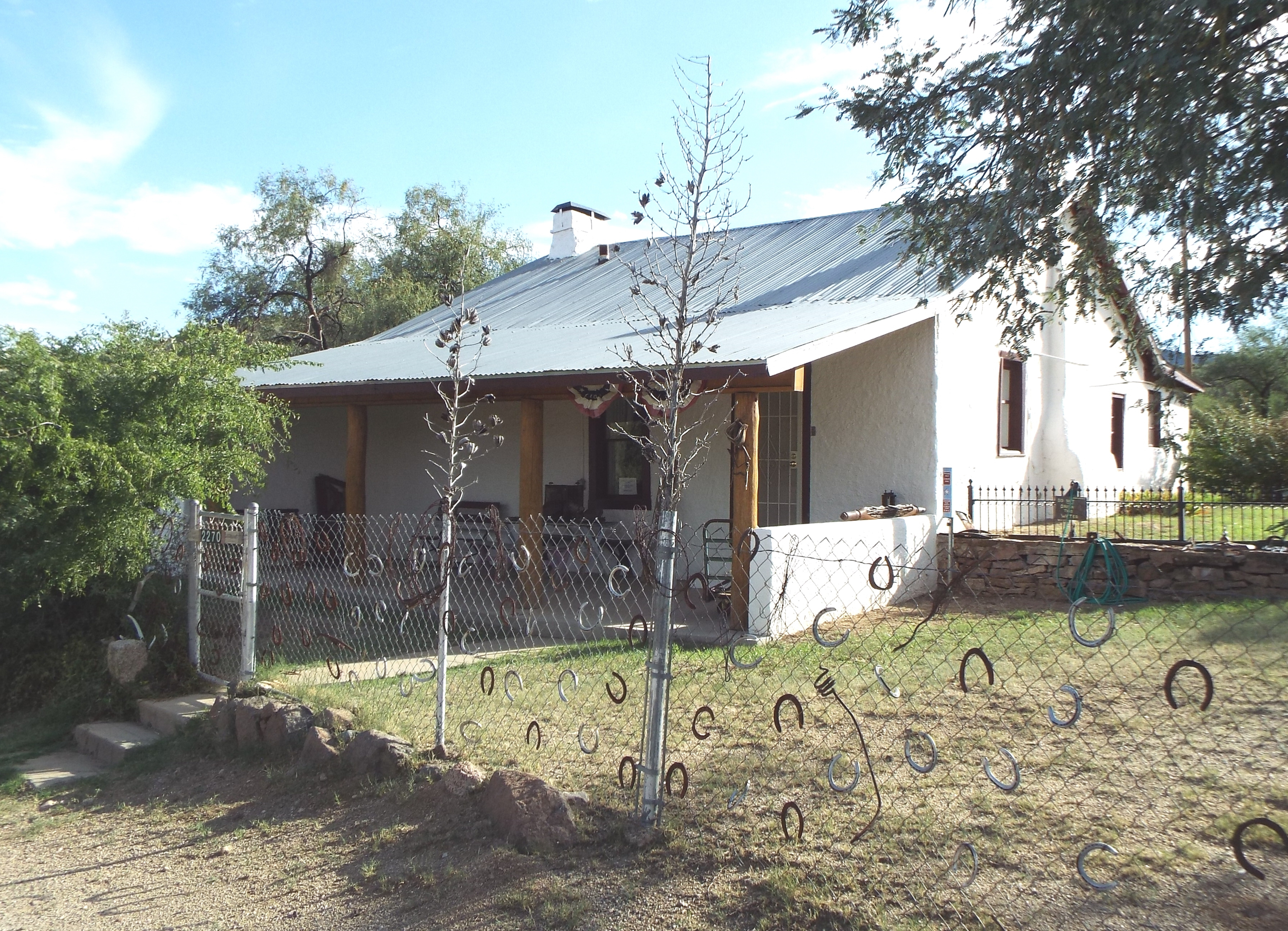
American Flag Post Office Ranch – 1877

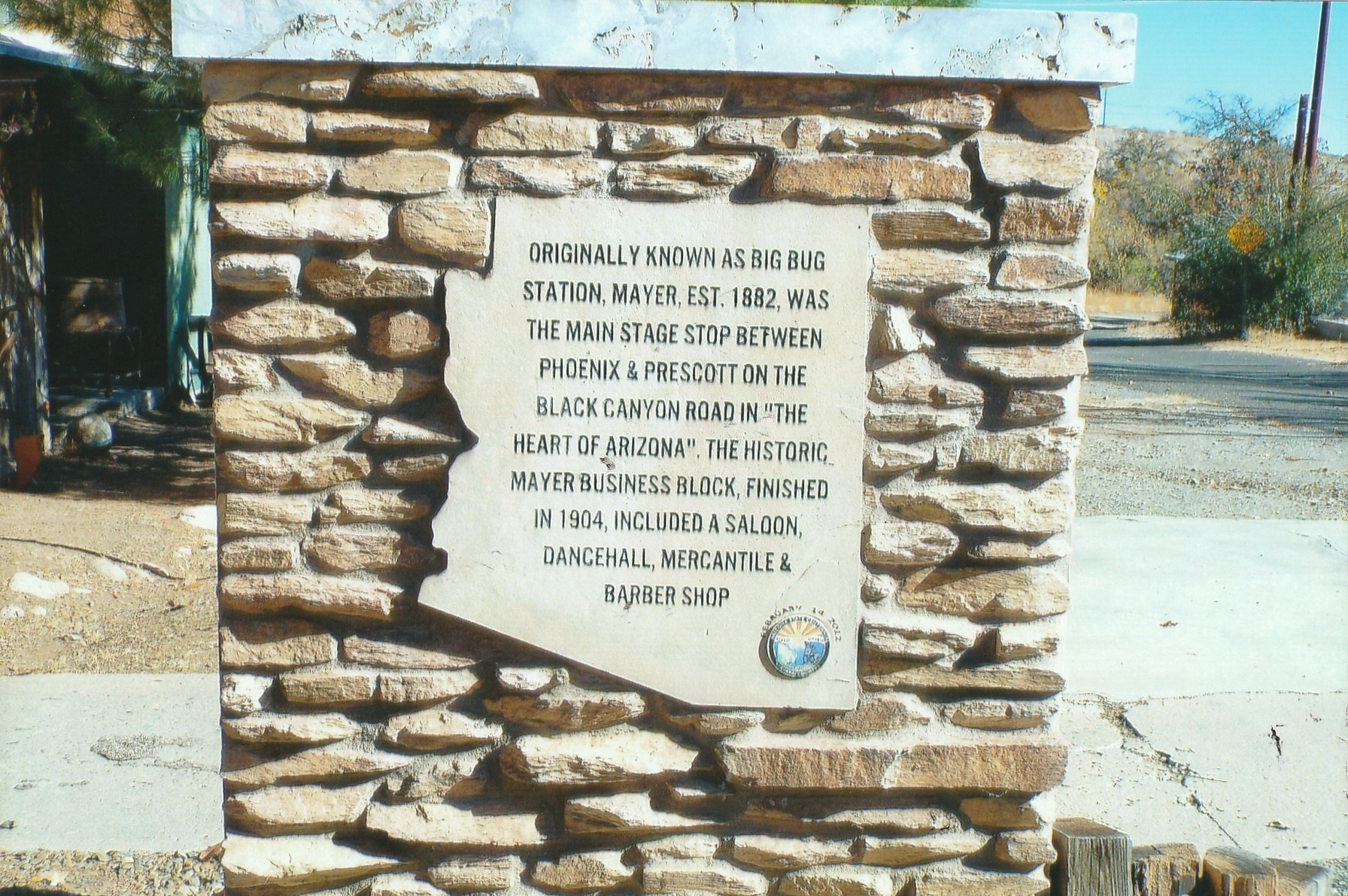
Big Bug marker

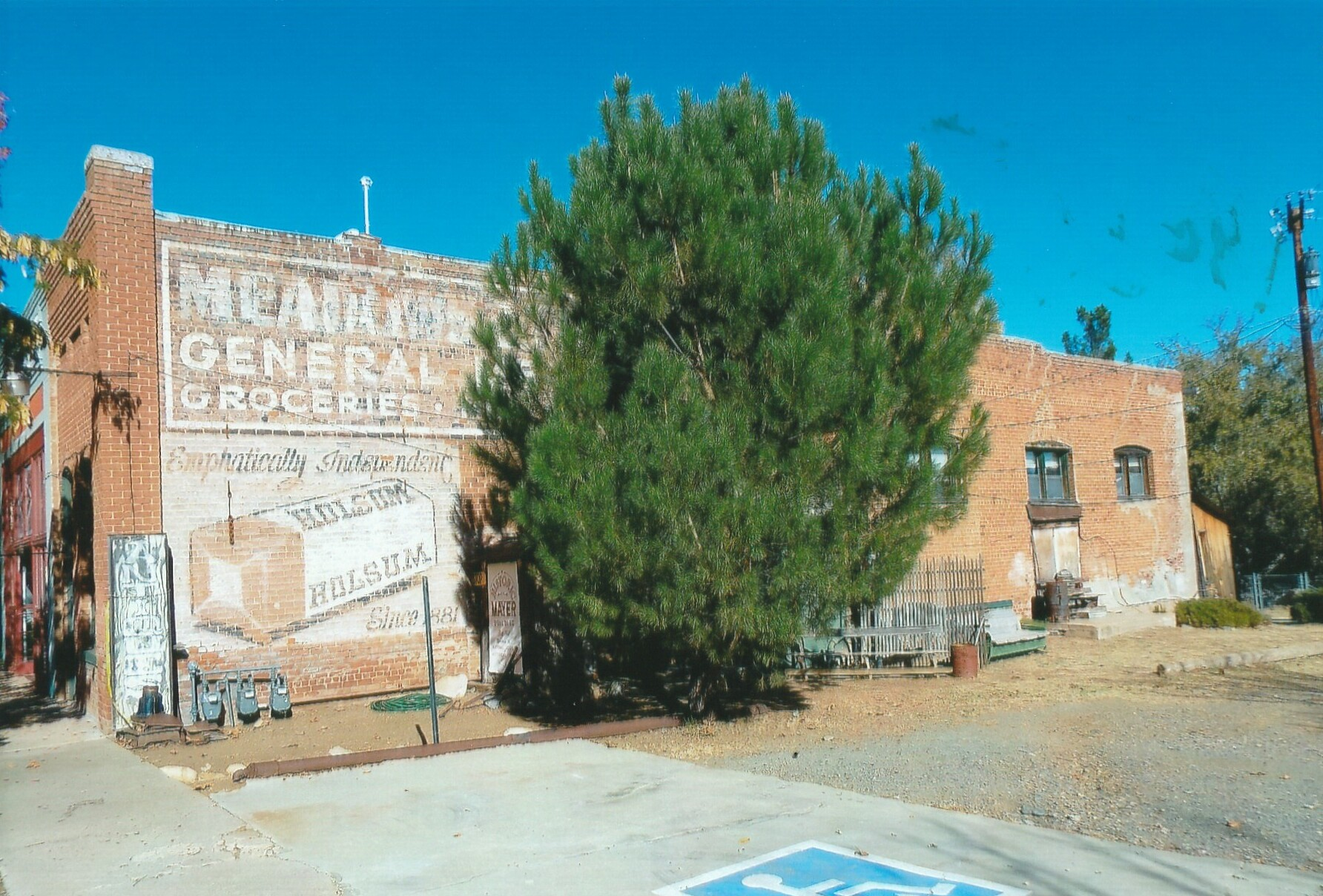
The General Market Store in what once was Big Bug

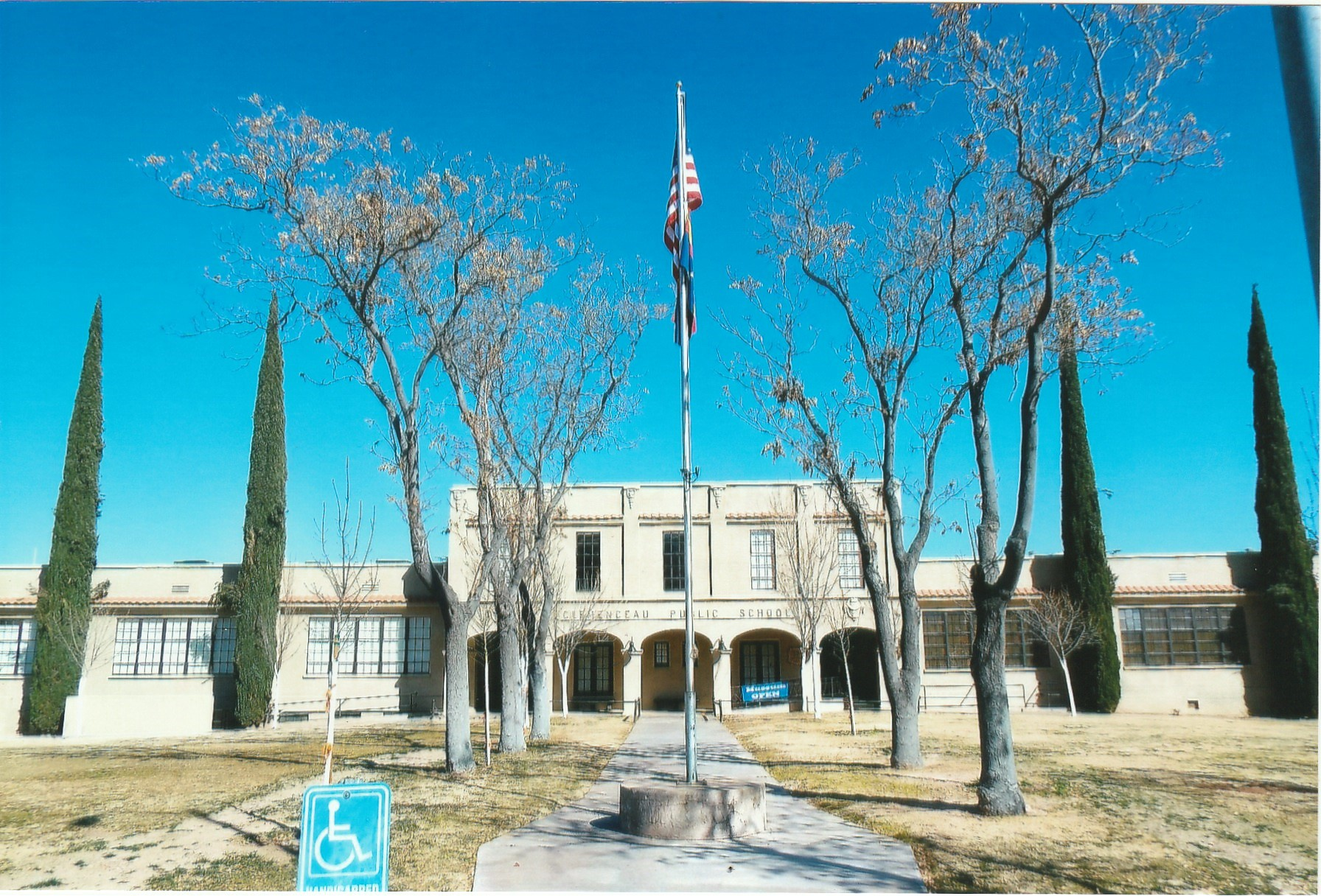
Front view, Clemenceau Public School

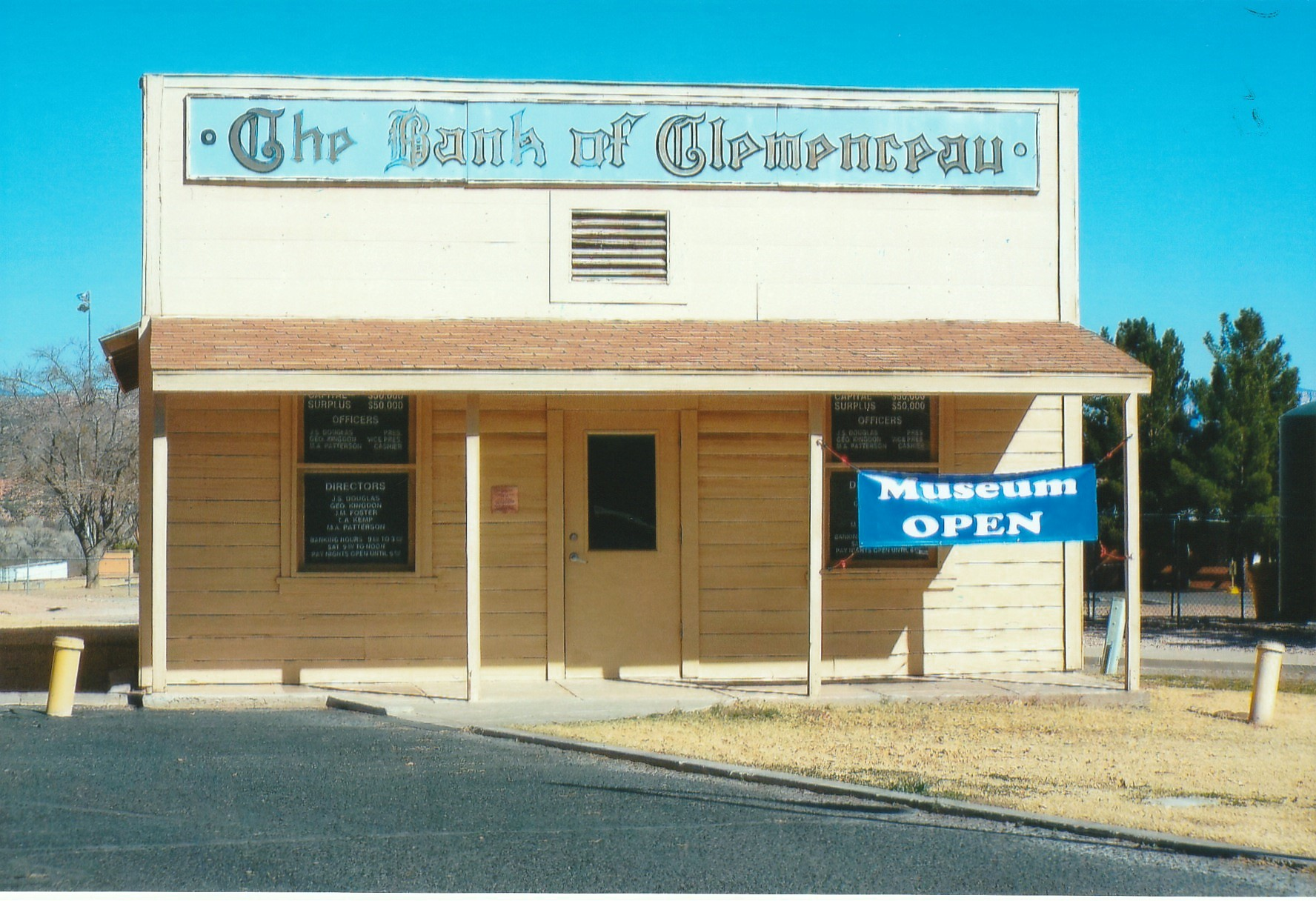
Bank of Clemenceau

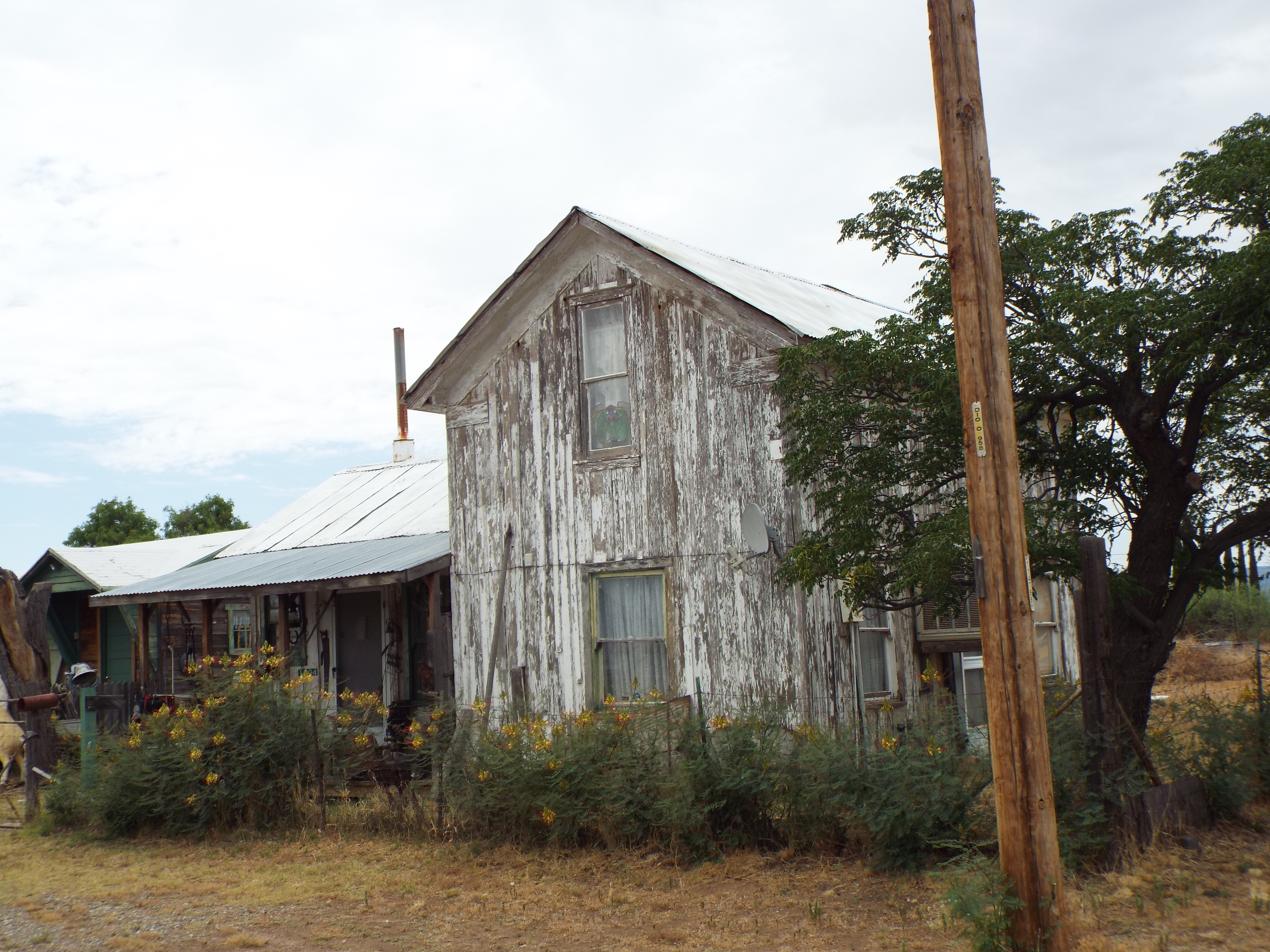
Cochise Southern Pacific Railroad train depot

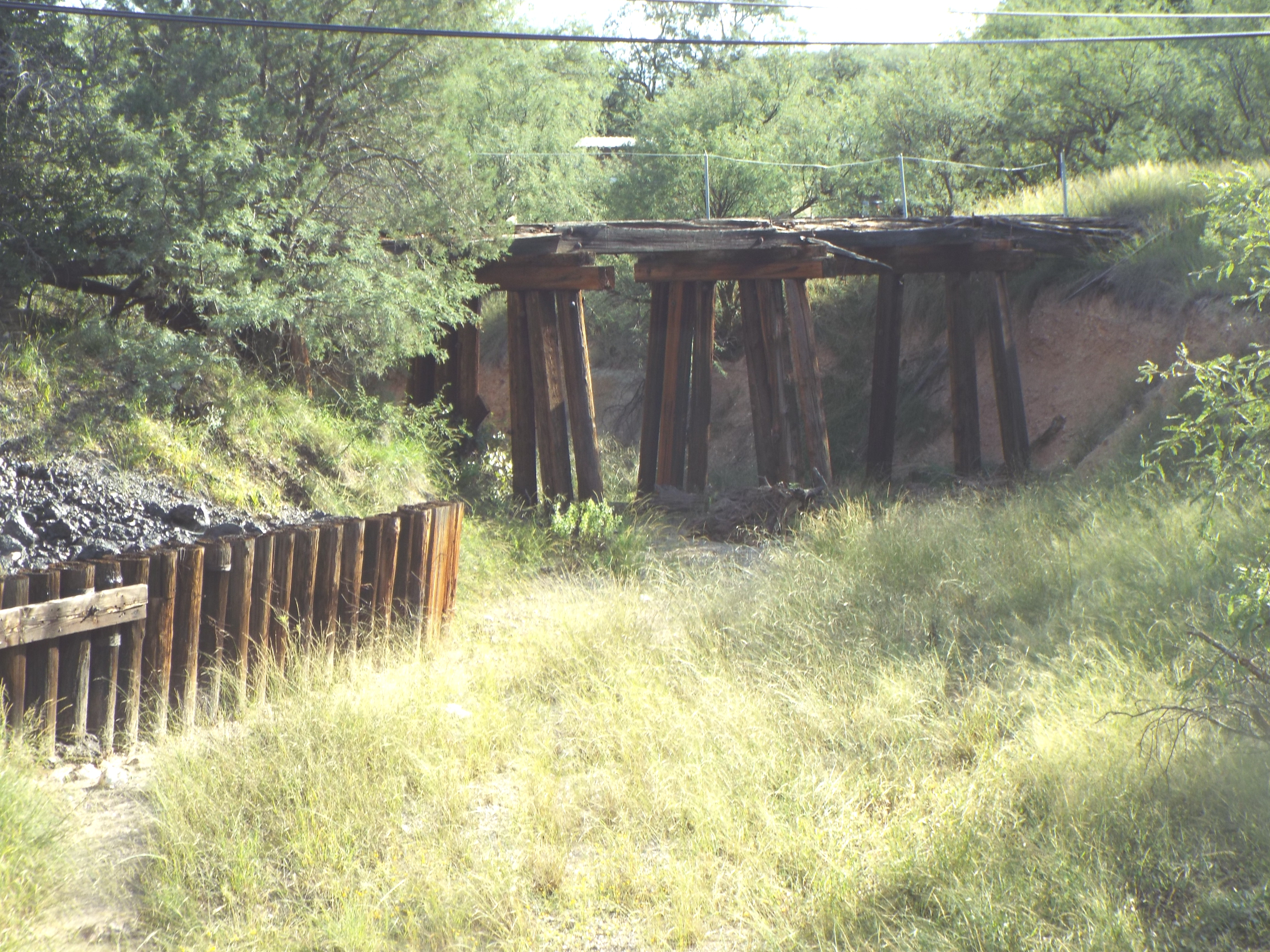
Ruins of the Fort Buchanan Bridge over Sonoita Creek

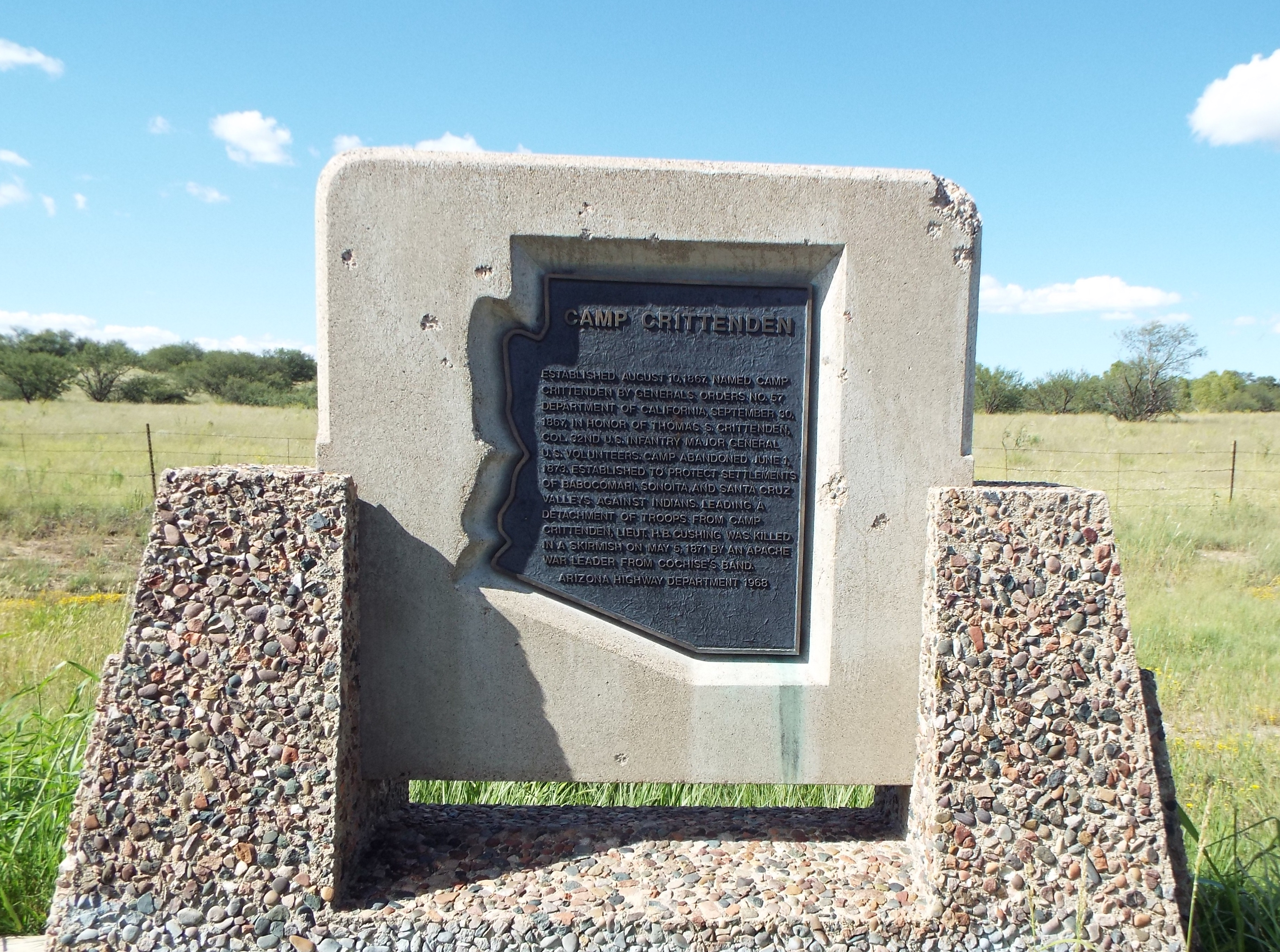
Fort Crittenden historic marker

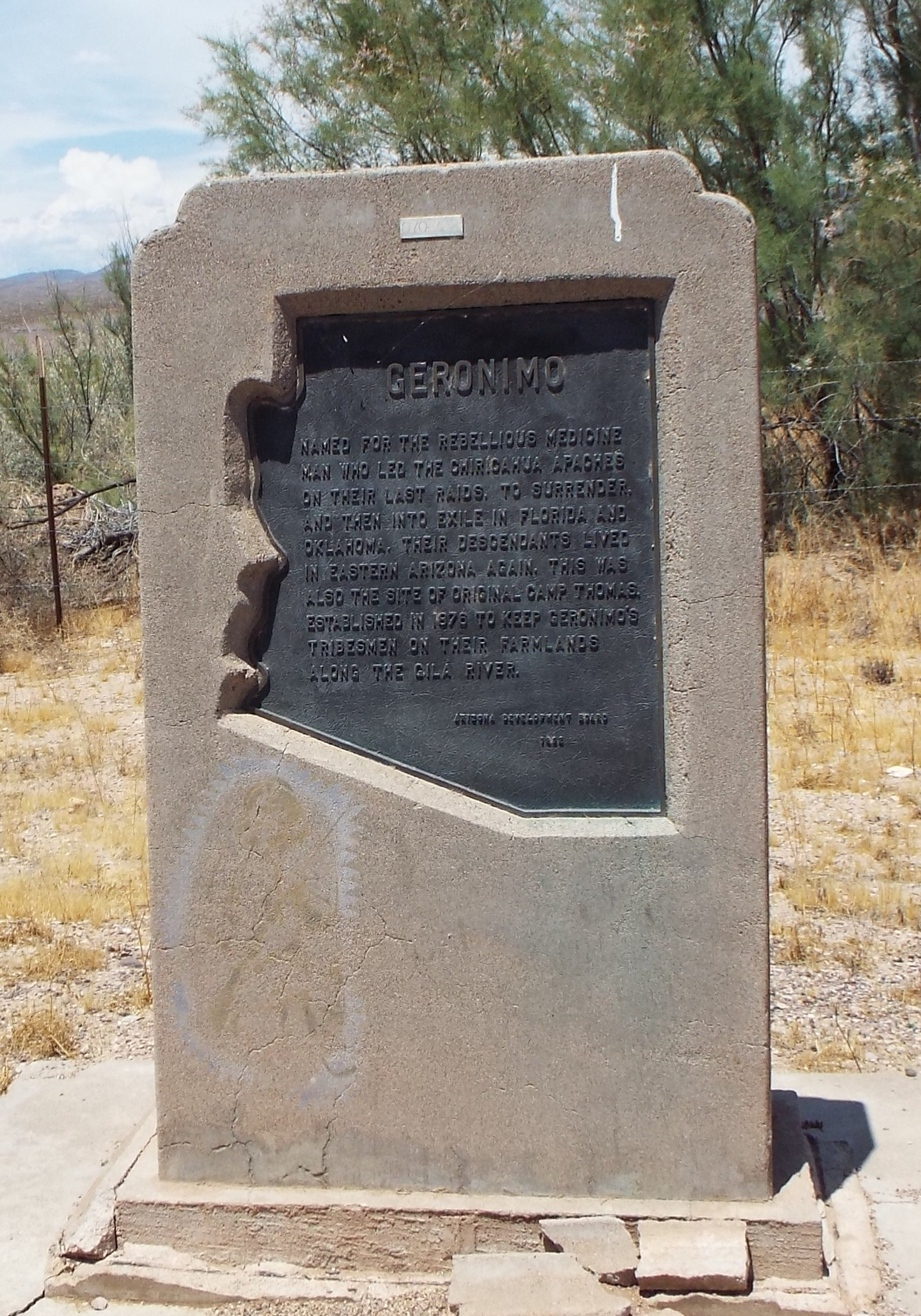
Historic Geronimo town marker

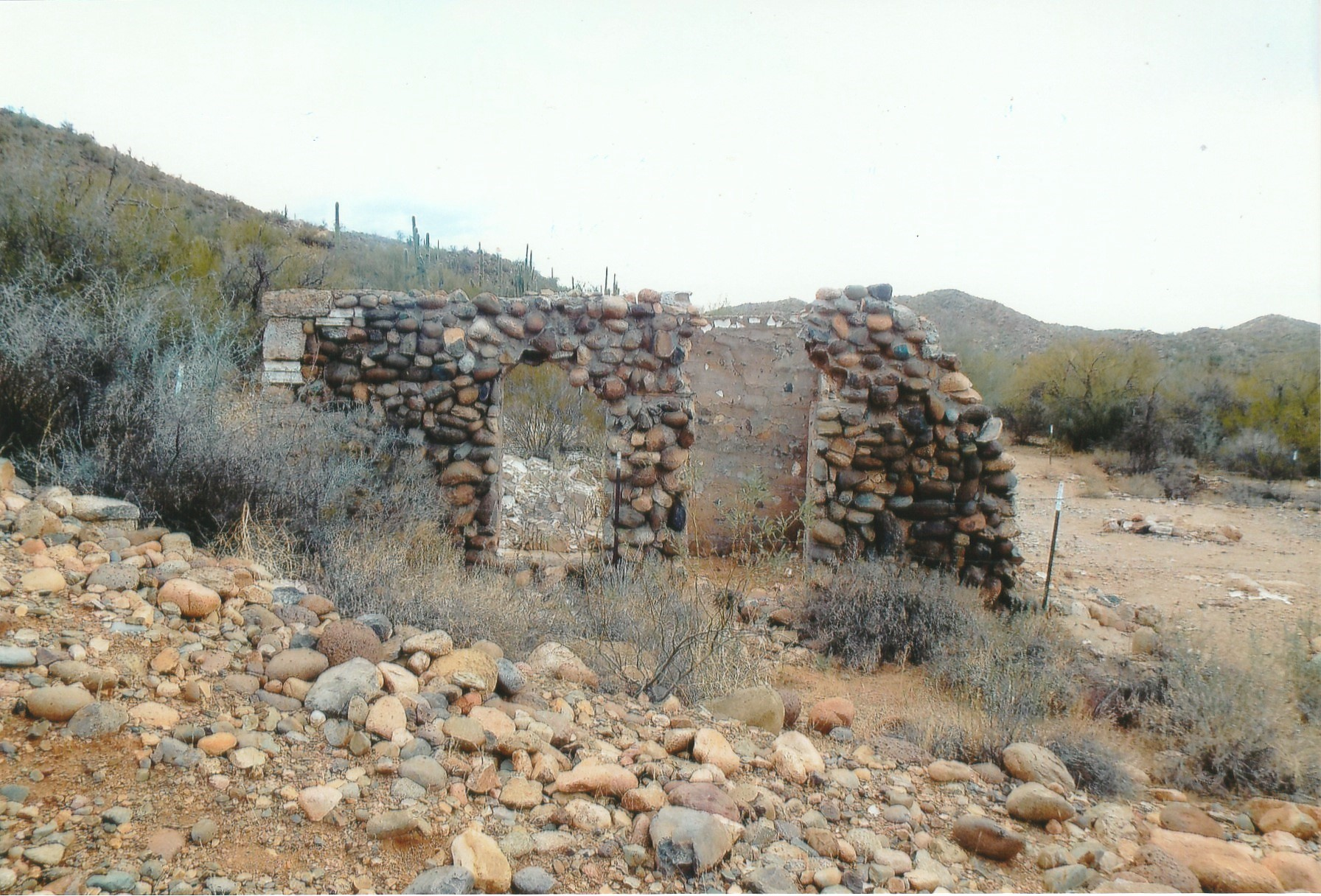
The ruins of the 1878 Burfind Hotel in Gillett

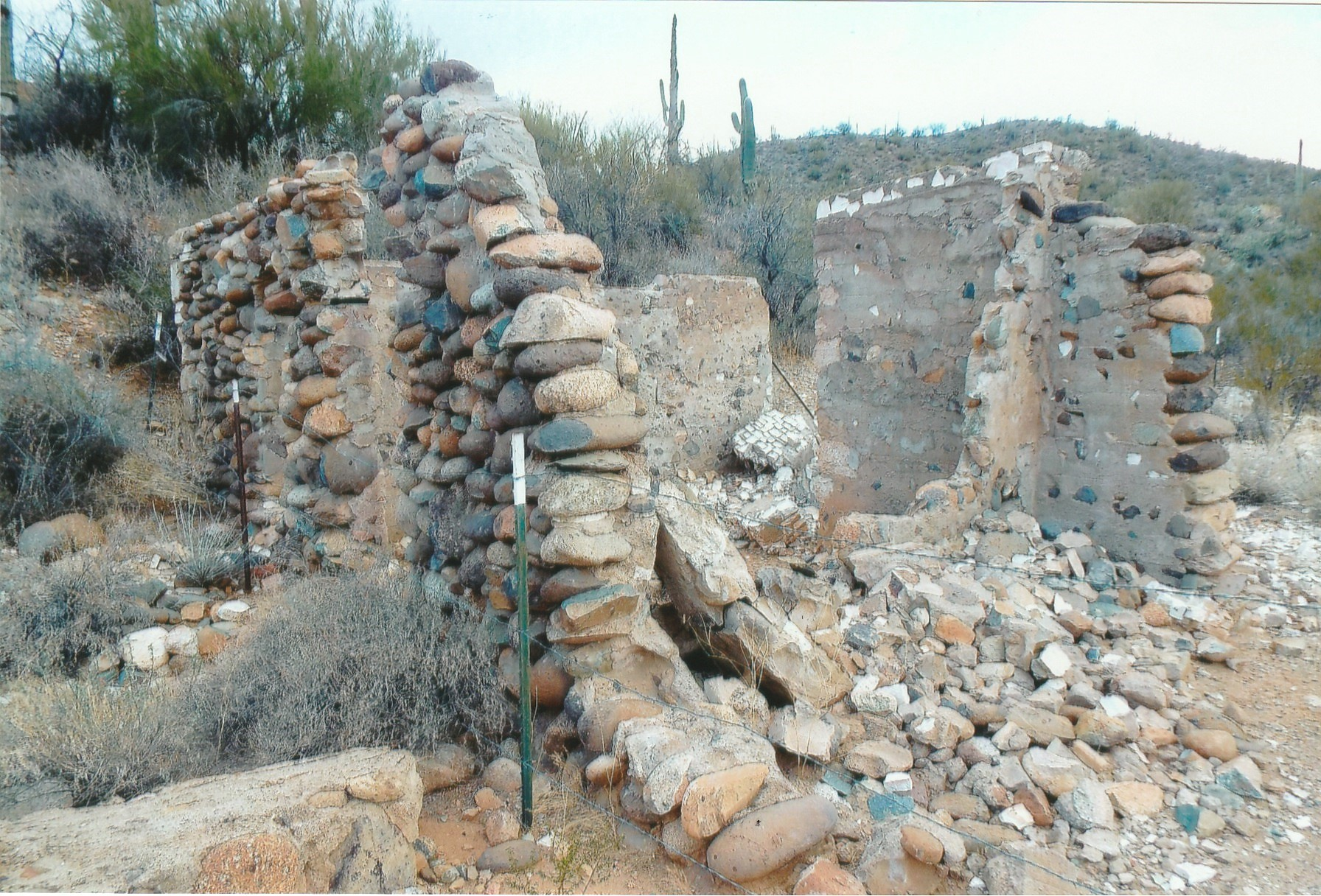
Different view of the ruins of the Burfind Hotel in Gillett

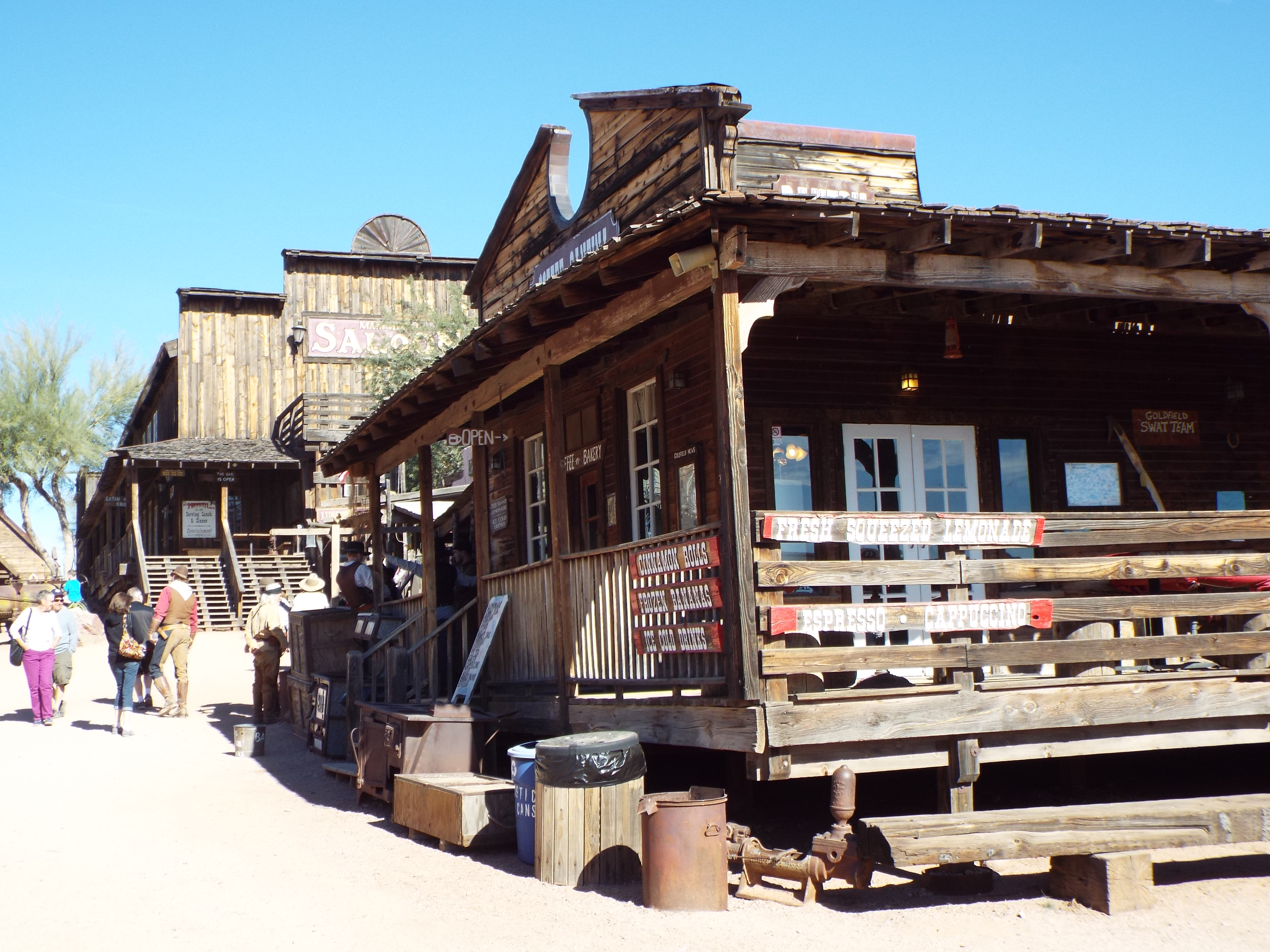
Goldfield's Main Street

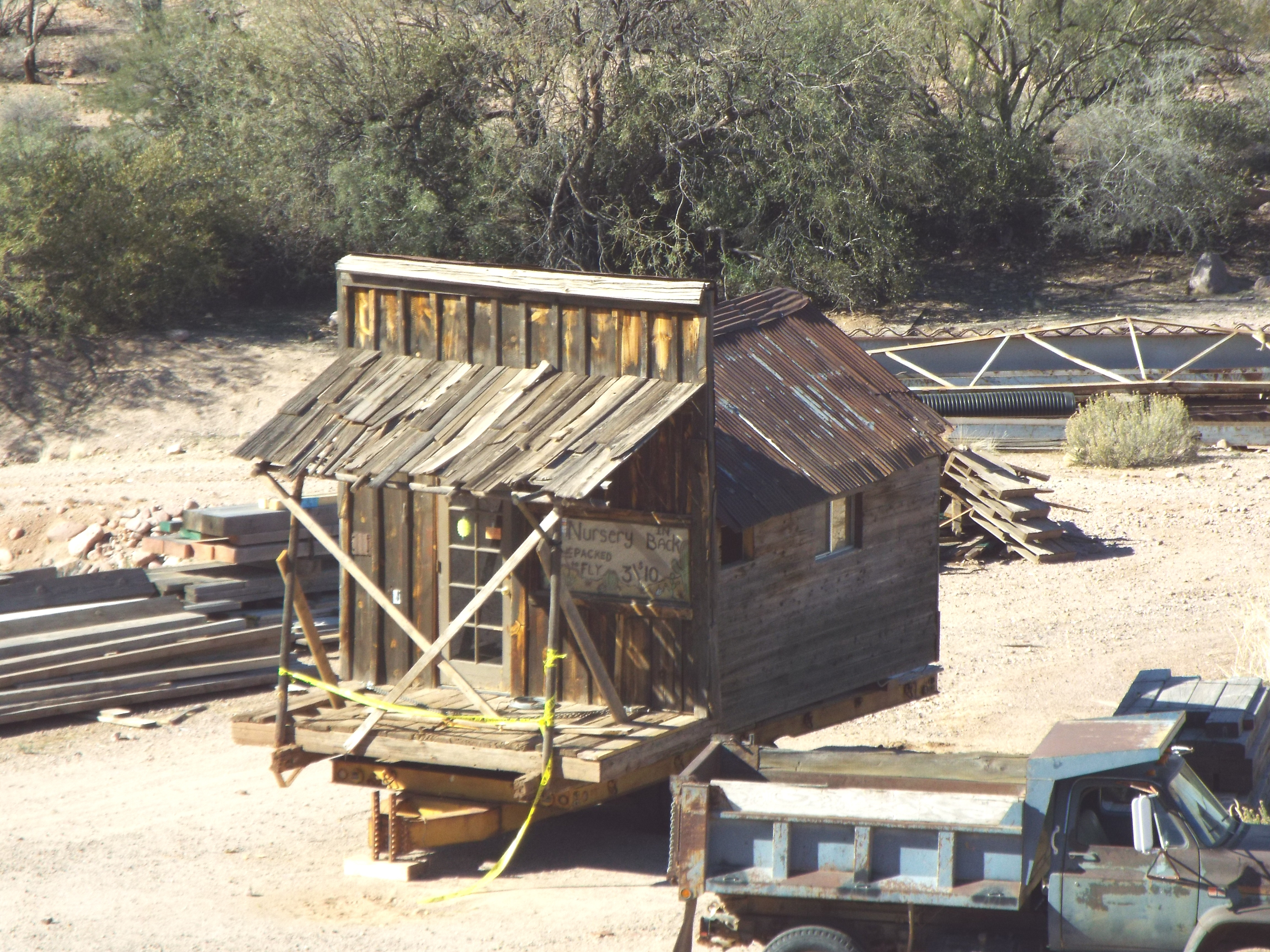
Old Hyder building

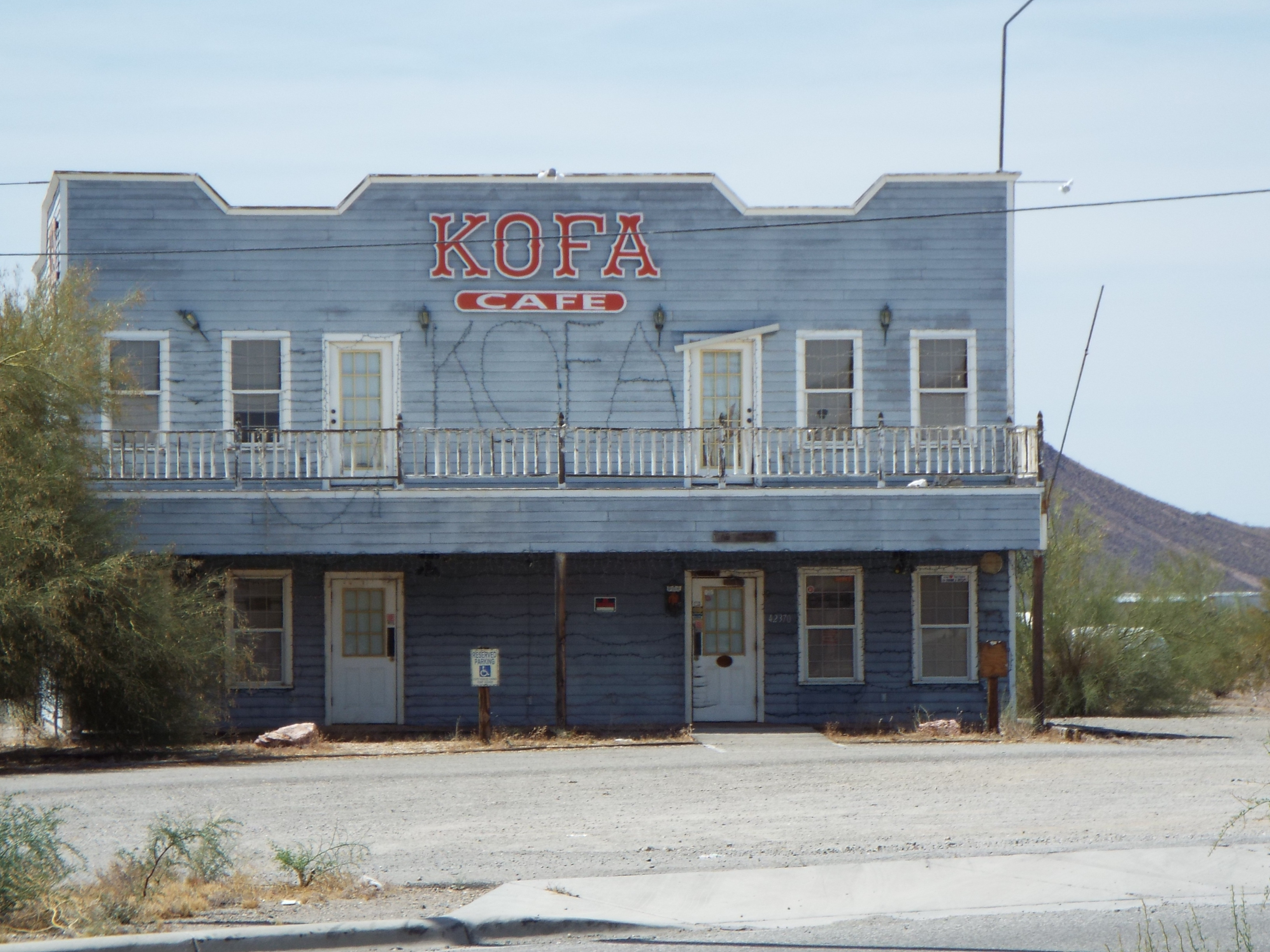
Kofa Hotel, built in 1904

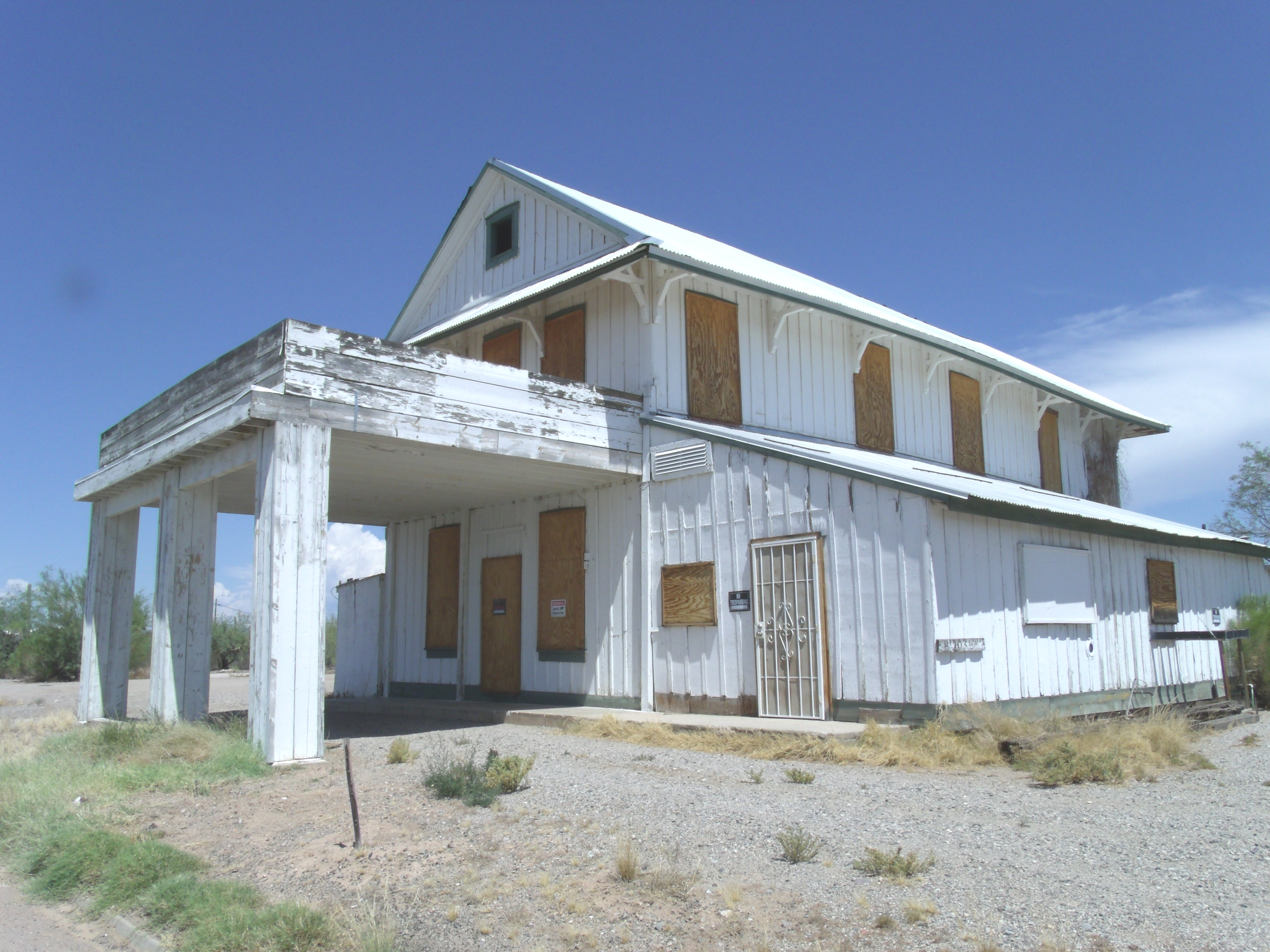
The Morristown Hotel/Store, built in 1899

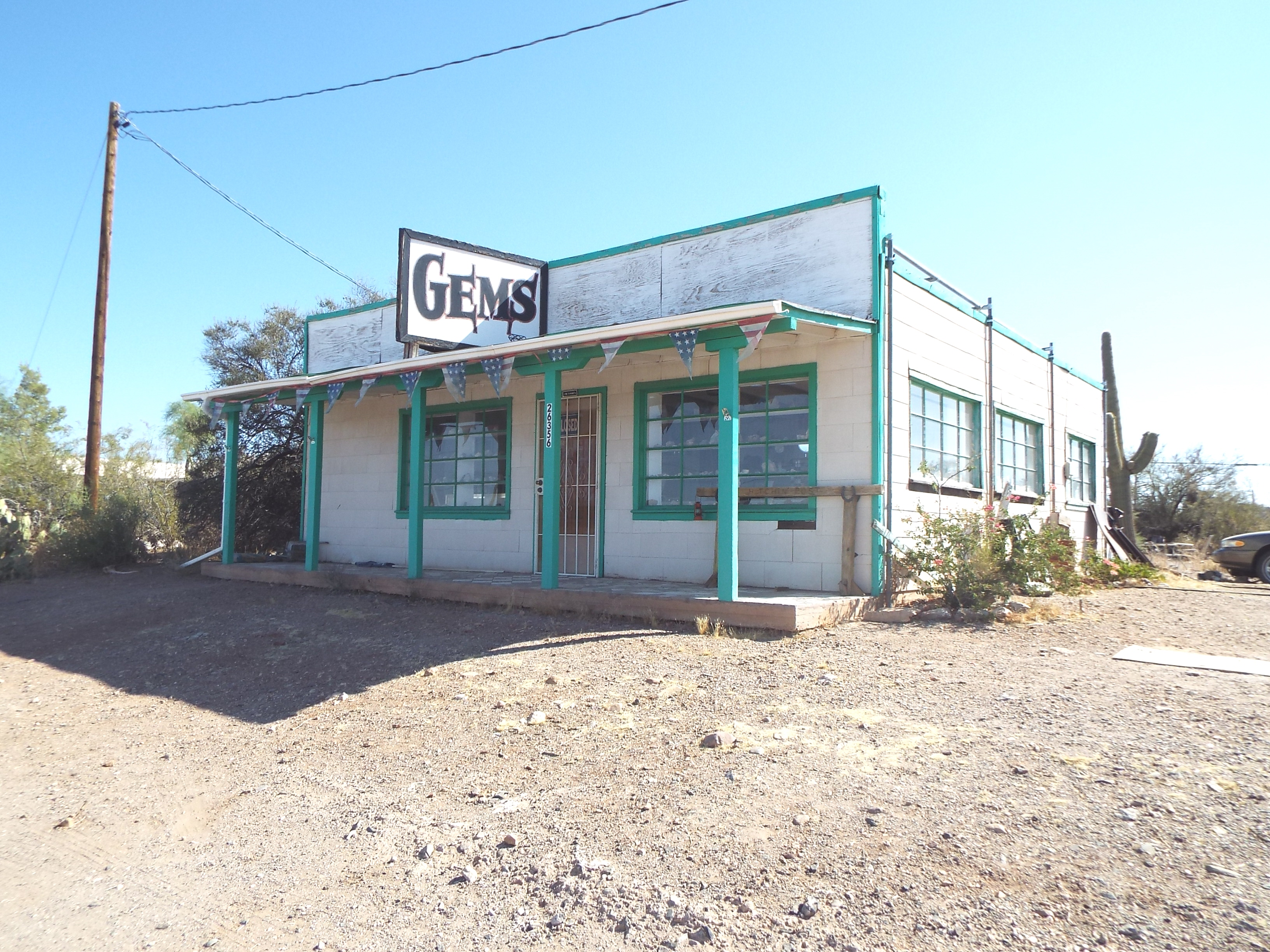
Morristown commercial building, built in 1920

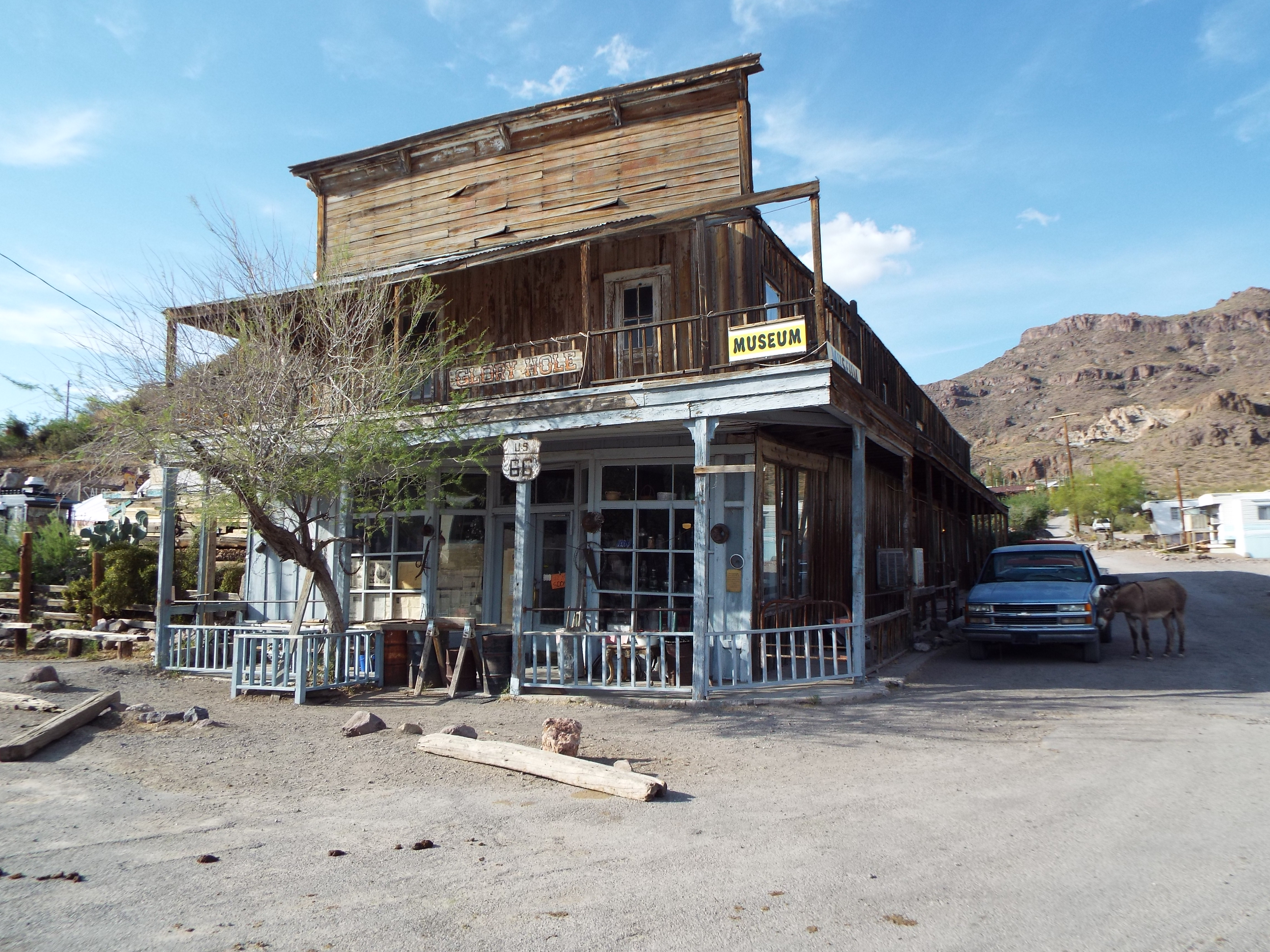
Oatman Drug Company Building, built in 1915 and listed on the NRHP

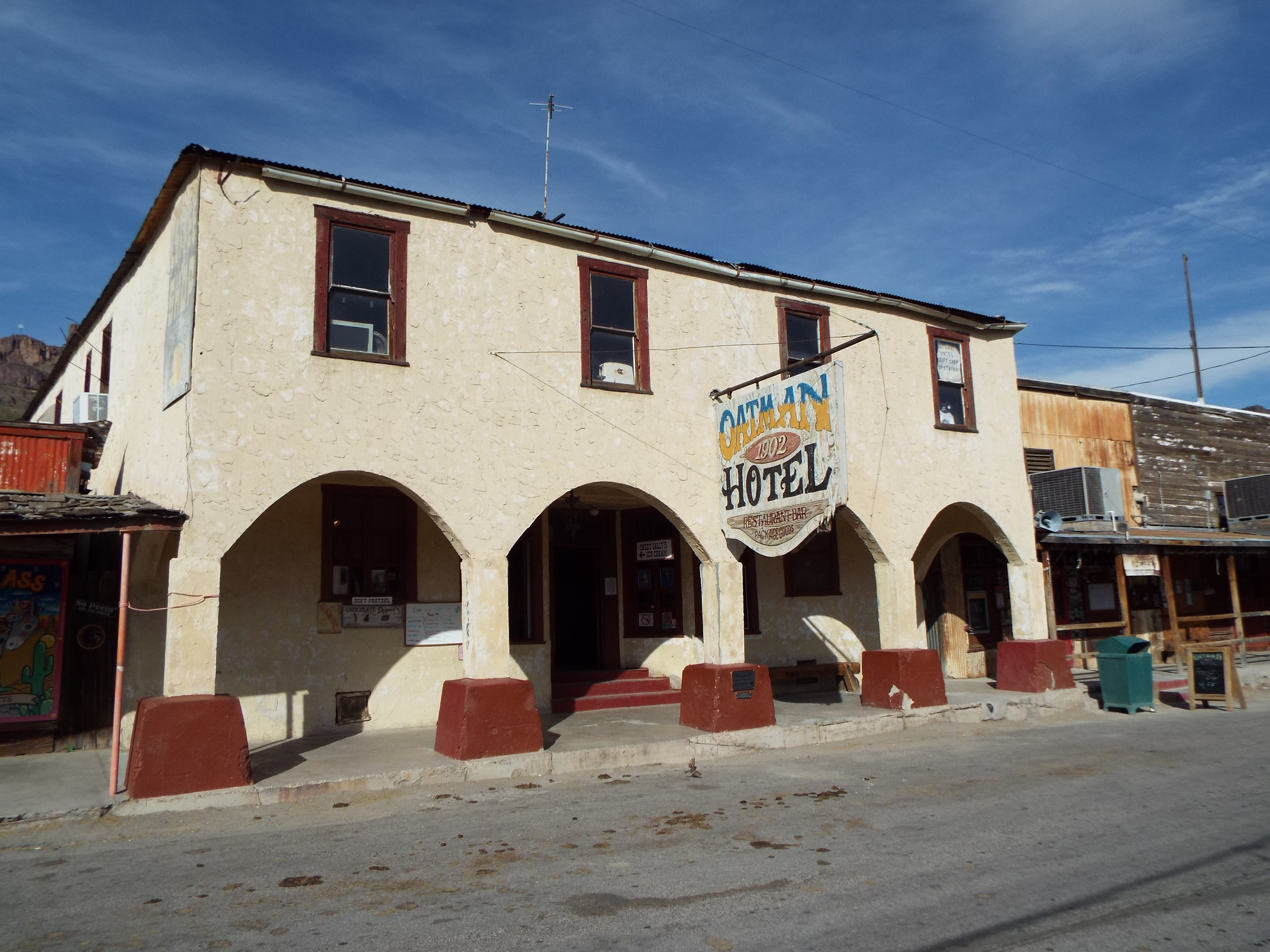
Oatman Hotel, originally the Durlin Hotel, built in 1902

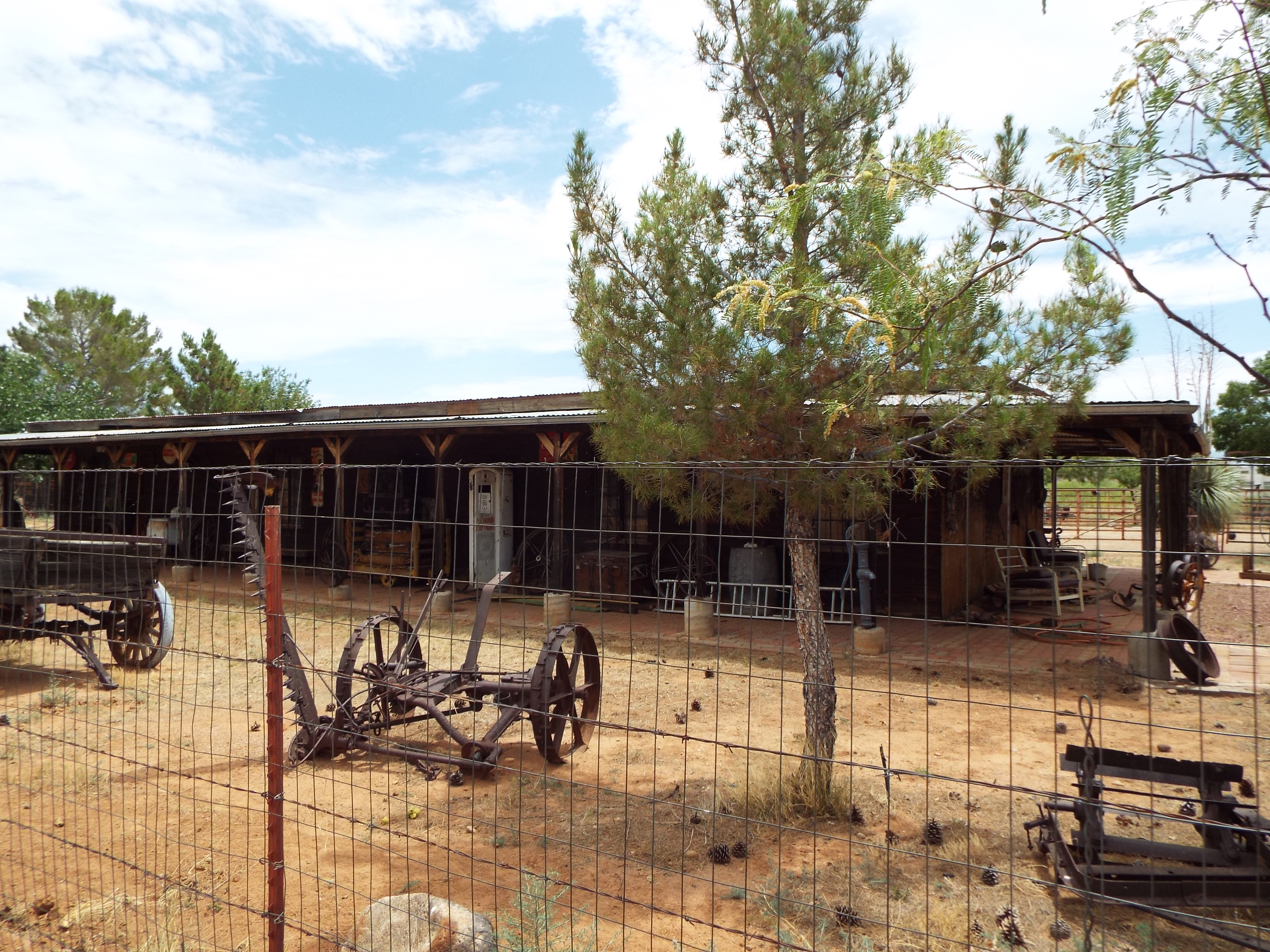
Old ranch house in Pearce

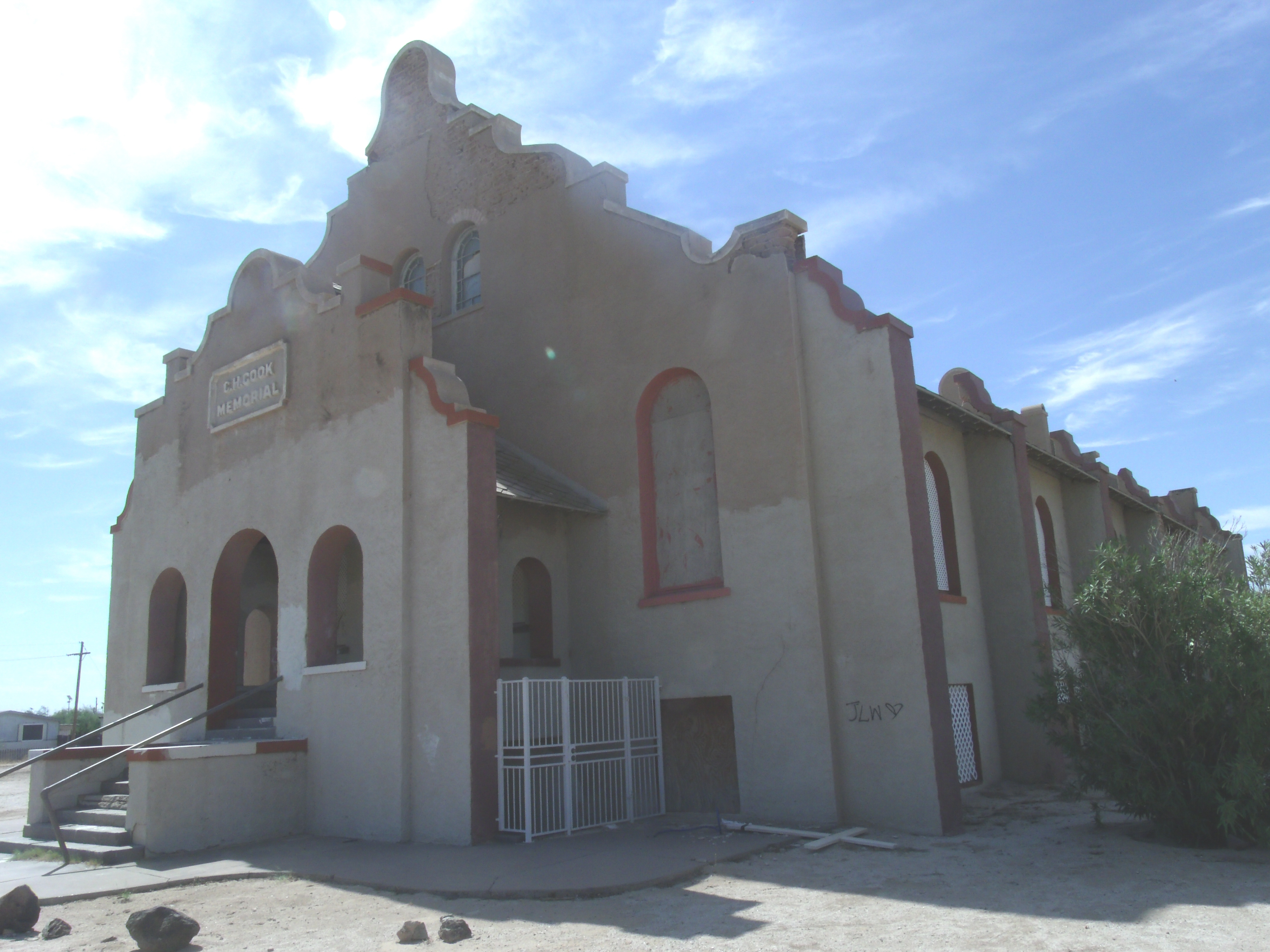
Side view of the C.H. Cook Memorial Church, a historic Sacaton church

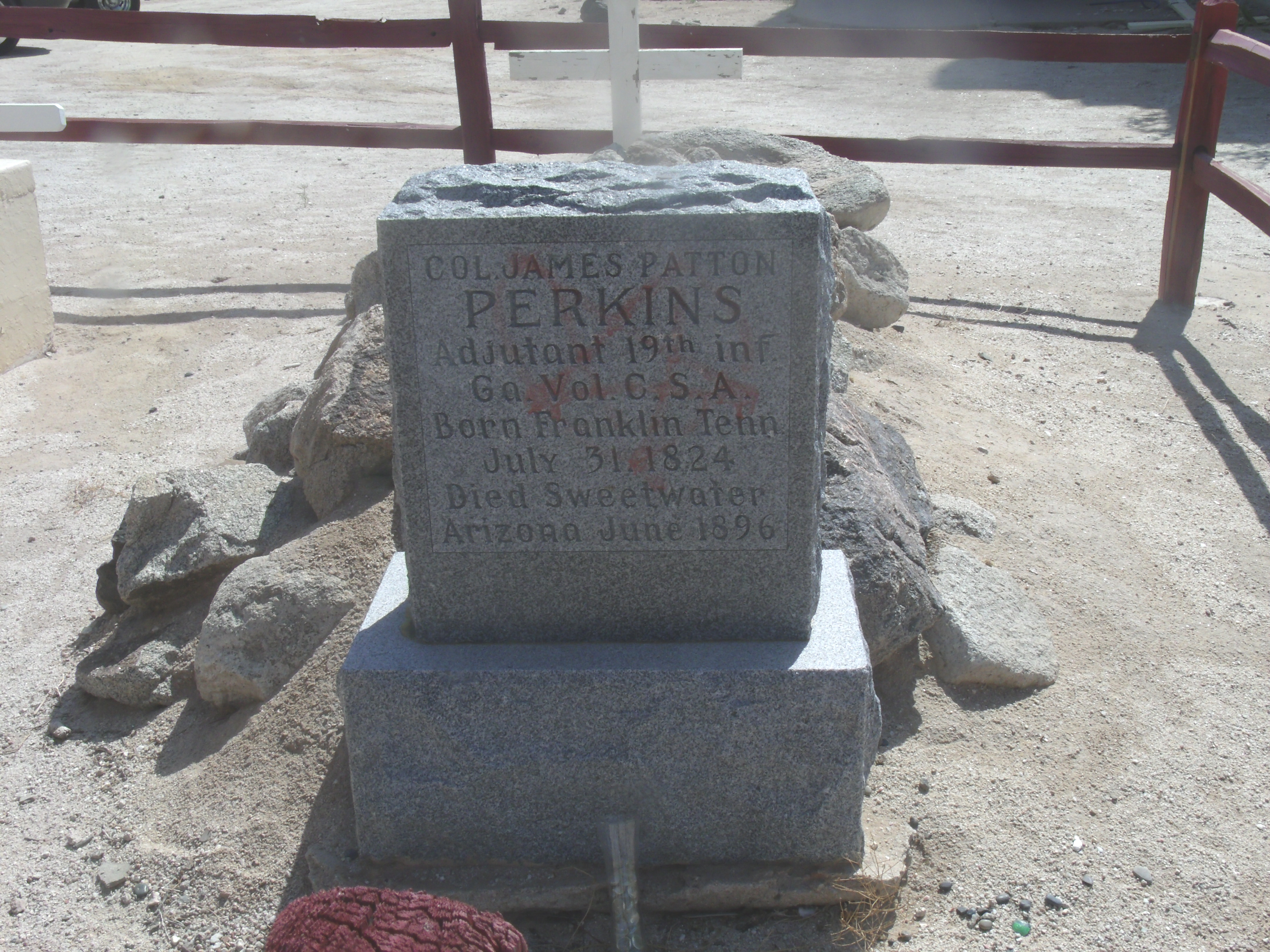
The grave of American Civil War and Confederate Veteran Colonel James Patton Perkins in the C.H. Cook Memorial Church Cemetery in Sacaton

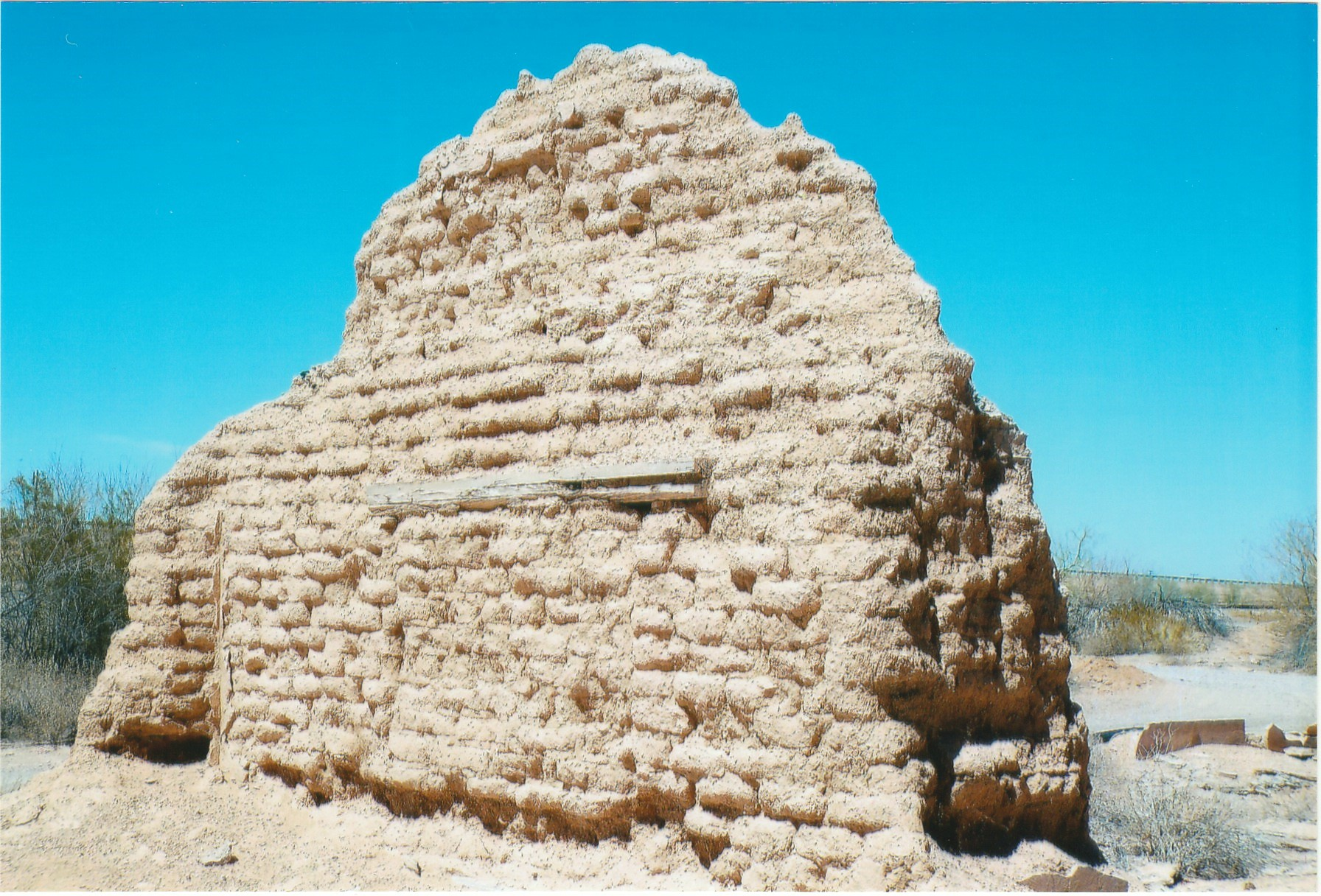
Ruins of the 1895 Sentinel train depot

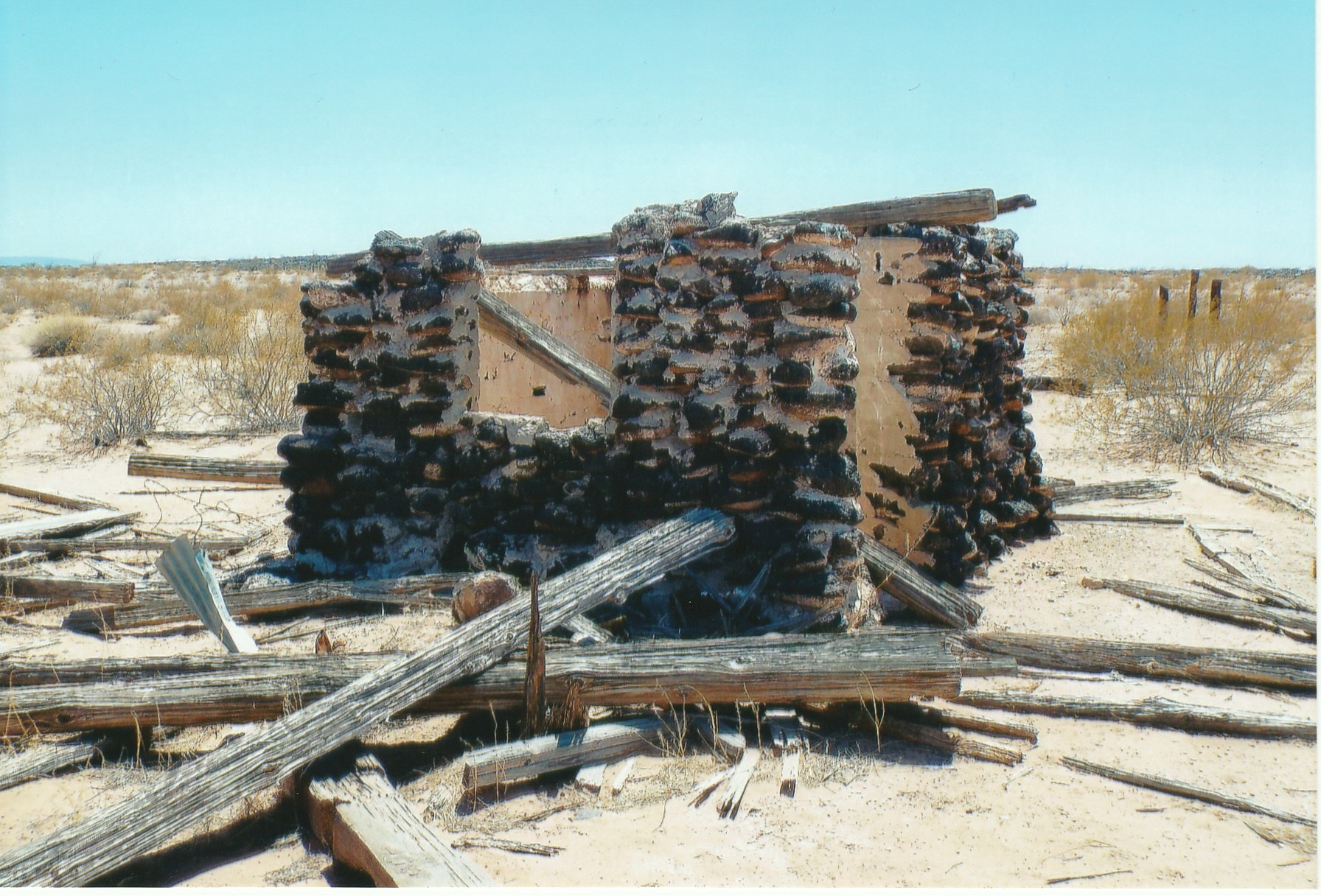
1890 ranch house in Sentinel

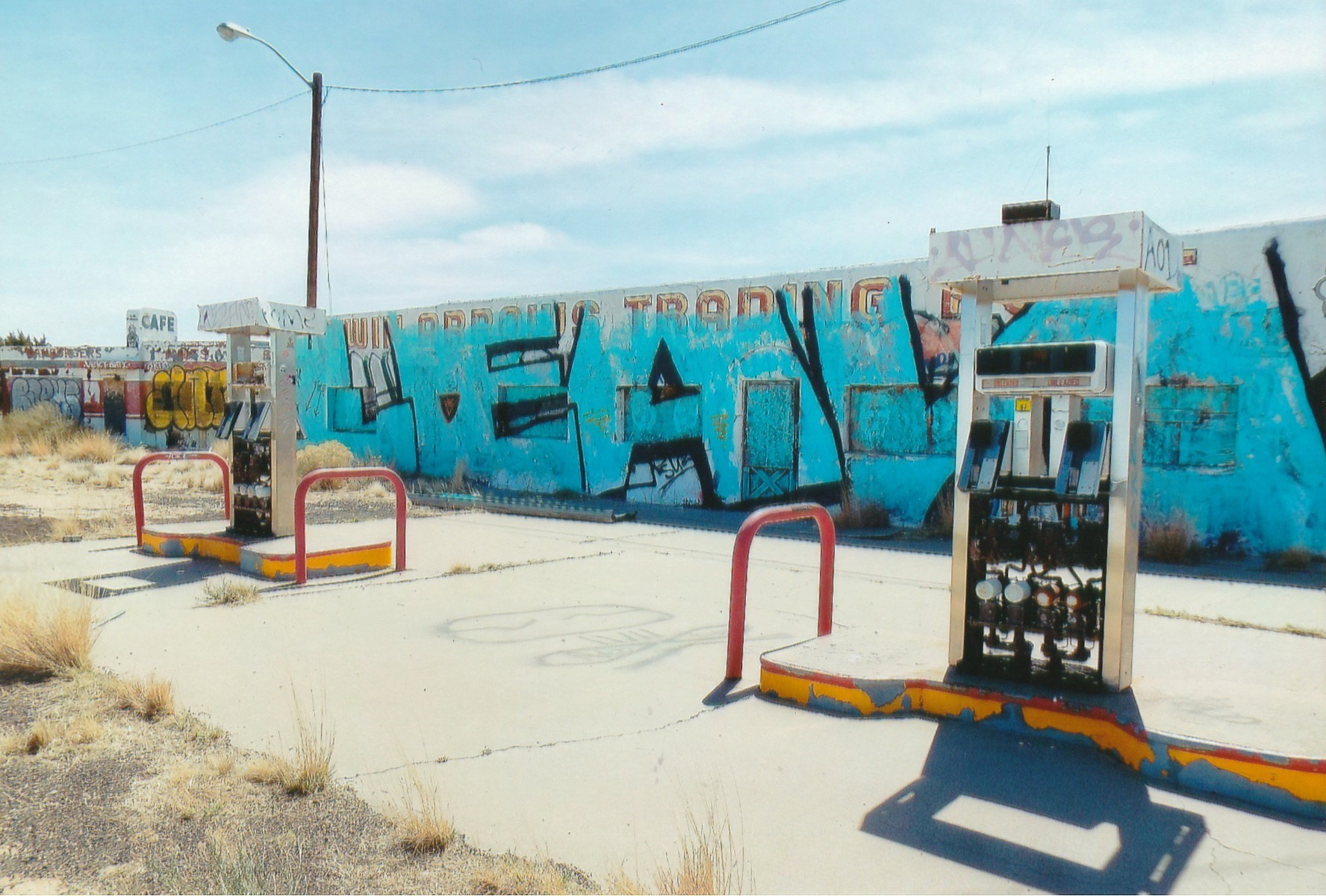
Abandoned Twin Arrows trading post, now within the boundaries of Winslow

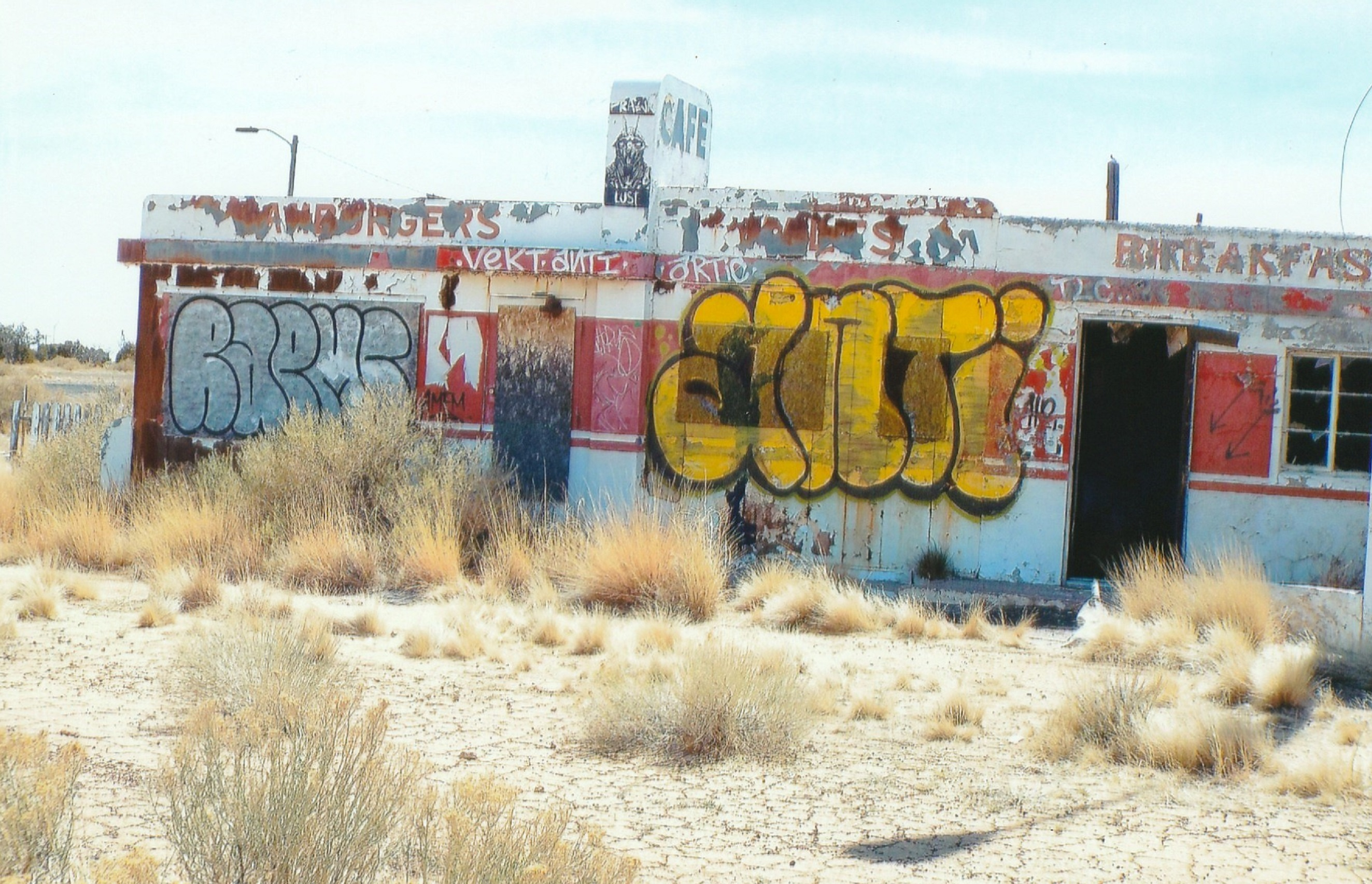
Abandoned cafeteria in Twin Arrows

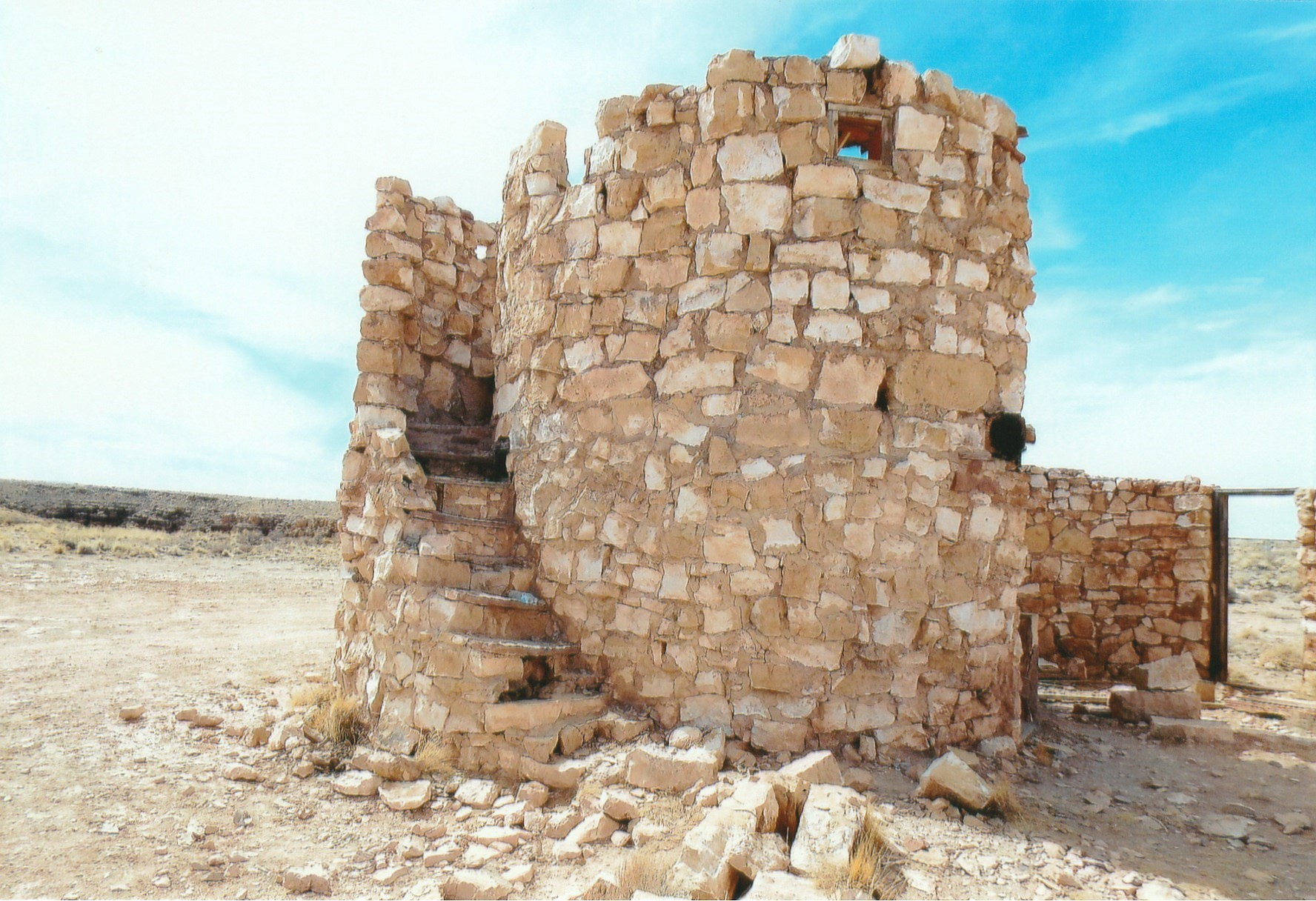
Round stone house/tower ruins in Two Guns, now within the boundaries of Winslow

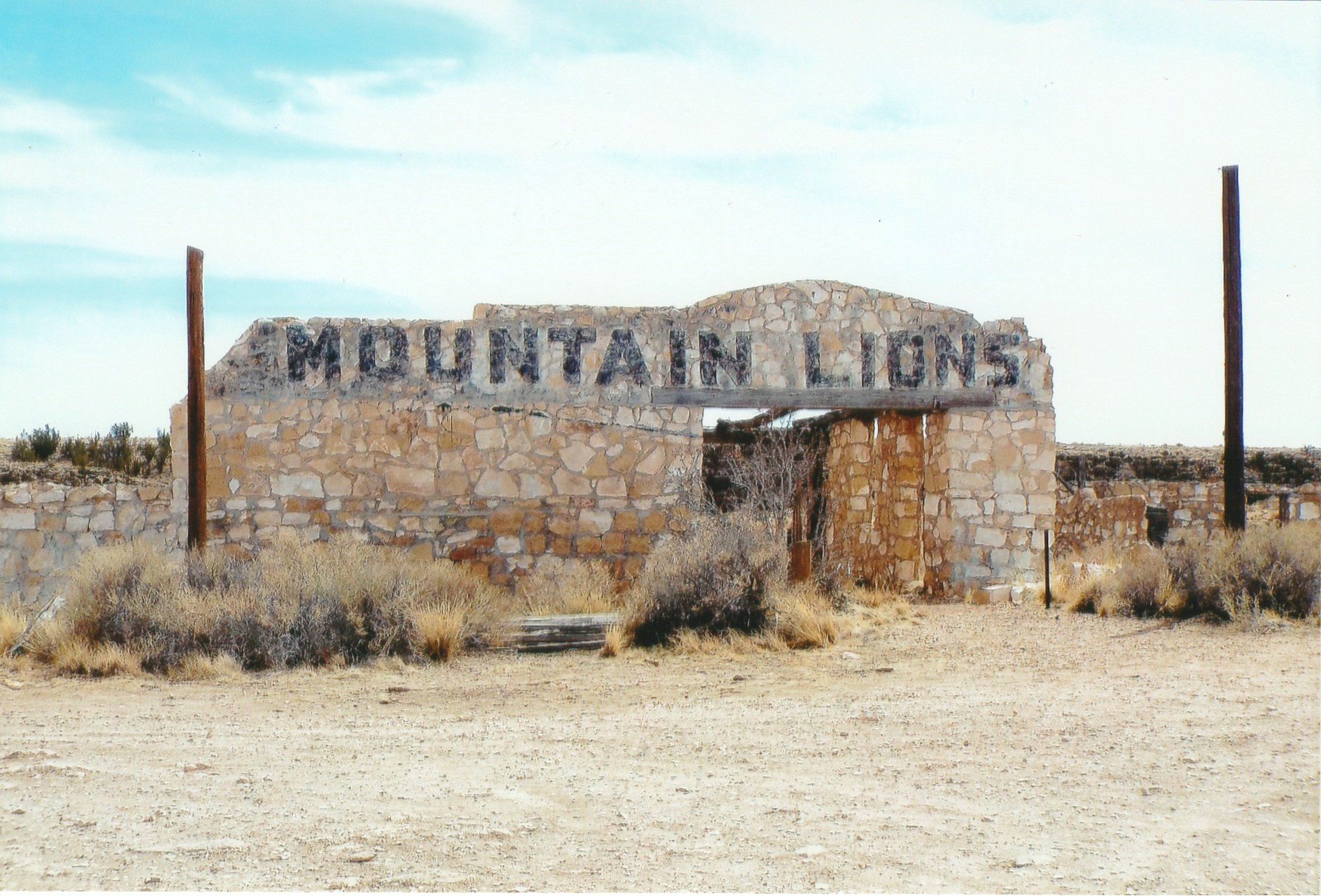
Abandoned zoo building in Two Guns

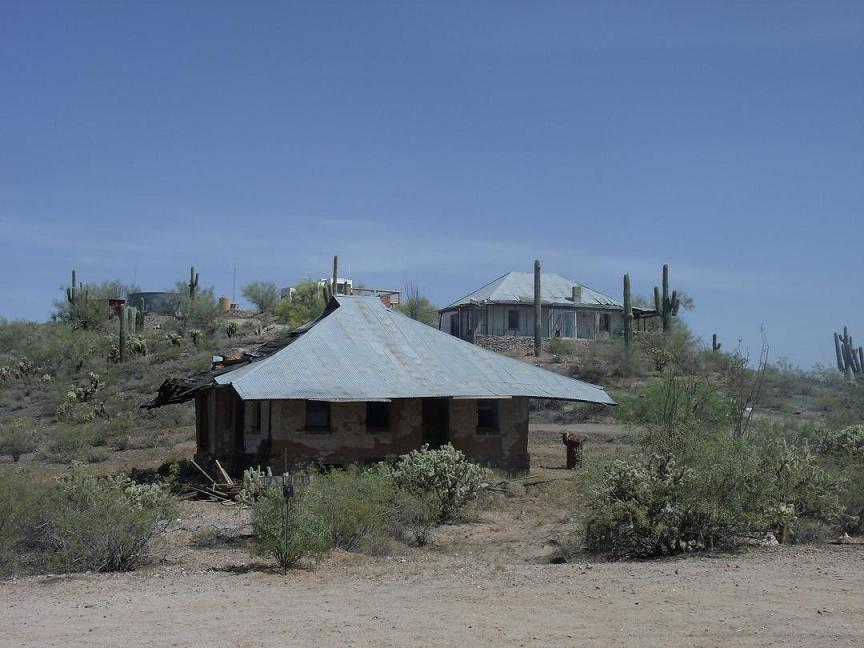
Vulture City ghost town houses

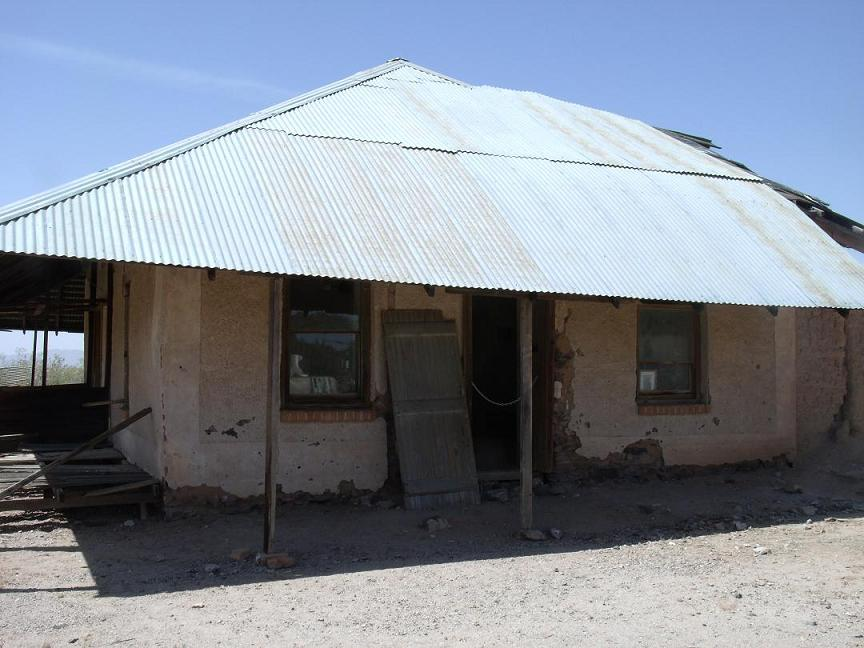
Rita's Brothel in Vulture City

== See also ==
- American Old West
- Arizona Territory
- Copper mining in Arizona
- History of Arizona
- New Mexico Territory
- Silver mining in Arizona
- Tombstone, Arizona
- List of cemeteries in Arizona
