= Big Bug =

Big Bug may refer to:

- Big Bug, Arizona, a ghost town
- "Big Bug", a television episode: see List of Code Lyoko episodes#ep5
- Bigbug, a French comedy film
