= Cedar, Arizona =

Ghost town in Mohave County, Arizona

- Ghost town
- Location within Arizona Location within the United States
- Coordinates: 34°46′43″N 113°47′40″W
- Country: United States
- State: Arizona
- County: Mohave
- Elevation: 4,459 ft (1,359 m)
- Time zone: UTC-7 (MST (no DST))
- Post Office Opened: September 24, 1895
- Post Office Closed: July 31, 1911

Cedar was a gold, silver and copper mining town in Mohave County, Arizona, United States. It was founded circa 1875 on the eastern slope of the Hualapai Mountains, sixty miles southeast of Kingman. A post office was established on September 24, 1895, and closed on July 31, 1911. In addition to the post office there were two saloons, and a general store with several homes. In 1907 the Cedar Valley Gold & Silver Company along with the Yucca Cyanide Mining & Milling Company reported that approximately 200 people lived in the town, within a decade later the site was abandoned. A half mile area inside Cedar Valley is littered with stone ruins and foundations of the mining buildings.
