= Wolf Hole, Arizona =

- Ghost town
- Location within Arizona Location within the United States
- Coordinates: 36°45′46″N 113°32′58″W
- Country: United States
- State: Arizona
- County: Mohave
- Founded: 1918
- Abandoned: 1927
- Elevation: 5,043 ft (1,537 m)
- Time zone: UTC-7 (MST (no DST))
- Post Office opened: 1918
- Post Office closed: 1927

Wolf Hole is a ghost town in the Arizona Strip region of Mohave County, Arizona, United States. It consists only of some foundations and a derelict house.

The author Edward Abbey sometimes claimed to be a resident of Wolf Hole.

== Geography ==
Wolf Hole is located at 36°45′46″N 113°32′58″W.

== See also ==
- Mount Trumbull Wilderness
