= Bellevue, Arizona =

Ghost town in Gila County

- Ghost town
- Location within Arizona Location within the United States
- Coordinates: 33°19′55″N 110°56′36″W
- Country: United States
- State: Arizona
- County: Gila
- Founded: c. 1906
- Abandoned: c. 1927
- Elevation: 4,690 ft (1,430 m)
- Time zone: UTC-7 (MST (no DST))
- Post Office Opened: July 30, 1906
- Post Office Closed: April 7, 1927

Bellevue is a ghost town in Gila County, Arizona, five miles (8.1 km) southwest of Miami.

== History ==
The settlement was founded as a mining camp around 1906 when a post office was established. The name of the founder is unknown though the town was built to harbor the Gibson Cooper Mine. The Bellevue-Miami Stagecoach company had a stage there. A boarding house, general store and the post office were among many houses. The population got as high 300 before 1927 when the post office closed and the settlement became a ghost town. As of today, the concrete Gibson Cooper mill still stands, along with metal mining equipment. Piles of ore can be found, as of 2021 it has been destroyed because of the telegraph fire.

Bellevue's population was 123 in 1920.
