= Catoctin, Arizona =

Ghost town in Yavapai County

Coordinates: 34°25′32″N 112°31′50″W

- Ghost town
- Interactive map of Catoctin, Arizona
- Country: United States
- State: Arizona
- County: Yavapai
- Time zone: MST (no DST)
- Post Office Opened: December 29, 1902
- Post Office Closed: July 15, 1920

Catoctin in Yavapai County, Arizona, United States, was a small gold mining camp. The camp was established circa 1902 and received a post office on December 29 of the same year. It is located on upper Hassayampa River, sixteen miles southeast of Prescott. Only a handful of mining buildings and homes were constructed and on average the town was home to about twenty people. The Catoctin and Climax mines were nearby. On July 15, 1920, the post office was closed.
