= Fortuna, Arizona =

Ghost town in Yuma County

Coordinates: 32°41′26″N 114°27′11″W

Fortuna is a ghost town in Yuma County in the U.S. state of Arizona. It was located on the Southern Pacific's Sunset Route.

Fortuna was a mining town named for the Fortuna Mine or La Fortuna Mine in the Gila Mountains, discovered about 1893 by Charles Thomas, William Holbert, and others, in 1893 in Arizona Territory. It had its own post office from September 1896 that was discontinued in November 30, 1904 being replaced by Blaisdell, Arizona.

== See also ==
- List of ghost towns in Arizona
