= Geronimo, Arizona =

Populated place in Graham County, Arizona

- Populated place
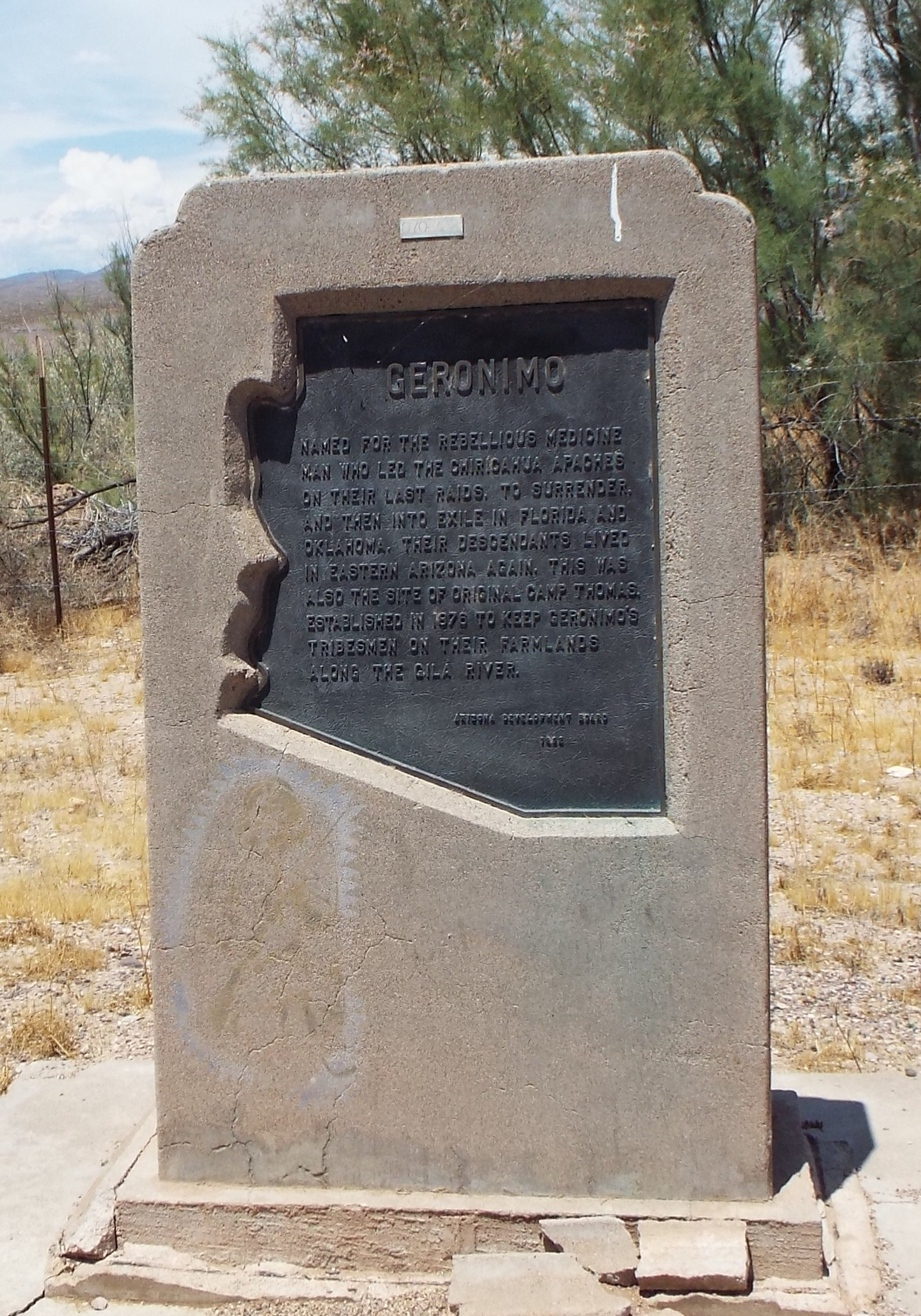
- Historic Geronimo Town marker

- Location within the state of Arizona Geronimo (the United States)
- Coordinates: 33°04′37″N 110°02′06″W
- Country: United States
- State: Arizona
- County: Graham
- Elevation: 2,720 ft (830 m)
- Time zone: UTC-7 (Mountain (MST))
  - Summer (DST): UTC-7 (MST)
- Area code: 928
- FIPS code: 04-26770
- GNIS feature ID: 24428

Geronimo is a populated place located on Highway 70 between Bylas and Fort Thomas, west of Safford in Graham County, Arizona, United States. Geronimo lies at an elevation of 2,723 feet (830 m).

== History ==
Geronimo was named after the famous Apache chief Goyaalé, better known as Geronimo. Camp Thomas, the U. S. Cavalry began its management of the Apache Indian Reservation along the Gila River, was originally located here in 1876. The camp was later moved east to what is now Fort Thomas. Geronimo was once a stop on the Arizona Eastern Railway and had an operating US Post Office from April 30, 1896, until May 31, 1956.
