= Big Bug, Arizona =

Ghost town in Yavapai County, Arizona

- Ghost town
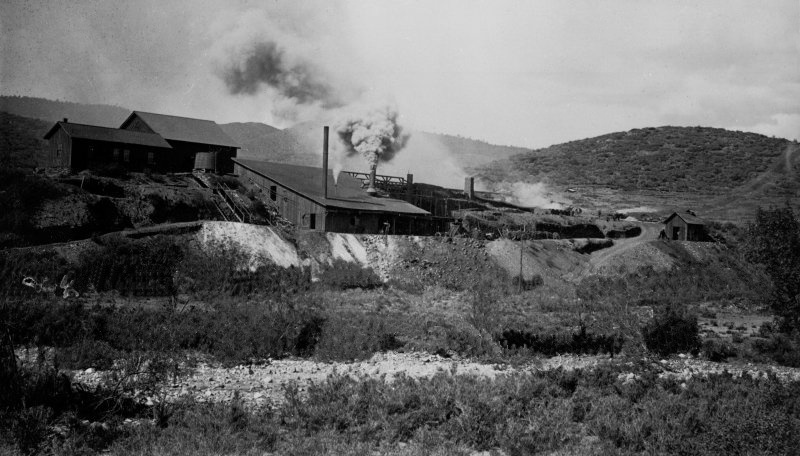
- The mining smelters in Big Bug, Arizona, circa 1900

- Location within Arizona Location within the United States
- Coordinates: 34°18′54″N 112°04′00″W
- Country: United States
- State: Arizona
- County: Yavapai
- Established: 1862
- Abandoned: circa 1910
- Named for: Big Bug Creek
- Elevation: 3,461 ft (1,055 m)
- Time zone: UTC-7 (MST (no DST))
- Post Office Opened: March 31, 1879
- Post Office Closed: March 31, 1910

Big Bug is a ghost town in Yavapai County, Arizona, United States. The former settlement is located twelve miles southeast of Prescott and was established in 1862.

== History ==
Big Bug has a long history of frontier life. The town was founded by Theodore Boggs during the American Civil War. Boggs' father was the former governor of Missouri, Lilburn Boggs, who helped drive the Mormons out during the Missouri Mormon War. When he was ten years old, he traveled west to California, accompanied partway by the famous Donner Party. His mother was a granddaughter of the pioneer Daniel Boone.

In 1862, Boggs left California for Arizona and settled along Big Bug Creek and began working a mining claim. A mine was built with a few other buildings of necessity. A town sprang up with an average population of 100. The actual claim where the minerals were mined was a few minutes walk outside of town. In the early years only four men mined the claim, Theodore Boggs and three others.

Big Bug's population was 115 in 1890.

The town had only been established a month before natives discovered the place; they attacked soon after. A post office was established in 1879 and remained in service until 1910. For a while the post office was actually Theodore Boggs' house. The assistant postmistress, Miss Dawson, delivered the mail herself on horseback throughout the town and surroundings. Gradually the town died when the mines shut down.

In the 1930s, small placer miners returned to Big Bug Creek. The many large boulders in the creek had prevented the use of heavy machinery in the earlier mining, so considerable gold remained. In 1932, some 60 amateur miners were working there, some recovering as much as $300 a week, including some nuggets.

The Big Bug placers produced a recorded 17,000 troy ounces (528.8 kg) of gold; the total production was around 50,000 ounces (1,417.5 kg), mostly from dredging in the 1930s and 1940s. Big Bug Creek still has some indication of early mining activities, but little if anything remains of the town as of 2010.

=== Battle of Big Bug ===
The Battle of Big Bug was a skirmish during the Apache Wars involving Theodore Boggs and three other miners. It occurred when Apaches attacked the mine one night. Boggs and the three others were sleeping when one awoke to the sound of their crying dog. The miner peered out and witnessed the dog, pierced with an arrow in his side. The Apaches then attempted to crush the dugout with all four of the white men inside. Big boulders were rolled down onto the structure from the mountain above. Two of the miners held a bed frame over their heads to keep the roof from caving in.

The Apaches came close and Boggs with the remaining miner manned their muskets. When the Apaches came close enough, the two stuck their rifles outside a few little portholes just dug and then they fired. Two of the Apaches were killed immediately and dropped to the ground. Caught off guard, the Apaches hastily picked up their shot fellow warriors and retreated up the mountain side. Once at the top, the Apaches cremated their dead in full view of Boggs and the others. They then continued a withdrawal from the area. Later the four went back to the town unharmed and told the alarmed residents what had happened.

== See also ==
- Navajo Wars
