= Lucky Jim Camp =

Abandoned mining camp in Nevada, US

Coordinates: 35°42′08″N 114°48′12″W

Lucky Jim Camp, sometimes called Lucky Camp, is a ghost town site in Clark County, Nevada. It was within New Mexico Territory when founded in 1862.

It was a mining camp in El Dorado Canyon in the Colorado Mining District in the 1860s. Its site lies on the north side of the canyon, south of the Techatticup Mine, at an elevation of 2,444 feet (745 m) and above the mouth of January Wash at its confluence with El Dorado Canyon.

== History ==
How Lucky Jim Camp was named is unknown.

Lucky Jim Camp was the home of miners sympathetic to the Confederate cause during the American Civil War. A one mile (1.6 km) up the canyon, above Huse Spring, was a camp with Union sympathies called Buster Falls.

El Dorado City with its stamp mill, established in late 1863, was located just a short distance down the same side of the canyon as the older Lucky Jim Camp, and may have supplanted it by the end of the war or shortly thereafter, when the mines had a period of idleness.

== Today ==
The site of Lucky Jim Camp appears barren of any trace of ruins viewed by satellite photos.
