= Buster Falls, Nevada =

Mining camp in El Dorado Canyon (founded 1862)

Coordinates: 35°42′10″N 114°49′13″W

Buster Falls, now a ghost town, was a mining camp in El Dorado Canyon above Huse Spring and the Techatticup Mine in the Colorado Mining District during the time of the American Civil War. The source of the name of the camp is unknown. Its site lay along the canyon a mile above the site of Lucky Jim Camp. The site would be just above the El Dorado Canyon's confluence with Copper Canyon.

== History ==
Founded in 1862, during the time of the American Civil War, Buster Falls was the home of miners sympathetic to the Union cause. A mile down the canyon at the foot of the Techatticup Mine, lay Lucky Jim Camp, the home of miners sympathetic to the Confederate cause.

== Site today ==
This site appears to be currently occupied by buildings 0.4 miles southwest of the center of Nelson, Nevada on Nevada State Route 165.
