= Louisville, Nevada =

Ghost town in Clark County, NV, US

- Ghost town
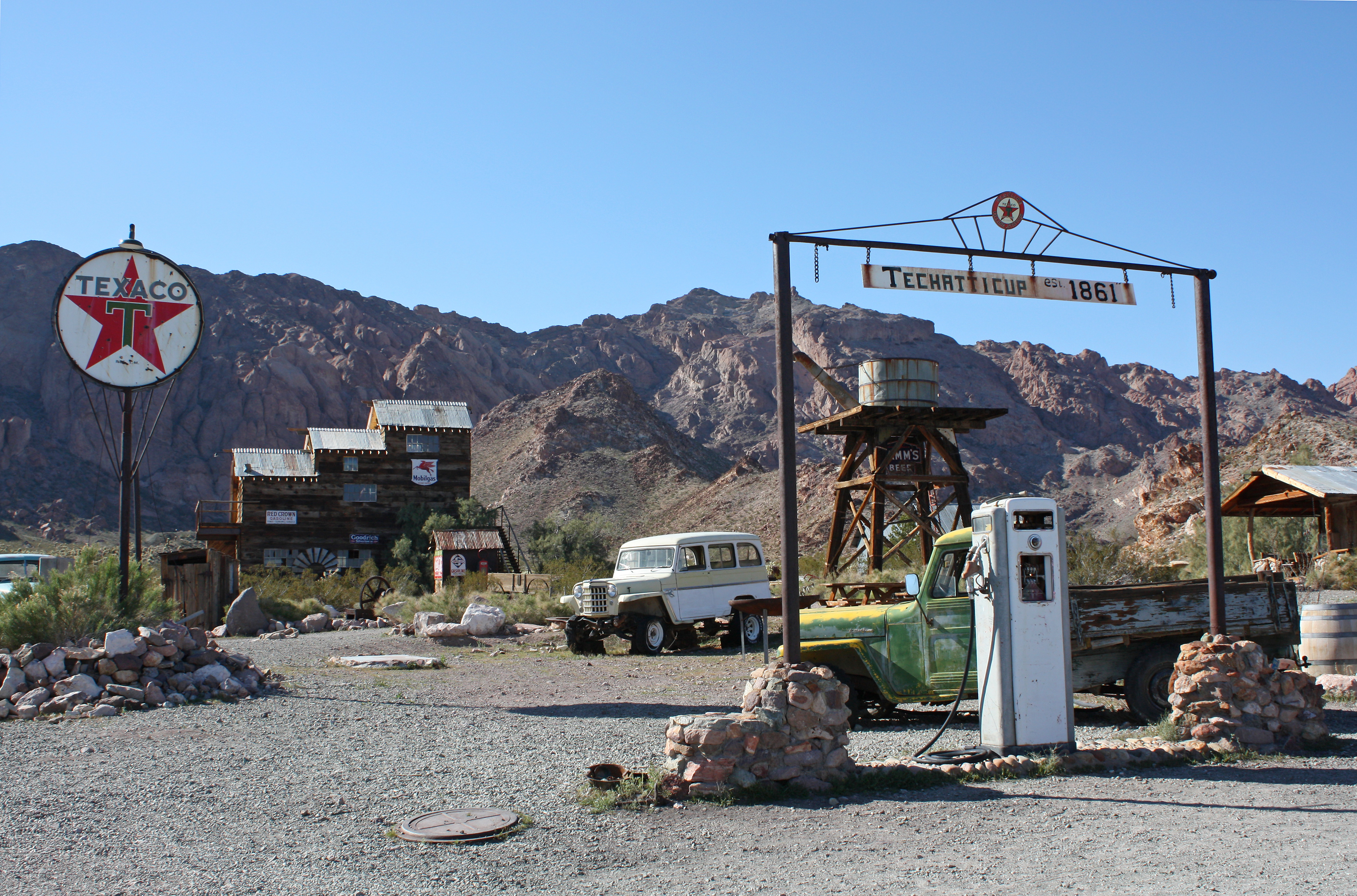
- The nearby Techatticup Mine, photographed in 2009
- Etymology: Possibly named after Nat S. Lewis
- Location within Nevada
- Coordinates: 35°42′42″N 114°48′16″W
- Country: United States
- State: Nevada
- County: Clark
- Established: c. 1861
- GNIS feature ID: 863226

Louisville was a mining camp located in El Dorado Canyon, near the Techatticup Mine in the Eldorado Mining District, then part of New Mexico Territory. The settlement is now a ghost town. The camp is believed to have been named after Nat S. Lewis, who served as superintendent of the Techatticup Mine and as a physician at the camp during the 1860s.

== History ==
=== Establishment ===
Louisville developed during the early 1860s in El Dorado Canyon, following the discovery of valuable gold and silver deposits in the region. News of the discoveries attracted prospectors to the newly established Colorado Mining District. Louisville was among several settlements founded in the canyon, alongside Alturas, San Juan, and Colorado City Louisville and Alturas were situated approximately halfway down the canyon, near the Techatticup Mine.

The early mining settlements consisted of stone cabins and numerous tents, with few established amenities. The isolated location of the canyon made the transportation of supplies and equipment difficult, while mining operations attracted increasing numbers of prospectors and investors.
