= Nevada State Route 60 =

Two highways in the U.S. state of Nevada have been signed as Route 60:

- Nevada State Route 60 (1937)
- Nevada State Route 60 (1940s), which existed until the 1970s renumbering
