= List of historic structures in Oatman, Arizona =

- Town
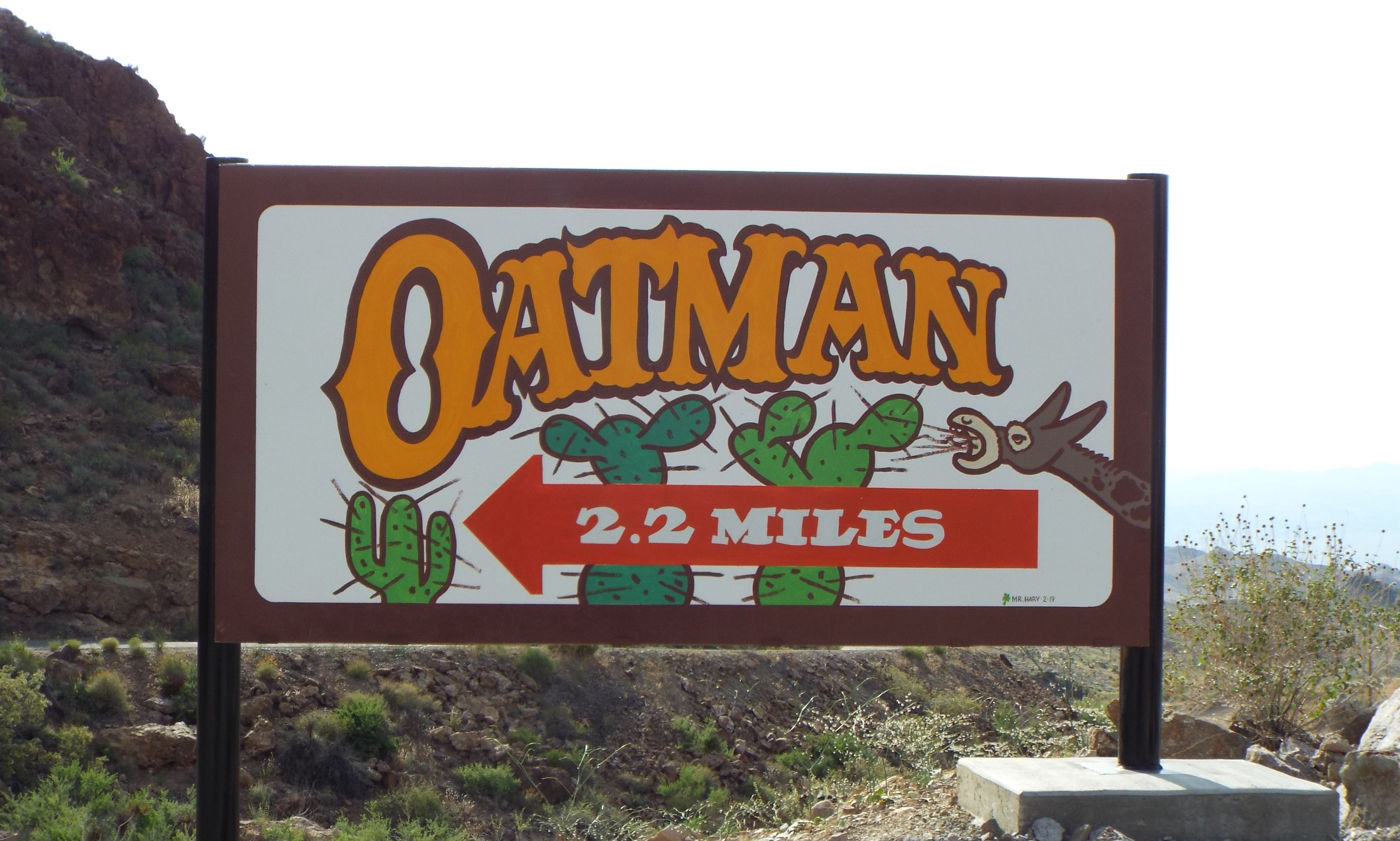
- Oatman Highway/Old US 66 to Oatman

- Location of Oatman in Mohave County, Arizona.
- Coordinates: 35°01′35″N 114°23′01″W

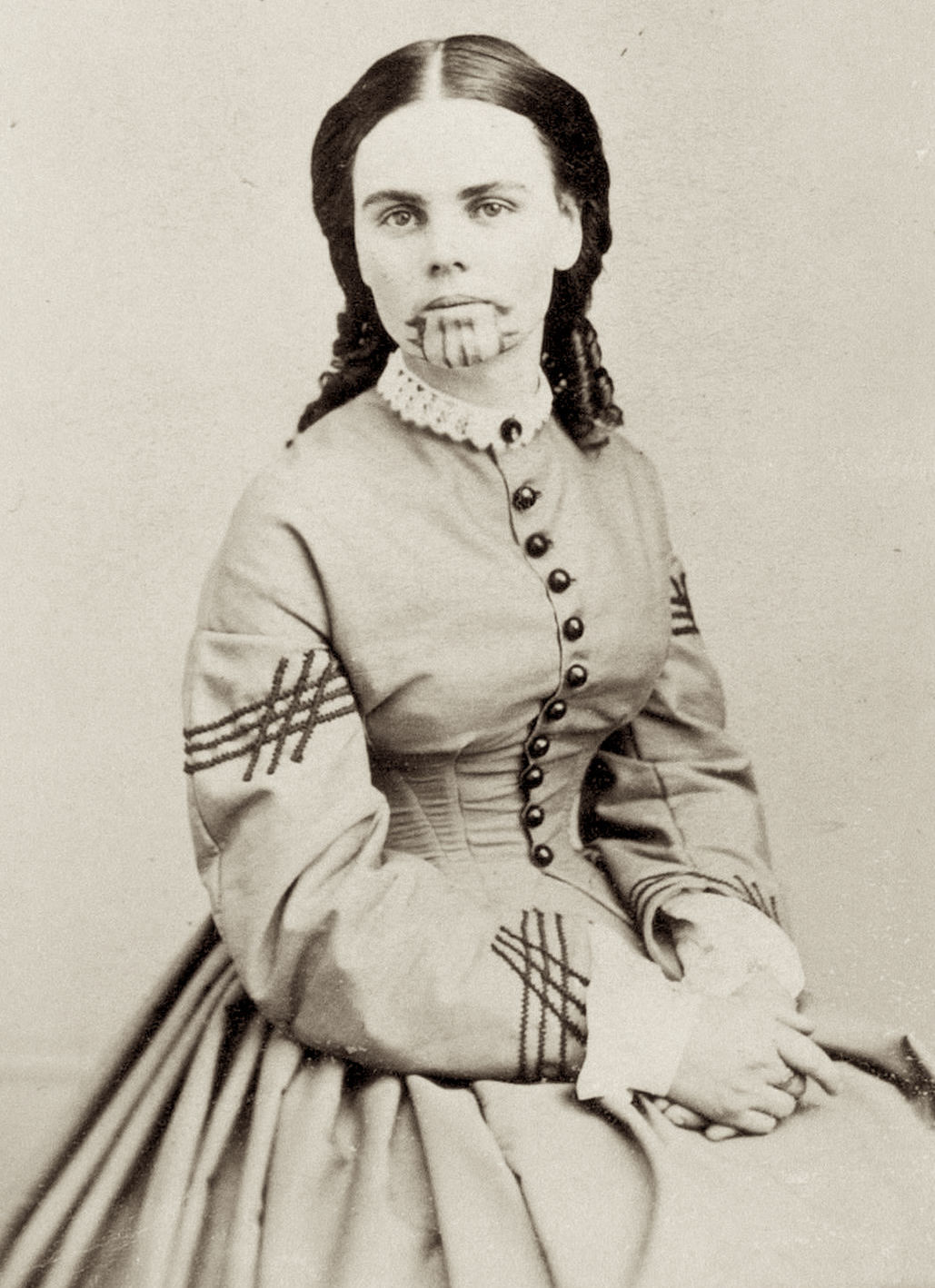
Olive Oatman

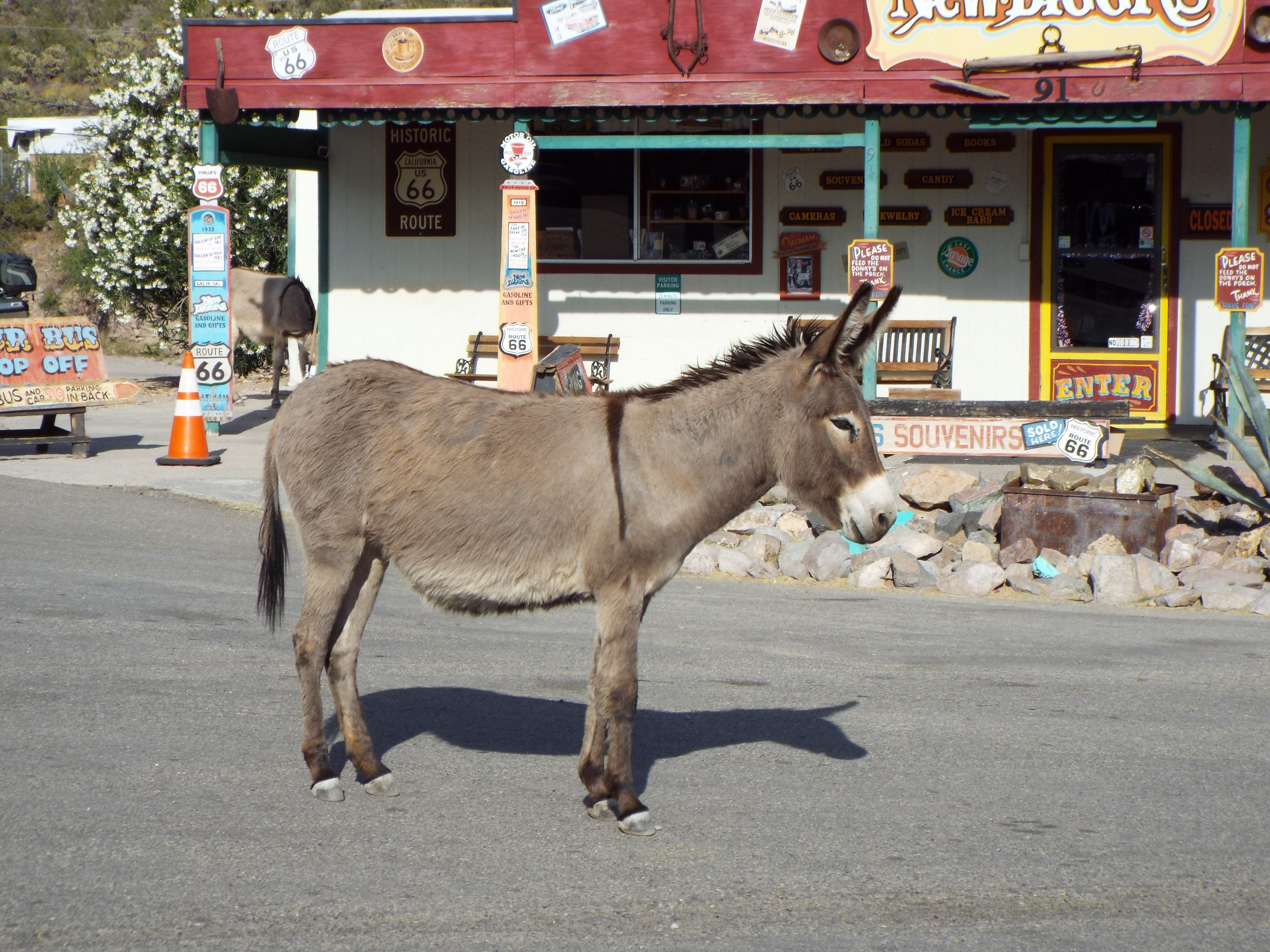
A wild Burro in Oatman

This is a list with images of some of the structures in the historic mining town of Oatman, Arizona which is located in the Black Mountains of Mohave County. Two of the structures are listed in the National Register of Historic Places. Also, included is the gas station of Cool Springs, which served automobile travelers on the historic Route 66 in the vicinity of Oatman.

== Brief history ==
The Black Mountains of northwest Arizona are an extensive long mountain range. The Hualapai Native-American Tribe inhabited the area. Tensions between the Hualapai people and settlers began with encroachment of Indian lands. Between 1867 and 1869, the Hualapai were at war with the American settlers from the east coast who lived in this area after the death of the prominent Yavapai leader Anasa. The United States Army arrived in the defense of the settlers in what now is known as the Hualapai War. Skirmishing continued for almost two more years in the area after the majority of the Hualapais surrendered due to an outbreak of dysentery and whooping cough in 1869.

=== Vivian tent city ===
John Thomas Moss was a frontiersman and prospector from Utica, New York who learned the languages of many of the tribes in the area. In 1862, he discovered gold in the Black Mountains and staked a claim in what became known as the Moss Mine. In 1863, he went into the Hualapai Mountains and organized the profitable Wauba Yuma Mining District.

Soon after a tent city was established and named "Vivian" nestled in the southern portion of the Black Mountain range. The tent city of Vivian grew as miners and prospectors continued to arrive in the area. Burros, which is the Spanish word for Donkey, were used by the miners to carry essential supplies, including rock and metals in those days. The wild burros, roaming the streets of Oatman today, are the offspring of the burros that were let lose after they became useless to the miners as resources ran out and mines closed.

In 1902, John Durlin built the Drulin Hotel which provided shelter and food to many of the miners in the area. Currently, the hotel, which was renamed in 1960 "Oatman Hotel" is the only historic two-story adobe building in Mohave County. By 1904, the Vivian Mining Company began operations and a Post Office was established. Between 1903 and 1905, the town and mines were served by a narrow gauge rail line. The narrow gauge trail line ran 17 miles to the Colorado River near Needles, California.

=== Oatman ===
In 1909, Vivian was formally named Oatman in honor of Olive Oatman. a young 14-year-old girl whose family was attacked by a small group from a Native American tribe believed to be Tolkepayas (Western Yavapai). All were killed except for three of the children: Lorenzo, age 15 (who was left for dead), Olive, and Mary Ann, age 7, who were taken to be slaves for the Yavapais. Olive and Mary Ann were sold as slaves to the Mohave who tattooed both girls on their chins and arms. Olive survived the ordeal, but her younger sister Mary Ann died while in captivity. Eventually. Olive was released when the Mohaves were told by a messenger that the whites would destroy the Mohaves if they did not release her. The trade items included were blankets and a white horse.

In 1915, another boom was provided to the settlement when two miners struck a gold find. However, in 1921, a fire of huge proportions consumed many of the structures in the town. The townspeople worked hard to rebuild the small town. Five years later the main mining company, United Eastern Mines, shut down operations for good. The town continued to survive due to the travelers who passed through the old U.S. Route 66 which was built in 1920. The town's economy was once again affected when the route became what is now Interstate 40 and was completely bypassed in 1953.

In 1995, the Gold Road Mine was reopened, however the decline of gold prices resulted in its closure in 1998. A renewed interest in the town and travel in Route 66 began with the growth of the nearby gaming town of Laughlin, Nevada. The hotels in Laughlin promotes visits to the town. Oatman is now a tourist attraction.

=== Cool Springs ===
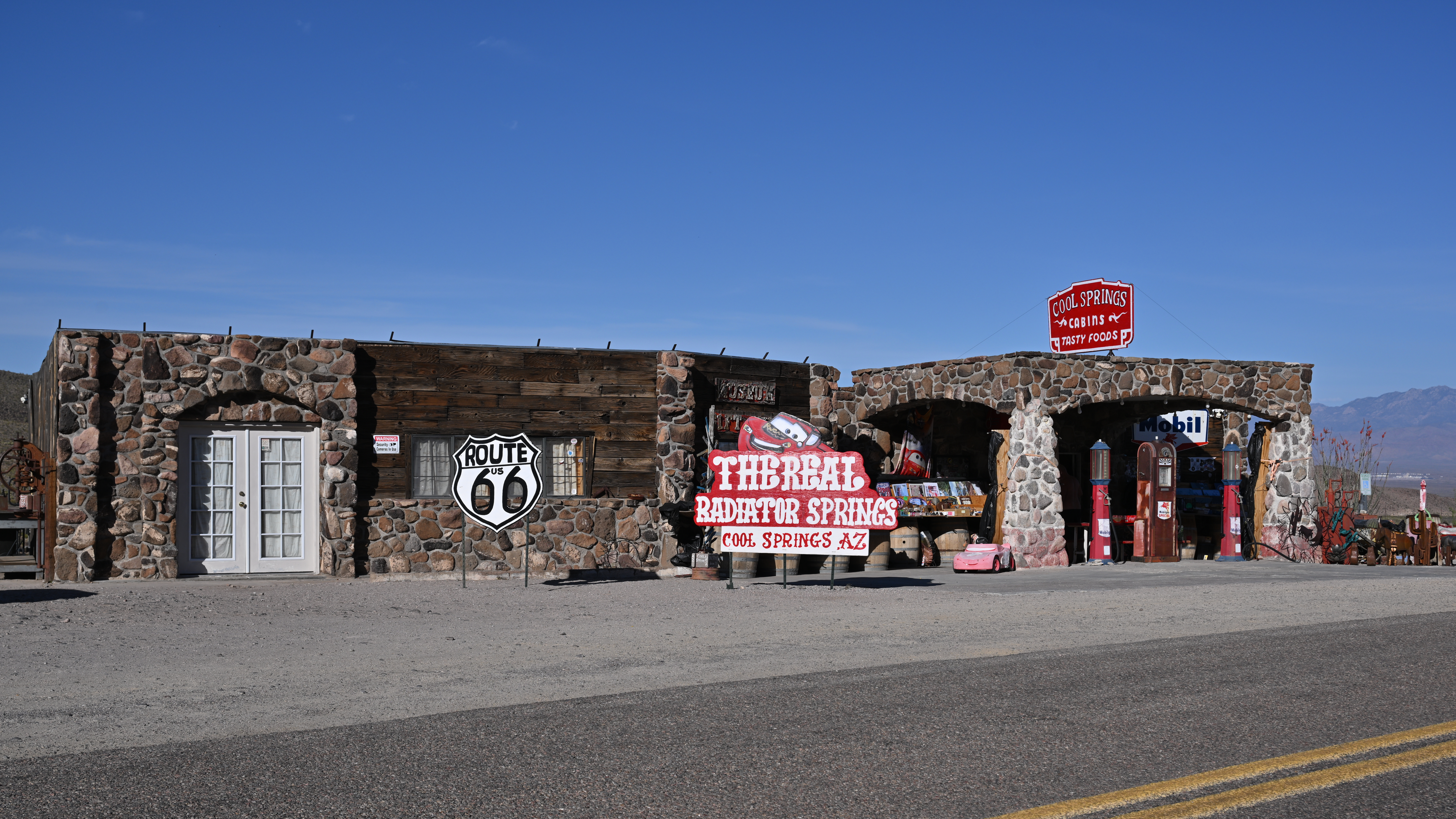
Cool Springs Station

Before reaching Oatman through the historic Route 66, there is a gas station, the Cool Springs camp and service station, which originally was built in 1920. The original building burned to the ground in the 1960s and a new one was rebuilt in its place. The pillars are the only items which remained from the original structure. Part of the movie "Universal Soldier" was filmed there. Between the station and Oatman there is a stone bridge on the narrow Route 66. The stone bridge is located in what is known as "Bloody 66" in Sitgreaves Pass. According to the book “The Big Roads”, authored by Earl Swift, the 18-foot stone bridge that crossed the wash was too narrow for two speeding cars to pass safely in opposite directions. One car would hit another or worse impale itself, and sometimes its driver, on the wooden guard rail.

== National Register of Historic Places ==
Among the structures listed in the National Register of Historic Places are the following:

- The Oatman Hotel - listed as the "Durlin Hotel" on August 25, 1983, reference: #83002988.
- The Oatman Drug Company Building - listed on April 6, 2006, reference: #05001064.

== Historic Oatman structures ==
Pictured are the following structures:

- The Oatman Hotel originally the Durlin Hotel - built in 1902 and listed in the NRHP``
- The Oatman Theatre - built in the 1920s
- The Oatman Drug Company Building - built in 1915 and listed in the NRHP
- The Oatman Jail and jail cell- established in 1936
- The Old Building - now a gift shop
- The Olive Oatman Restaurant and Saloon - built in 1925 and named after Olive Oatman
- Fast Fanny's Place - a former brothel

Also pictured:

- The Oatman Memorial - on Main Street
- The Clark Gable and Carole Lombard honeymoon suite in the Oatman Hotel. Allegedly Clark Gable and Carole Lombard spent their honeymoon in this suite, however after they were married in Kingman, Arizona, they returned to Los Angeles where they met with the press at Lombard's home.
Historic Oatman

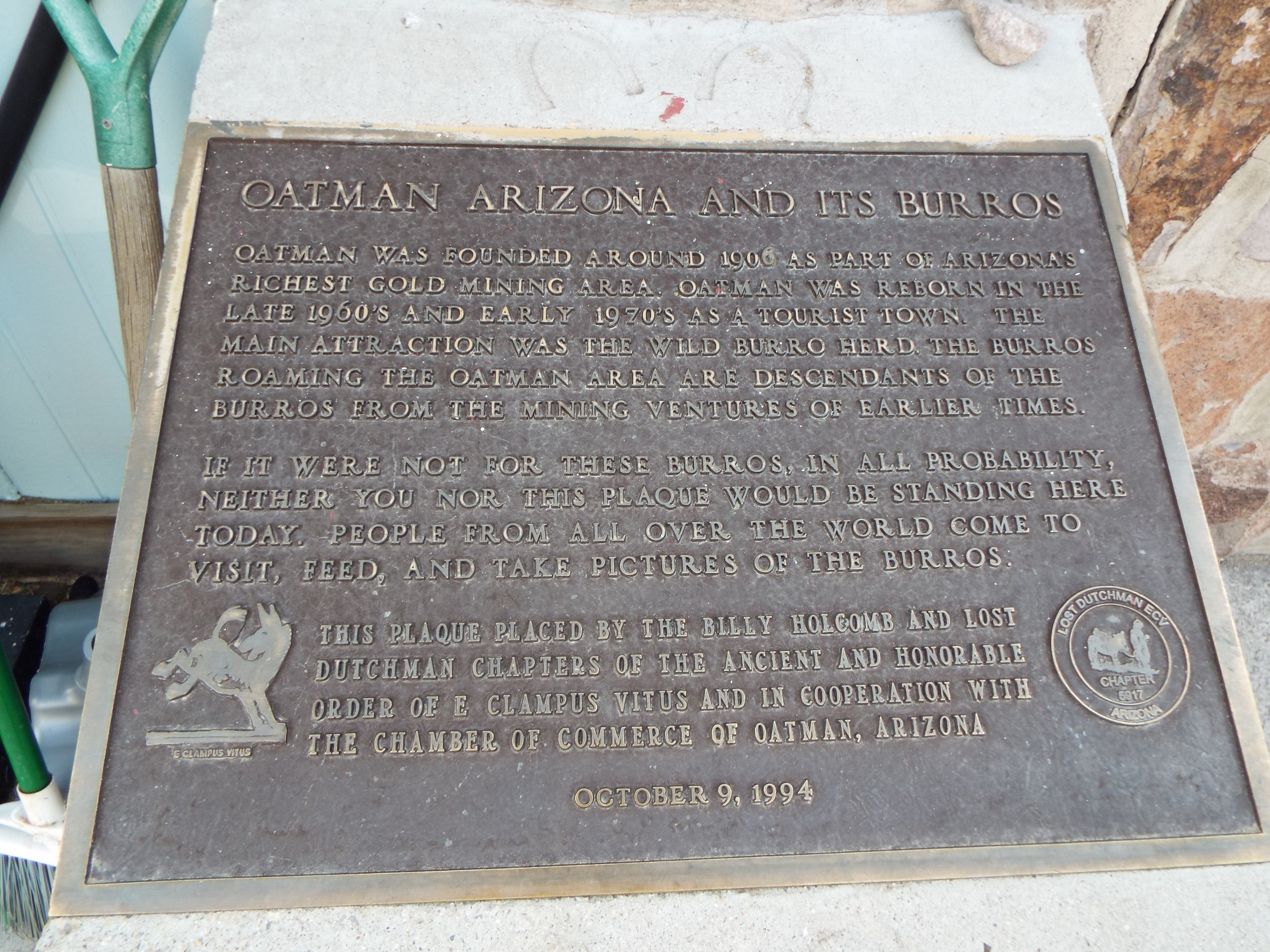
Oatman Arizona and its Burros plaque

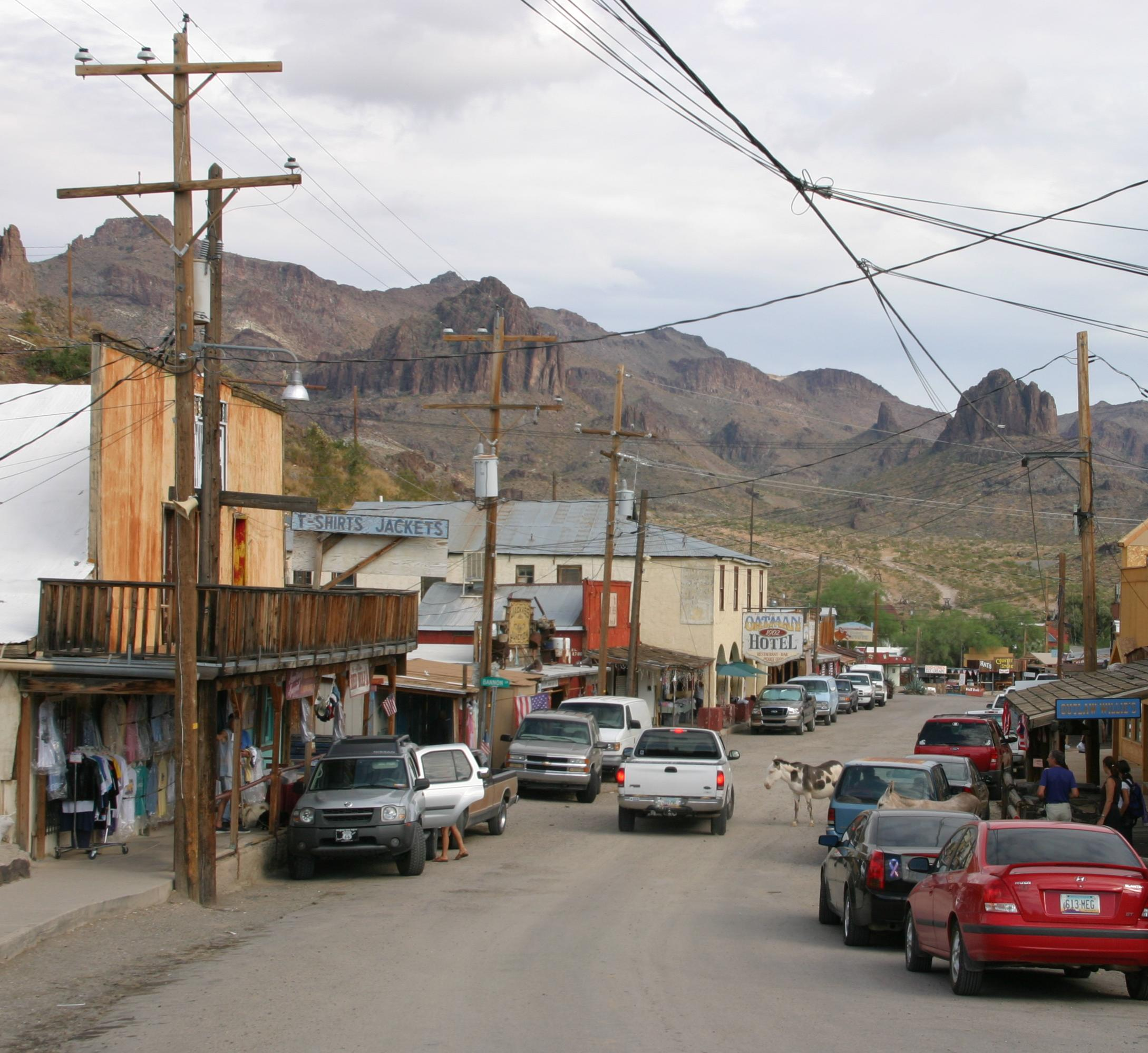
Oatman on Route 66

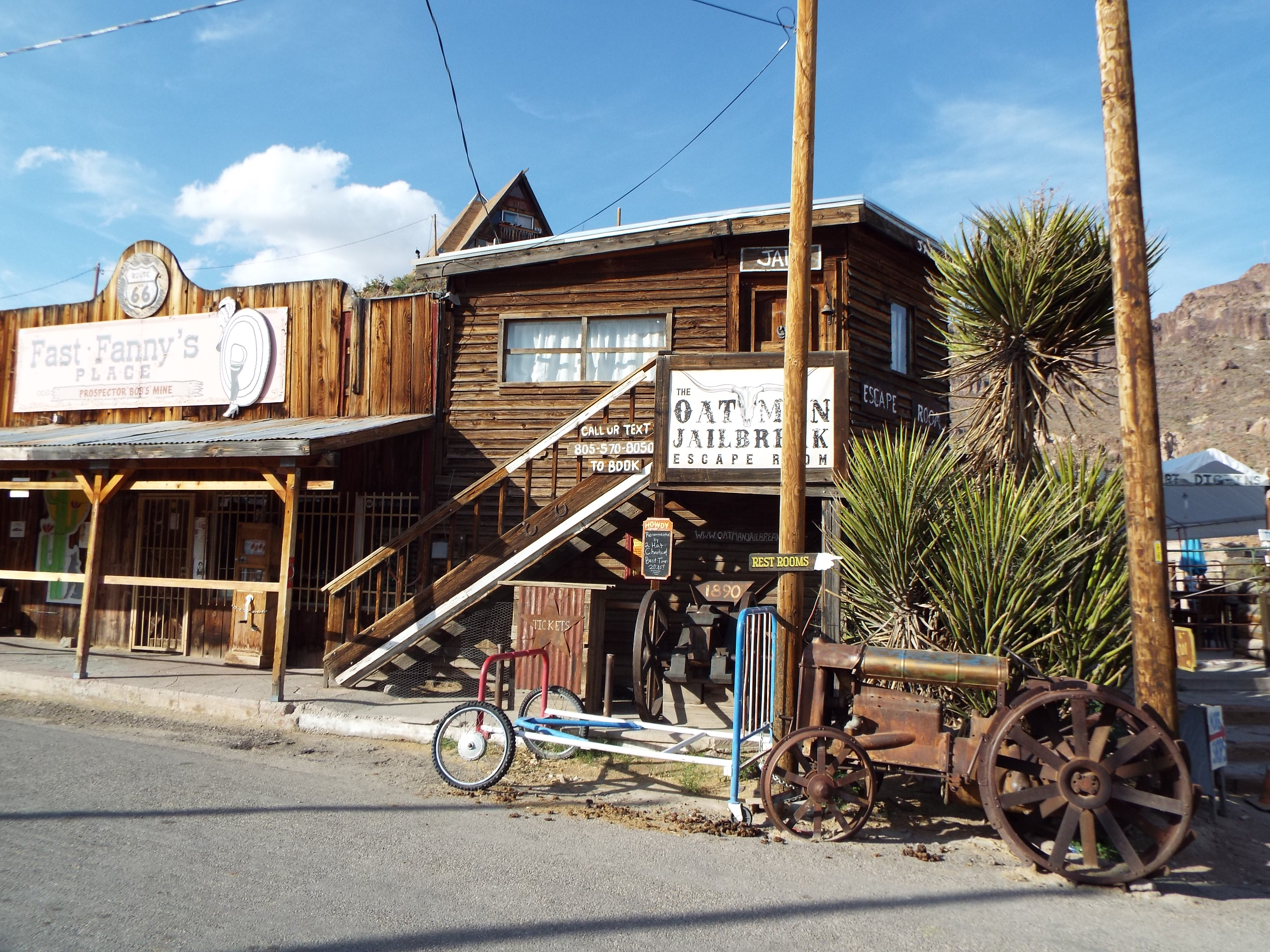
Oatman Main Street

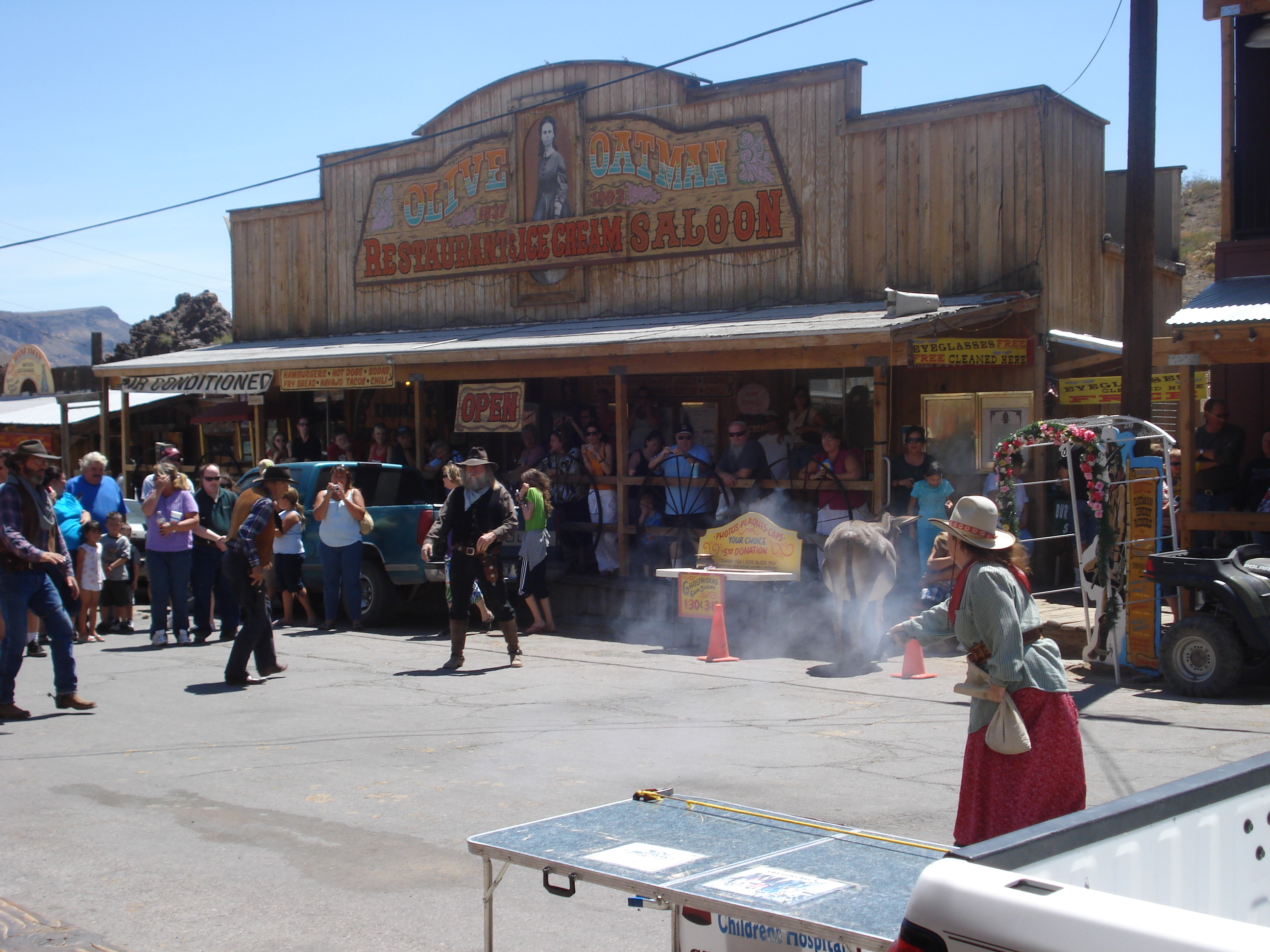
Oatman Theatre

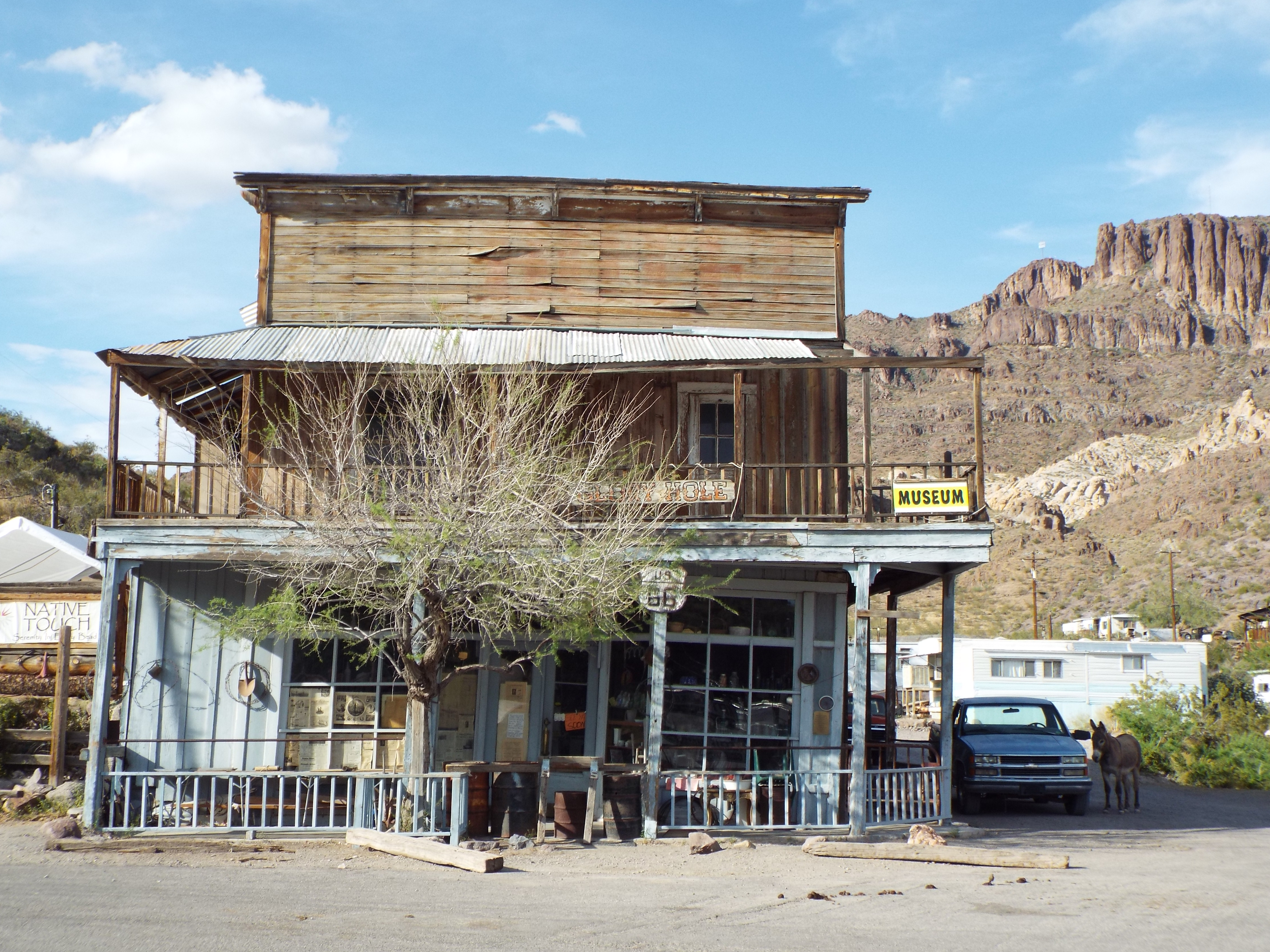
The Oatman Drug Company Building

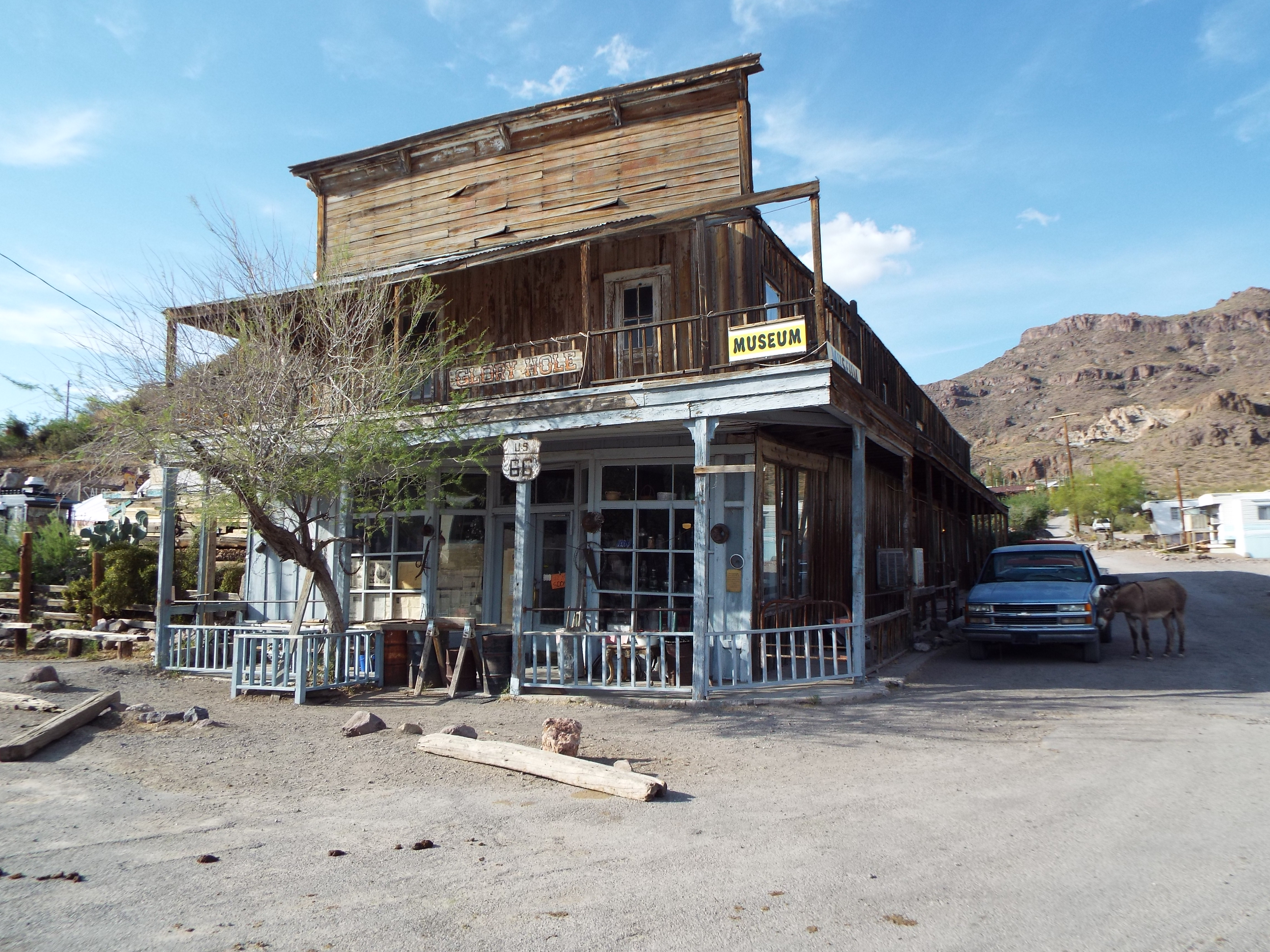
Different view of the Oatman Drug Company Building

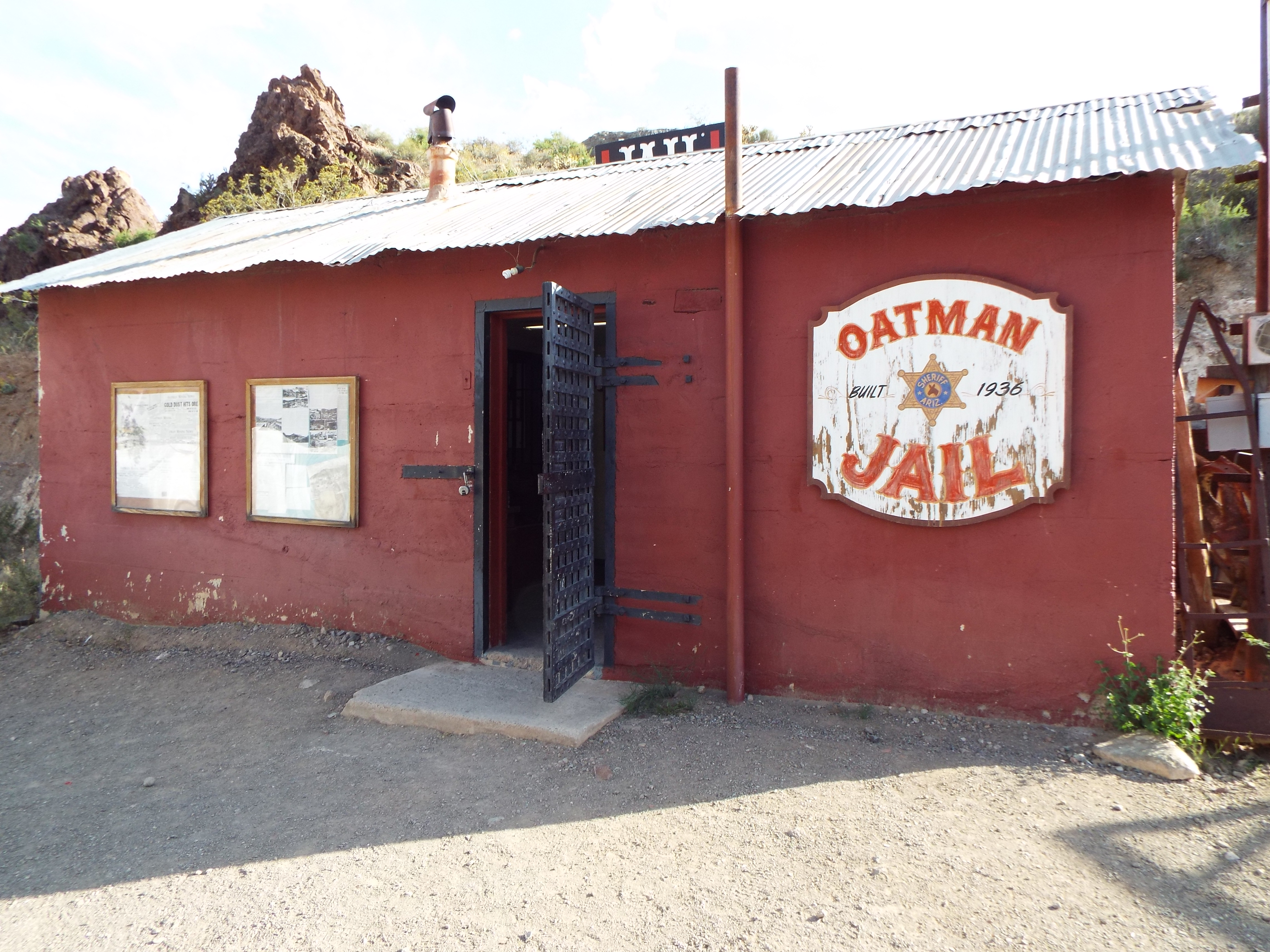
Oatman Jail

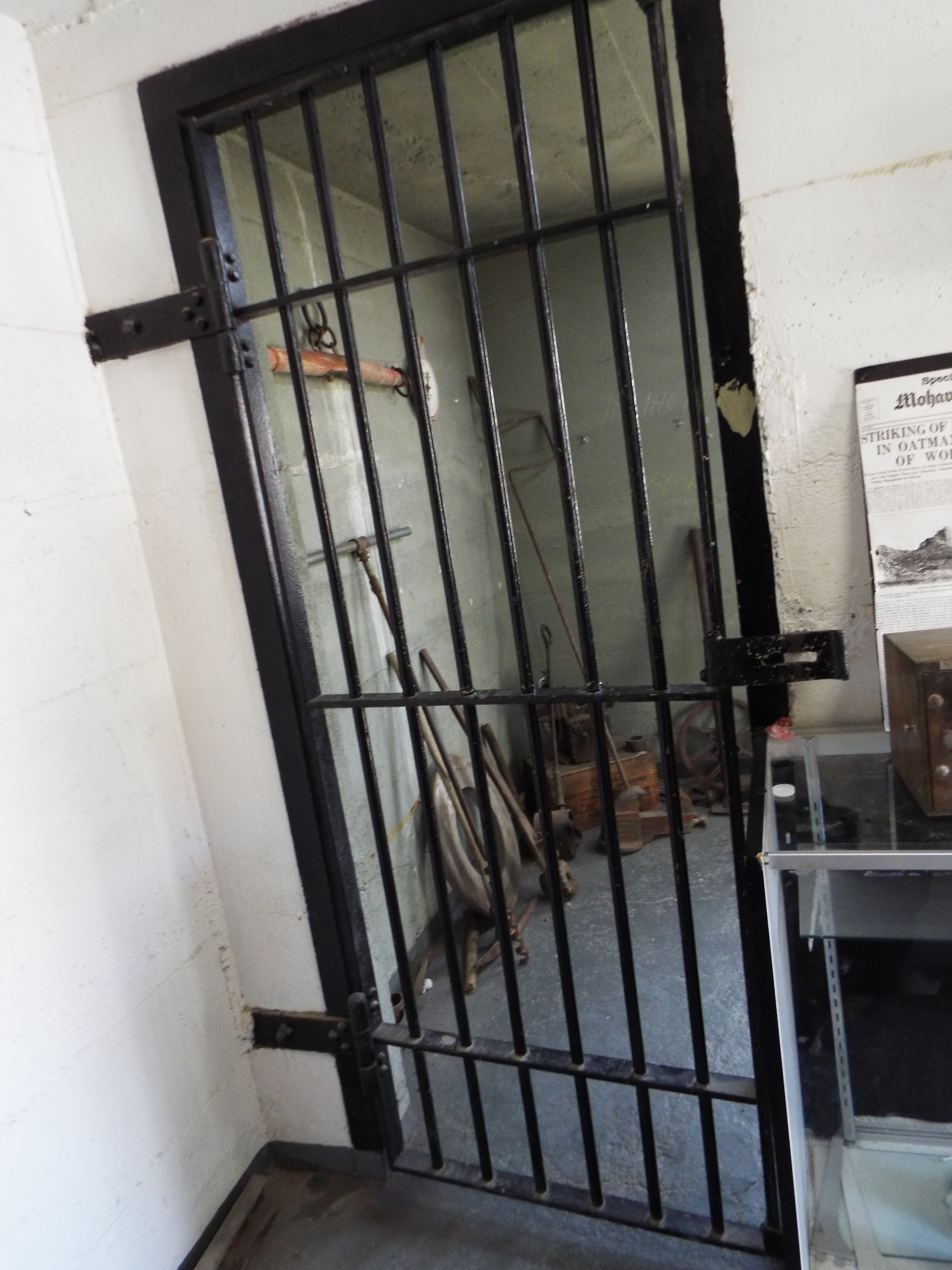
Oatman Jail cell

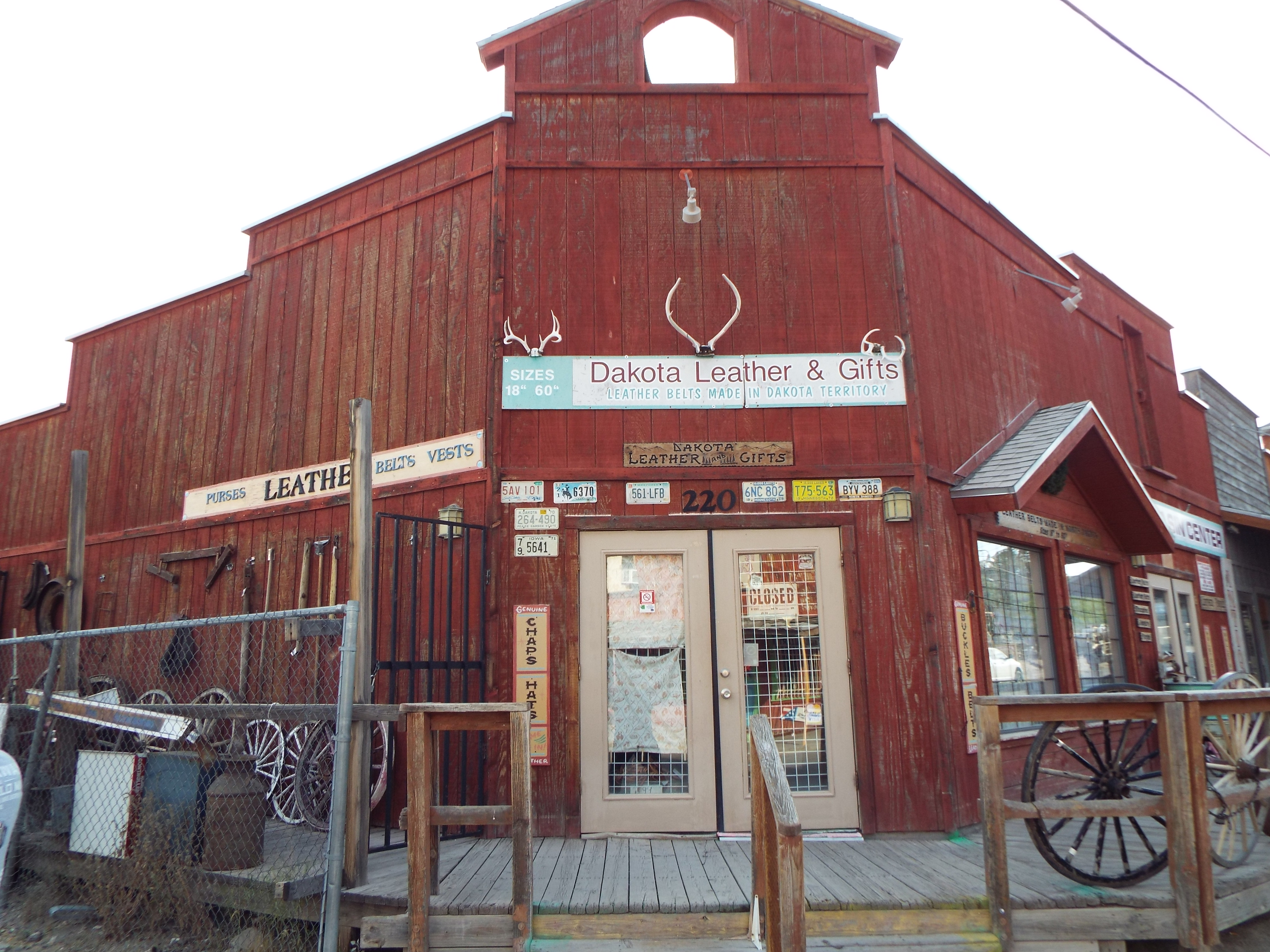
Old Building

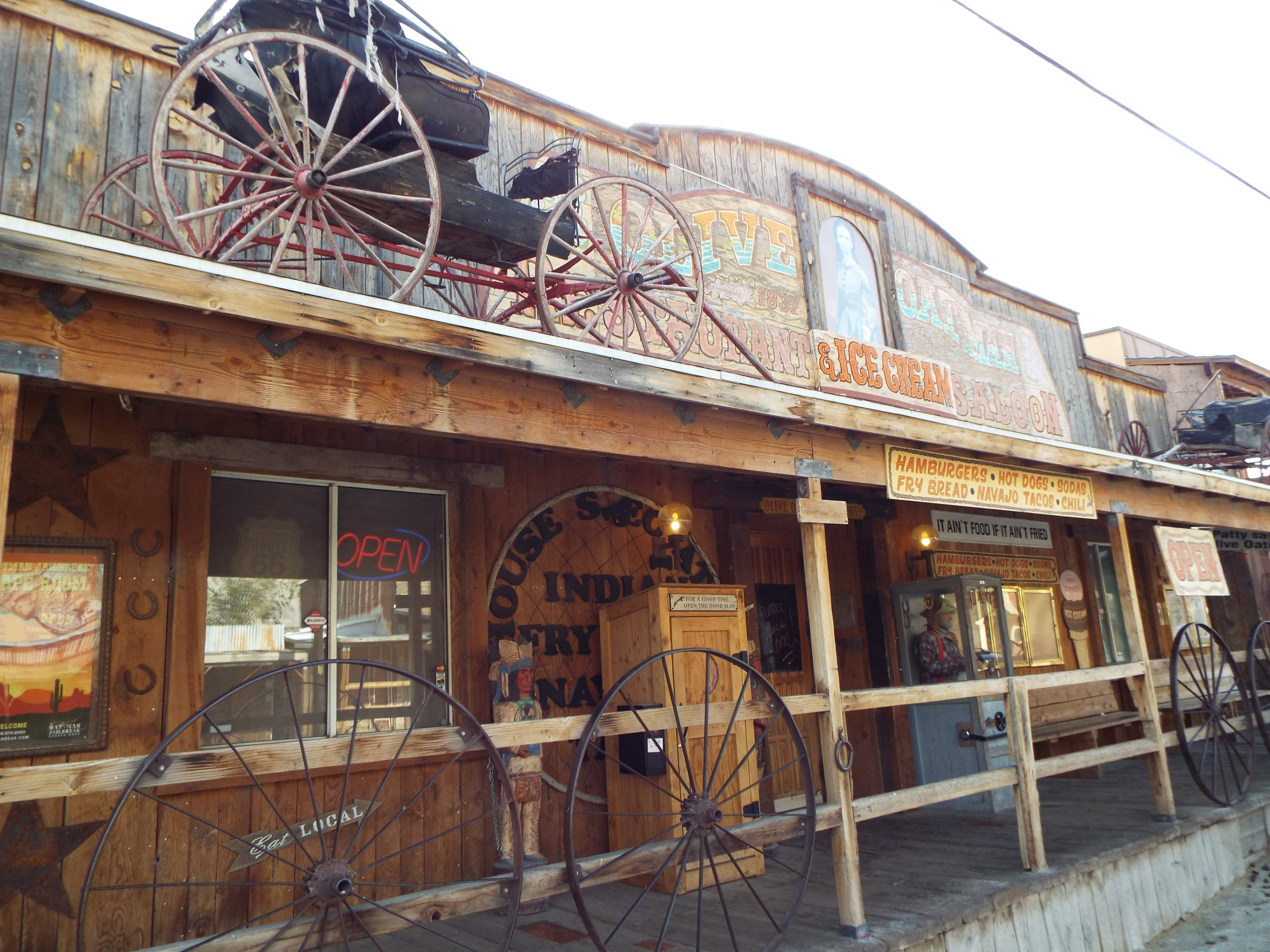
The Olive Oatman Restaurant and Saloon

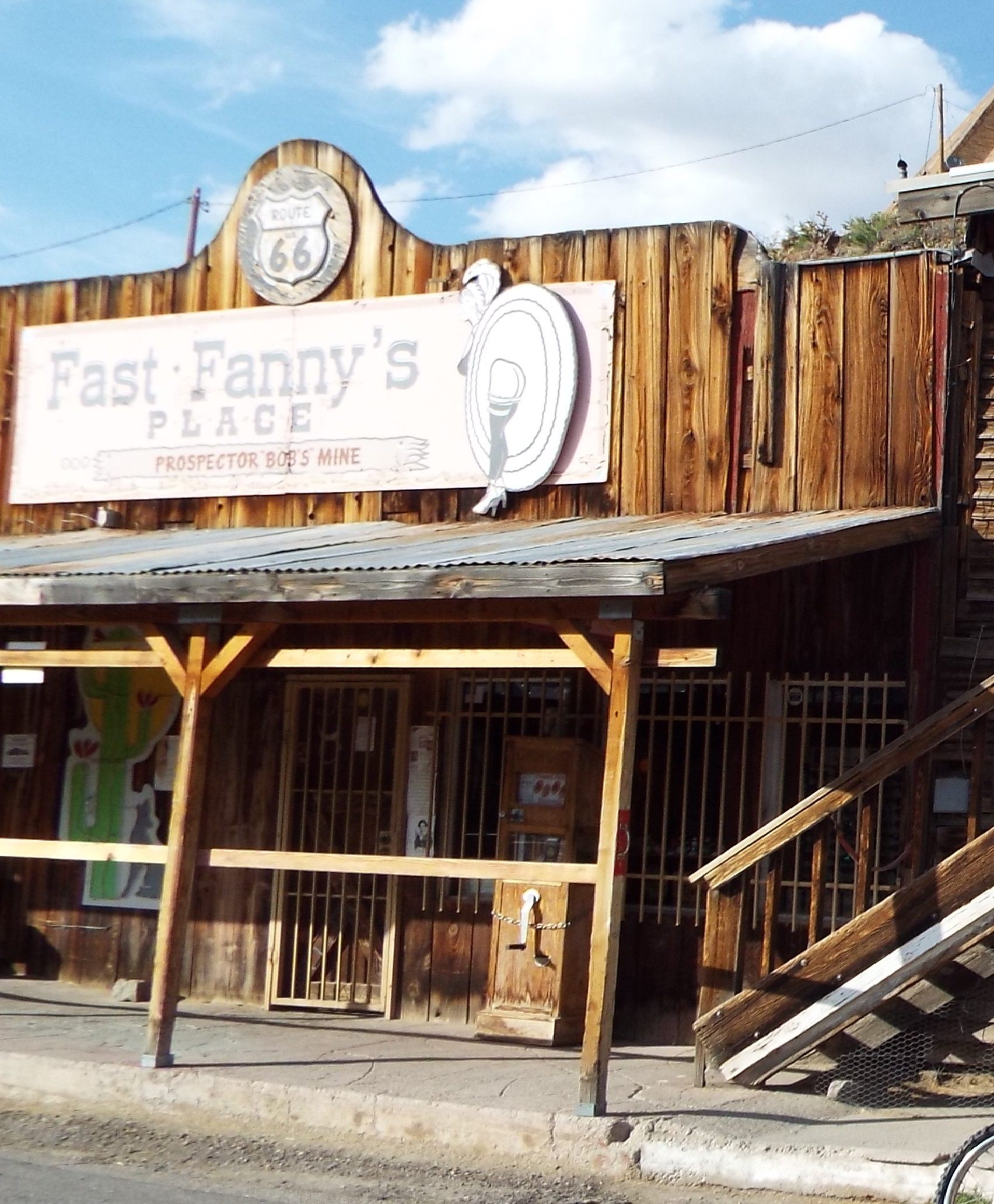
Fast Fanny's Place

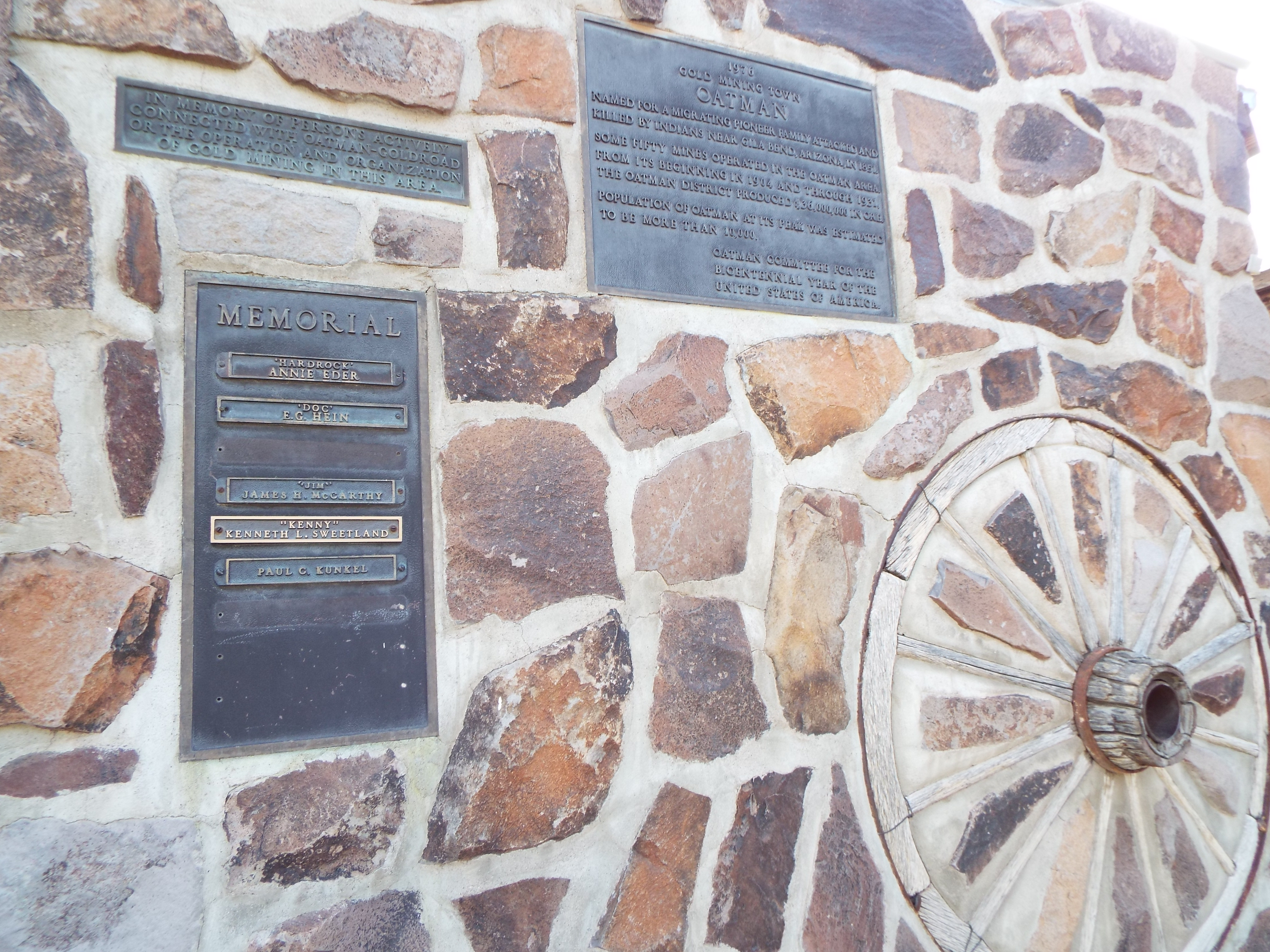
Oatman Memorial on Main Street

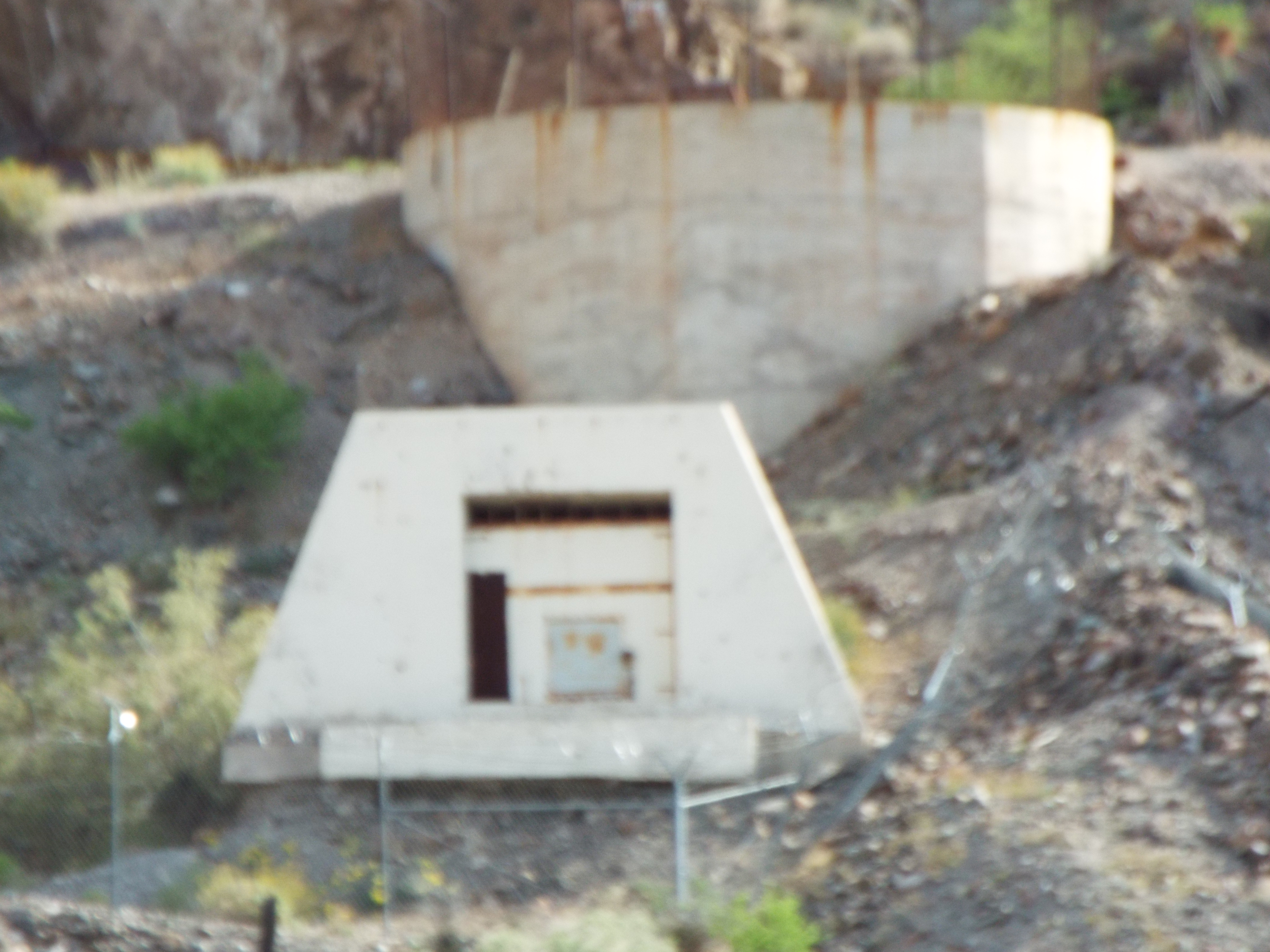
Entrance of the Gold Road Mine
Historic Oatman (Durlin) Hotel

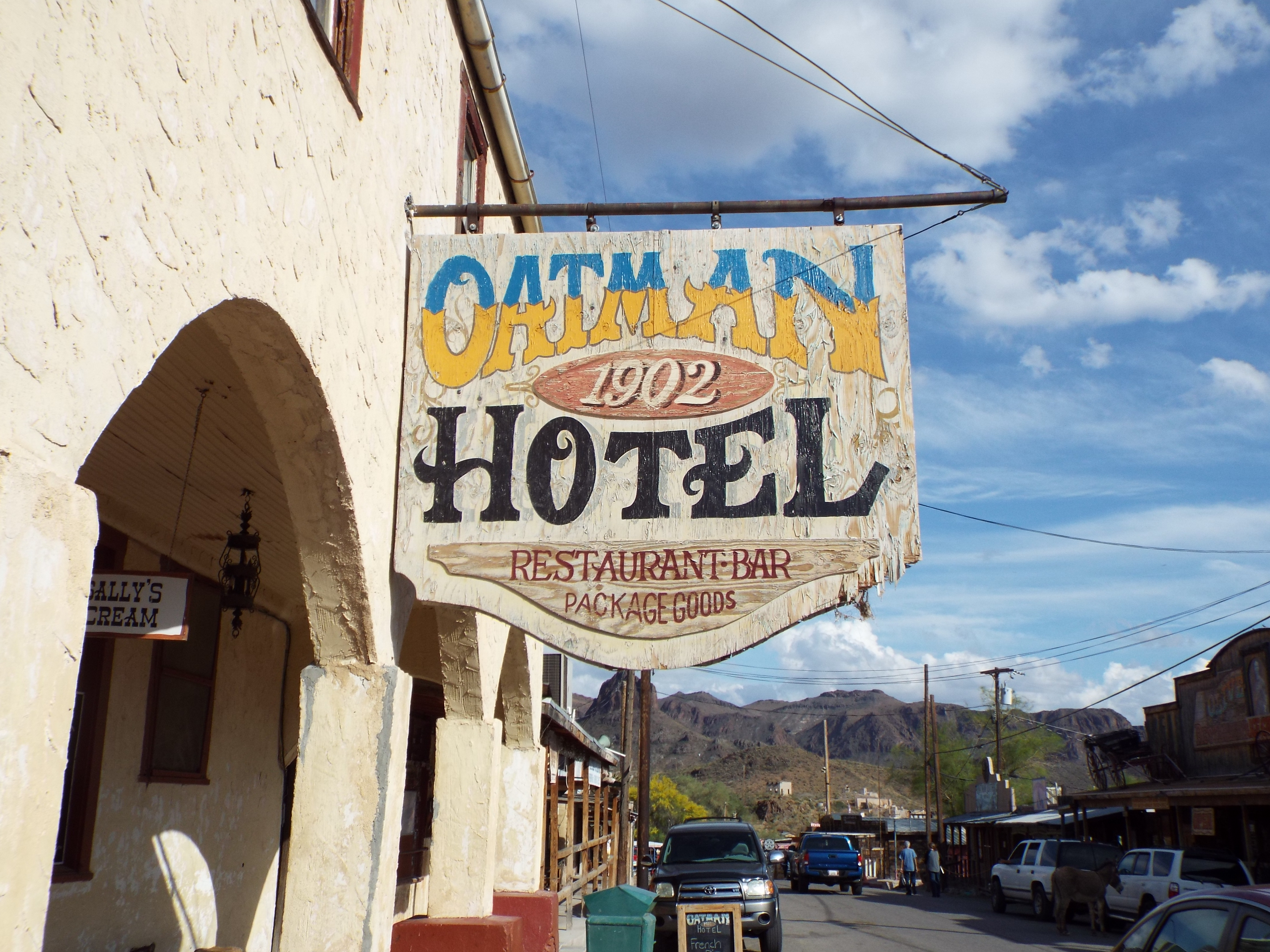
Oatman entrance sign

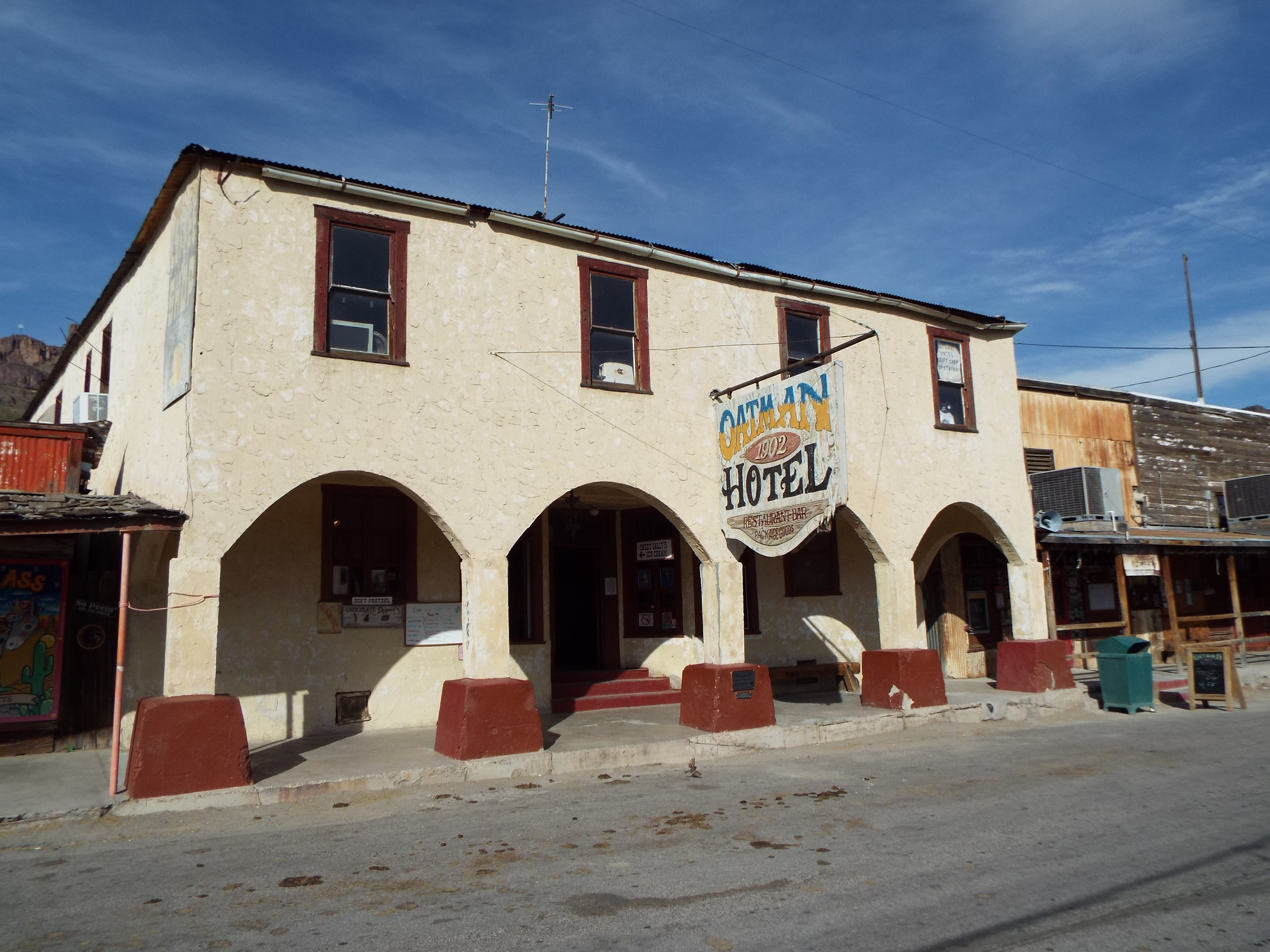
Oatman Hotel originally the Durlin Hotel

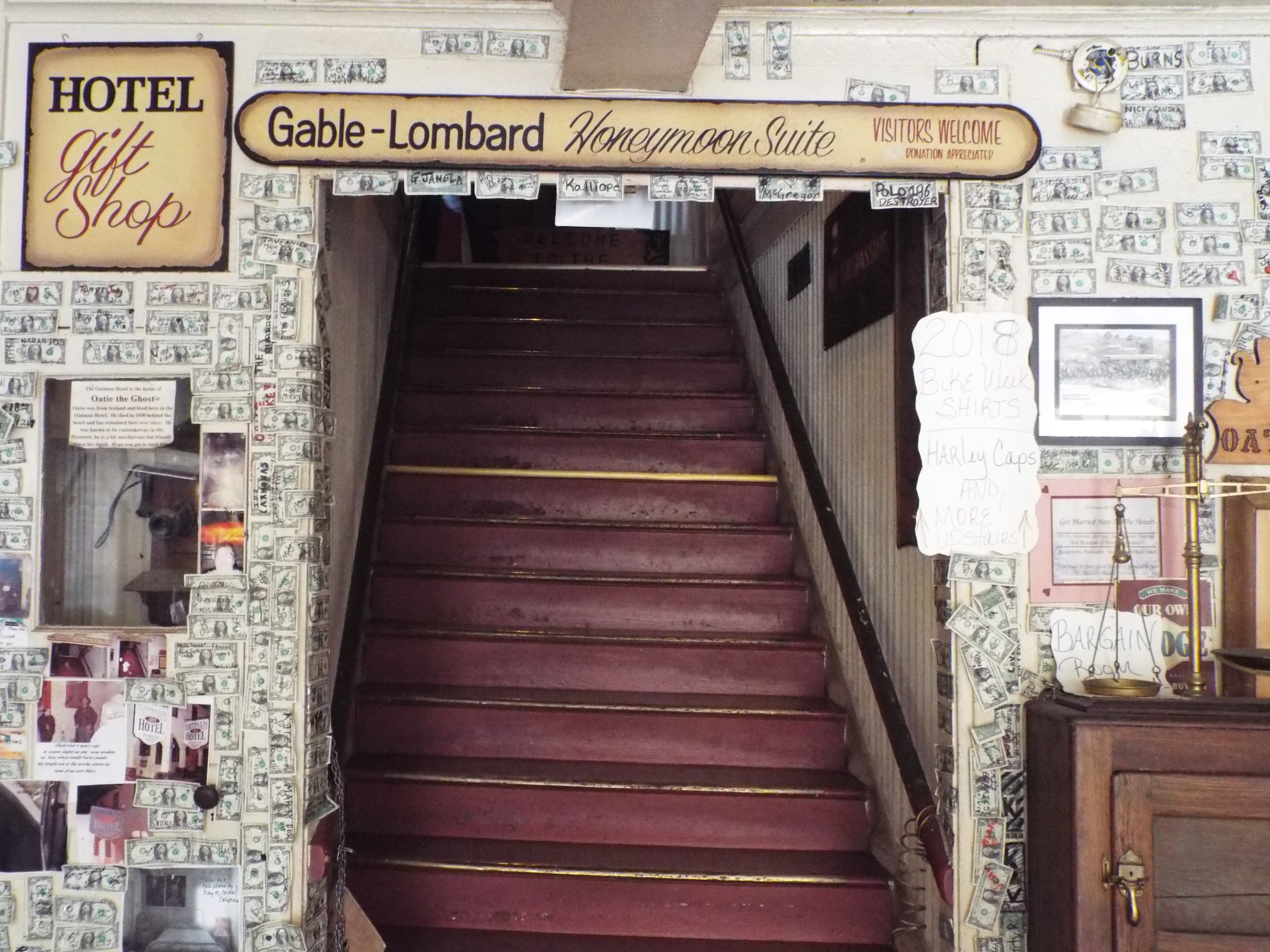
Inside the Oatman Hotel

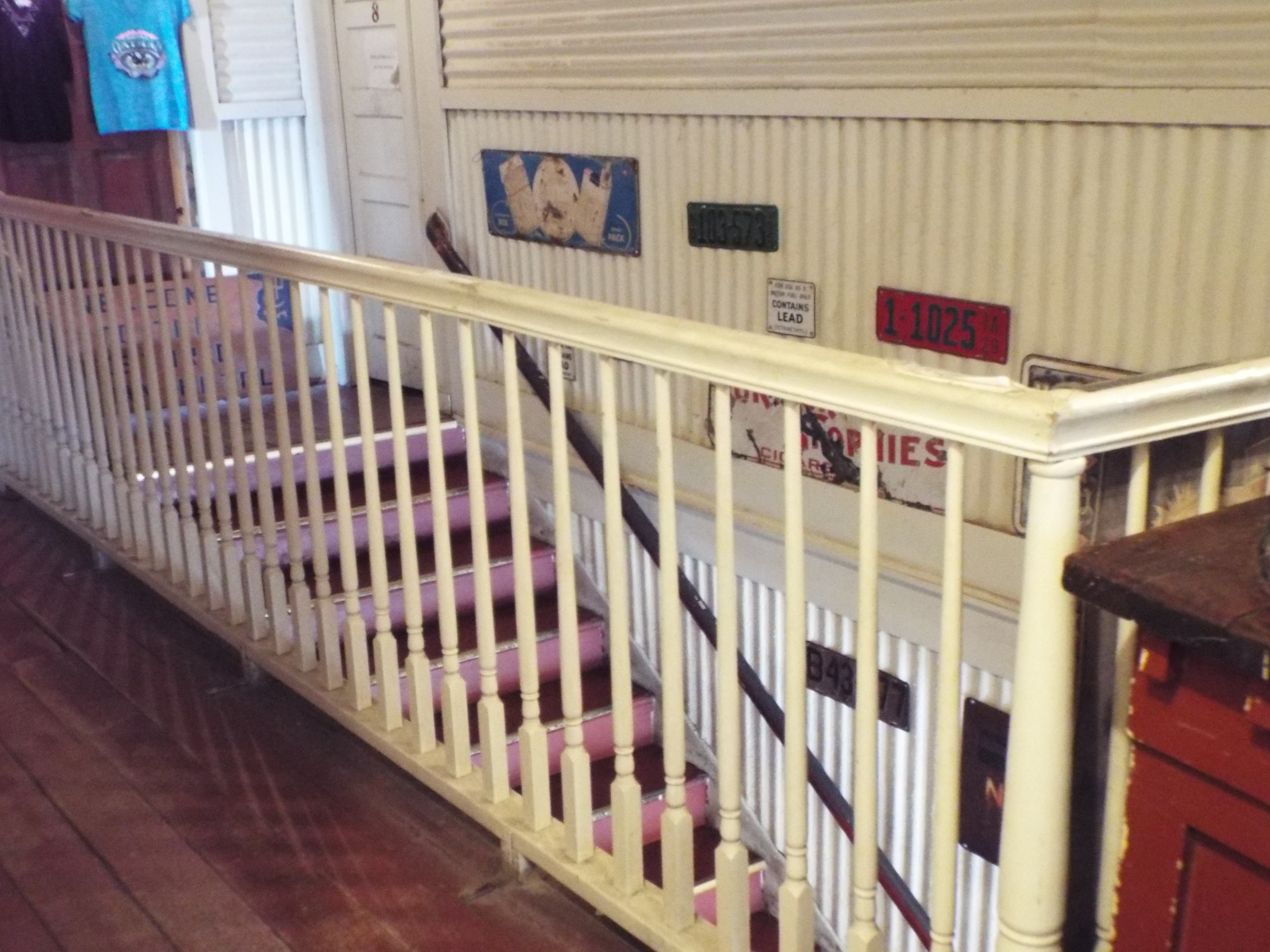
Second floor of the hotel

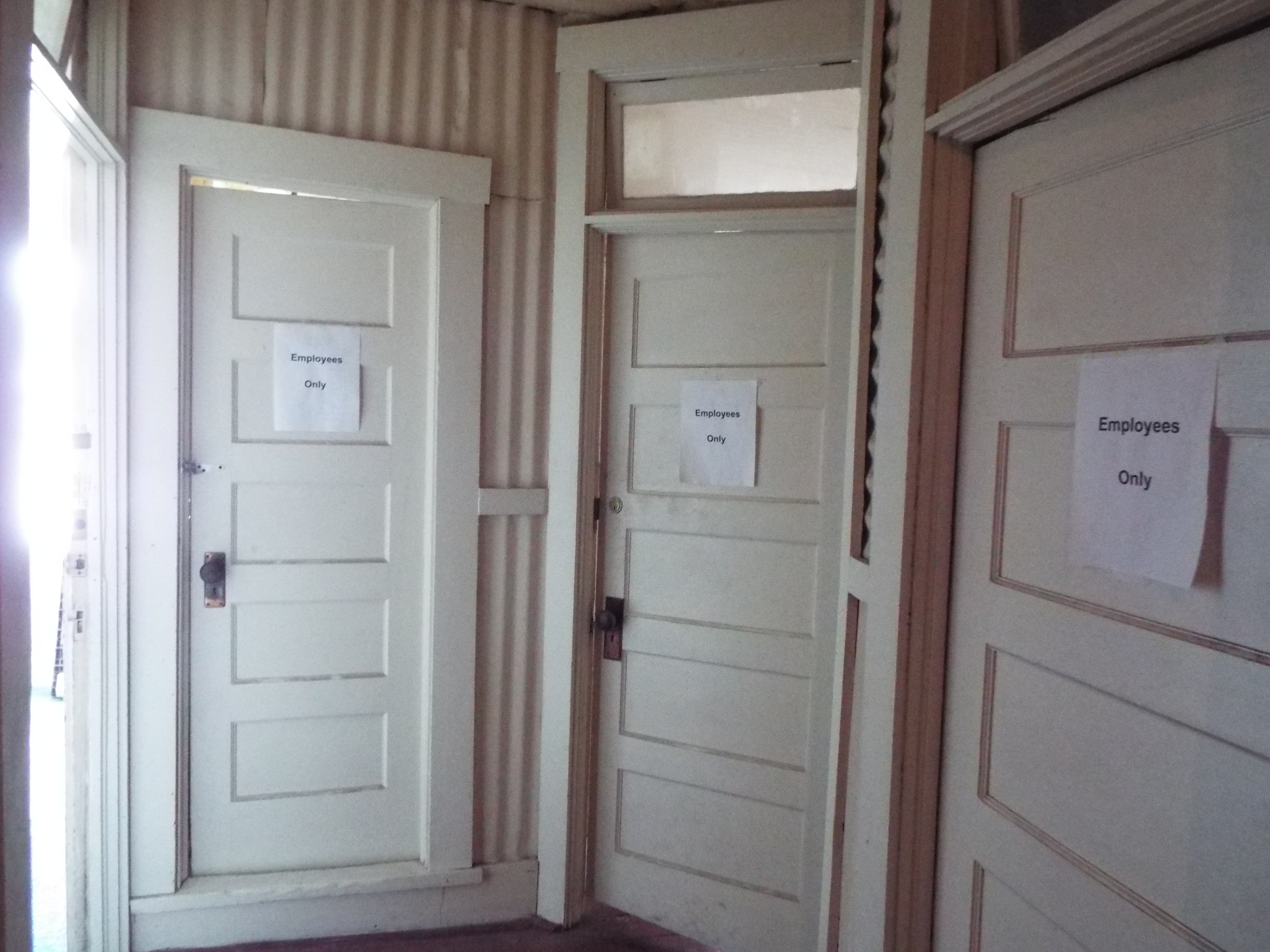
Hotel rooms in the second floor

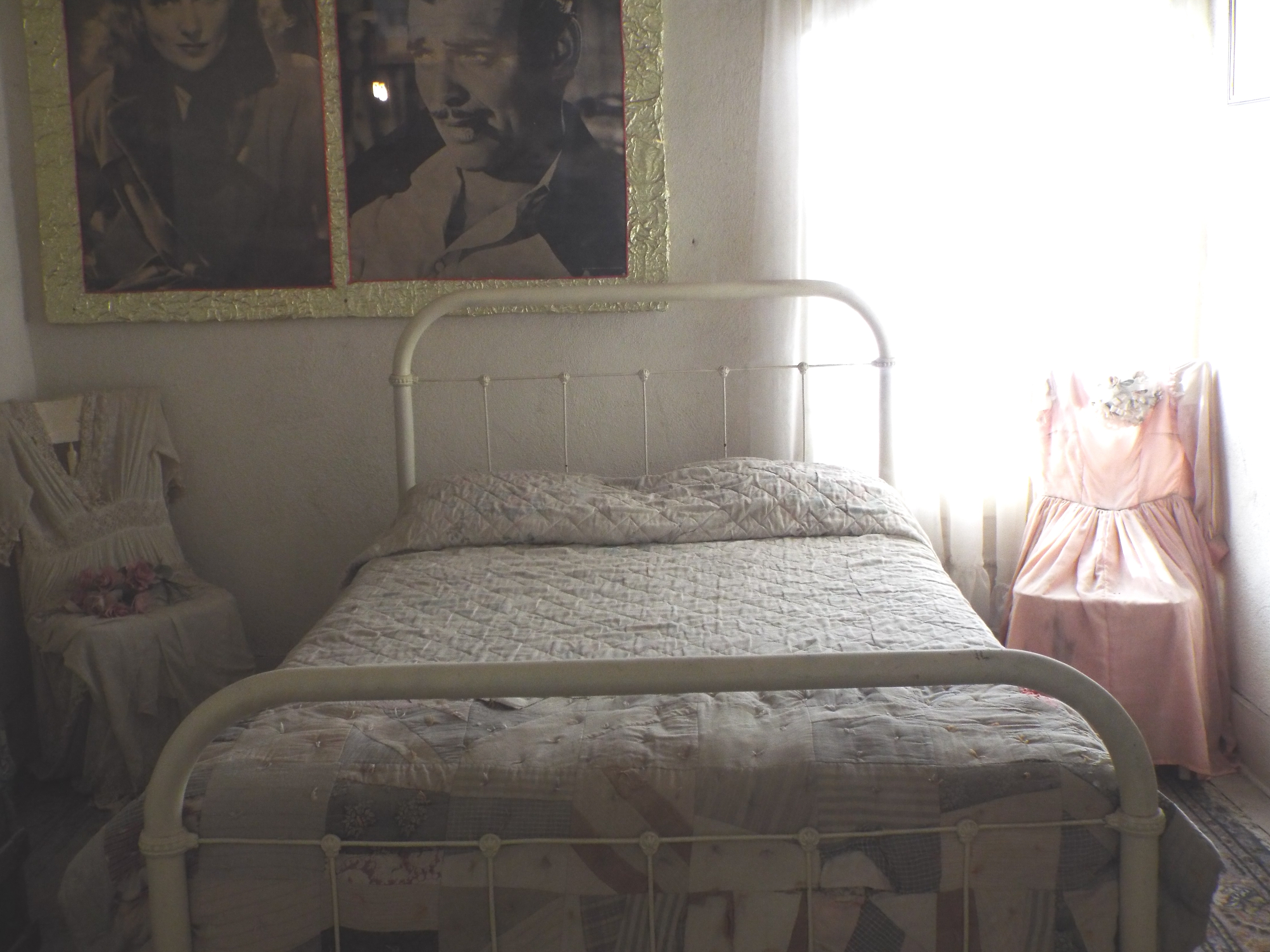
The Clark Gable and Carole Lombard honeymoon suite.
Cool Springs

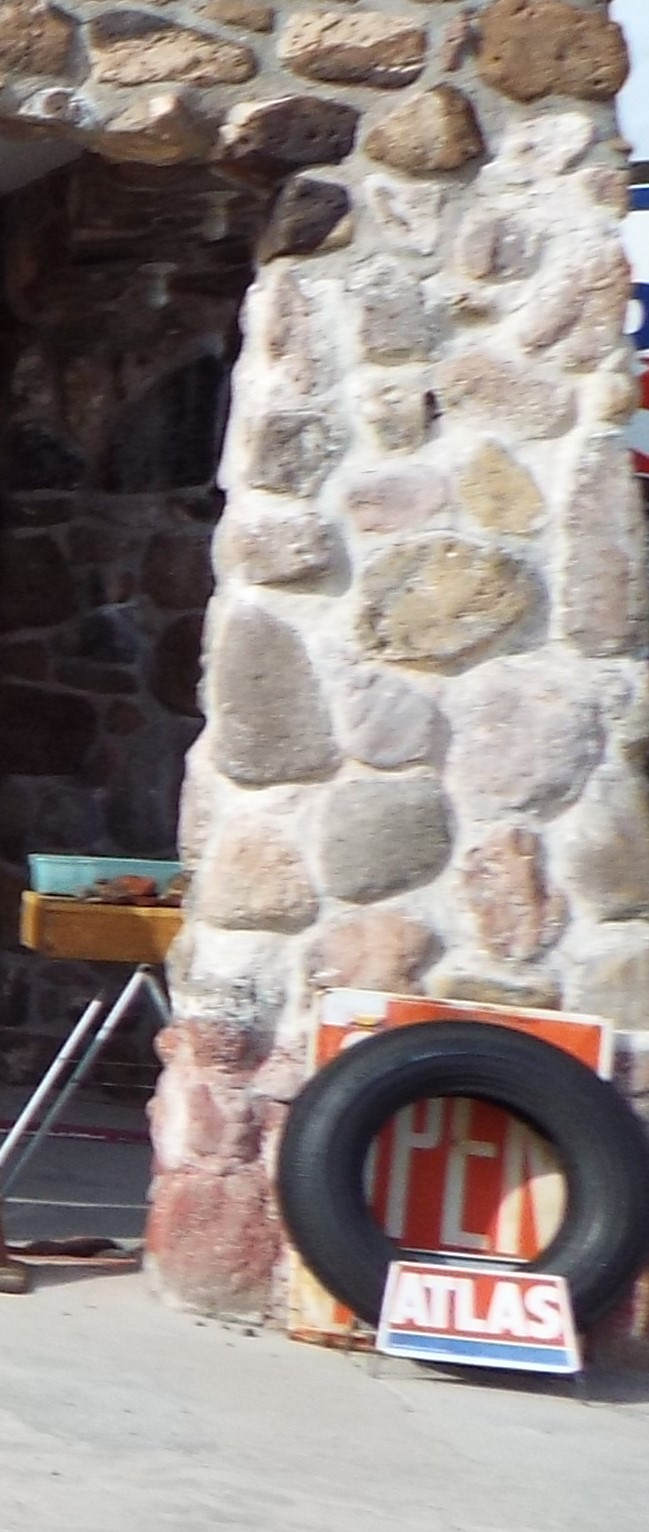
1920 original pillar of the Cool Springs service station

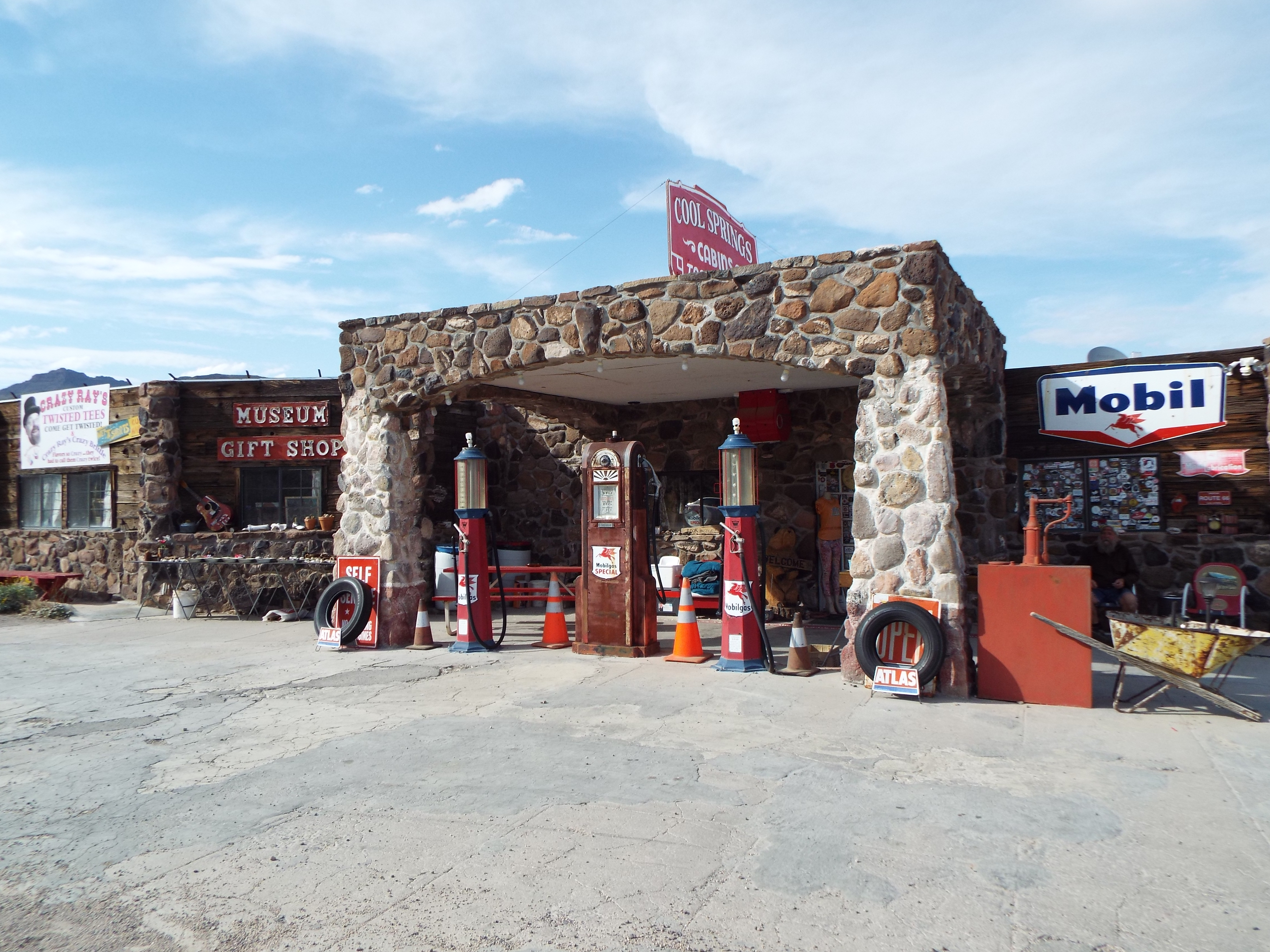
Rebuilt Cool Springs camp and service station

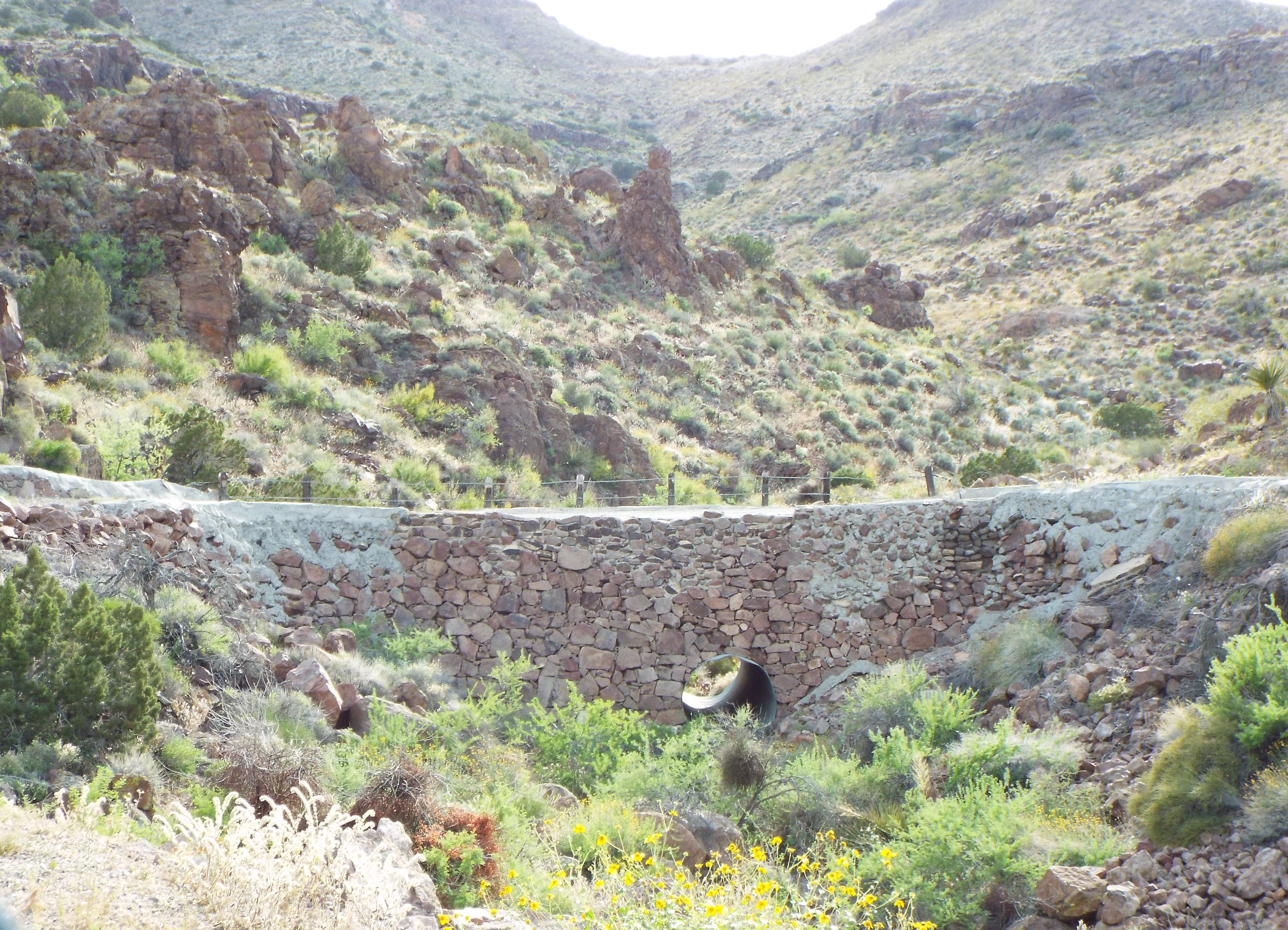
Narrow stone bridge on "Bloody 66" leading to Oatman

== See also ==
- Oatman, Arizona
- National Register of Historic Places listings in Mohave County, Arizona
