= Colorado City, Nevada =

Ghost town in the United States

Colorado City is now a ghost town, in Clark County, Nevada, located under Lake Mohave at the mouth of El Dorado Canyon.

== History ==
Colorado City was a mining camp in the Colorado Mining District (New Mexico Territory) and a steamboat landing at the mouth of the El Dorado Canyon on the Colorado River, for shipments via steamboats of the Colorado River. Founded in 1861, Colorado City, was at first located in New Mexico Territory, until 1863, when it became part of Mohave County of Arizona Territory. In 1867 it became part of Lincoln County in the state of Nevada.

In 1866, Colorado City became the site of two stamp mills, located there for ease of supplying wood to operate its steam driven mechanism. One was the old Colorado Mill brought down the canyon from El Dorado City, and refurbished. The other was the new New Era Mill.

== Site today ==
The site of Colorado City, and the Colorado River it was adjacent to, was submerged under Lake Mohave following the construction of the Davis Dam in 1951. What remains of Colorado City lies offshore from the site of Nelson's Landing. 35°42′27″N 114°42′42″W

== See also ==
- List of ghost towns in Nevada
