= El Dorado Canyon (Nevada) =

Coordinates: 40°31′5.84″N 118°13′19.94″W

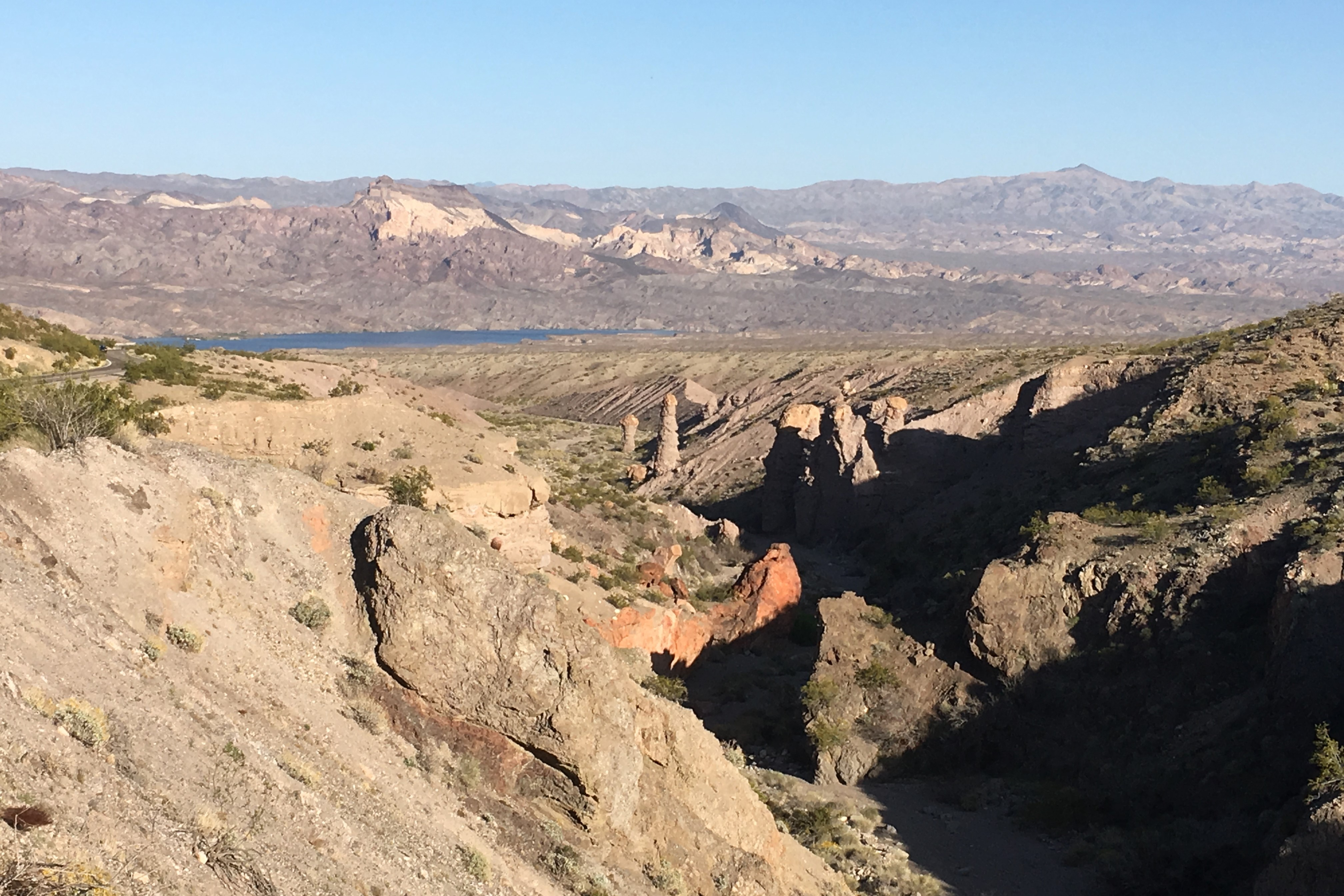
- El Dorado Canyon
- Interactive map of El Dorado Canyon
- Location: U.S. Highway 95 near Nelson, Nevada

Nevada Historical Marker
- Reference no.: 6

El Dorado Canyon is a canyon in southern Clark County, Nevada famed for its rich silver and gold mines. The canyon was named in 1857 by steamboat entrepreneur Captain George Alonzo Johnson when gold and silver was discovered here. It drains into the Colorado River at the former site of Nelson's Landing.

The town of Nelson lies in the upper reach of the canyon. Eldorado Canyon Mine Tours operates mid way in the canyon at the Techatticup Mine one of the oldest and most productive mines in the canyon.

== History ==
Prospecting and mining in the El Dorado Canyon started by 1857, if not earlier. But in April 1861, as the American Civil War began, word got out that silver and some gold and copper lodes had been discovered by John Moss and others in what became known as El Dorado Canyon, in New Mexico Territory, now Nevada. The canyon was on the west side of the river sixty five miles (104.6 km) above Fort Mohave at what was then considered the limit of navigation of the river. George A. Johnson came up river and made a deal to supply the mines with his steamboats at a lower price than that provided overland across the Mohave Desert from Los Angeles. That fall, news of the strikes in the Colorado Mining District (by 1864 also called the Eldorado Canyon District), brought a flood of miners to the canyon.

Several mining camps were founded in the canyon over the years. At the beginning San Juan, or Upper Camp, was at the top of the canyon miles from the river near the modern town of Nelson. Midway down the canyon near the Techatticup Mine were Alturas and Louisville. At the mouth of the canyon was the boat landing of Colorado City.

During the time of the American Civil War, three new mining camps developed in the middle canyon. In 1862, Lucky Jim Camp was formed along Eldorado Canyon above January Wash, south of the Techatticup Mine. Lucky Jim Camp was the home of miners sympathetic to the Confederate cause. A mile (1.6 km) up the canyon was a camp with Union sympathies called Buster Falls.

In late 1863, Col. John R. Vineyard, at the time a California State Senator for Los Angeles, completed a ten stamp mill the first in the canyon, on its north side just below Lucky Jim Camp, at what soon became El Dorado City. Vineyard's mill, assembled from mill parts salvaged from abandoned works in the Mother Lode country of California, processed the ore of its mines and cut out the cost of shipping the ore out to San Francisco for such processing, cutting costs in half. George Alonzo Johnson's steamboat company losing this downstream ore trade and making fewer trips up to the Canyon responded by raising its freight rates.

From 1865 to 1867, as part of Mohave County, Arizona Territory, El Dorado Canyon had its own post office.

In 1867, to secure the riverboat traffic and protect miners in the canyon from Paiute attacks the U.S. Army established Camp El Dorado, an outpost at the mouth of El Dorado Canyon that remained until it was abandoned in 1869. From 1870 the mines again were active to the point where from 1879 to 1907 El Dorado Canyon again had a post office, now in Clark County, Nevada.

The mines continued to produce ore until World War II.
