= John Thomas Moss =

Frontiersman, miner (1829–1880)

John Thomas Moss (March 4, 1839 – April 11, 1880) was an American frontiersman, prospector, and miner, who discovered several new mining districts in what is now Arizona and Nevada. After living with and learning the languages of many of the tribes in the area, he was a go between and peacemaker between American miners and local Native Americans, in the Southwestern United States.

== Early life ==
John "Johnny" Thomas Moss was born in Utica, Oneida County, New York on March 4, 1839, to Nathaniel William Moss (1815–1878) and Margaret Cardwell Moss (1815–1887). In 1857–1859, he left his family and traveled west where he trapped and rode for the Pony Express. In the 1860 U.S. Census, he was listed as working on his father's farm in Jenkins, Mitchell County, Iowa. He soon returned west, and became acquainted with and lived with the Paiute of Utah and the Hopi, Yavapai, Mohave and Pima of Arizona. He scouted for a short time for the Army at Fort Mohave, and claimed that in April 1861, he had floated alone down the Colorado River on a raft from Lee's Ferry through the Grand Canyon to Fort Mohave. But there were no witnesses to confirm this claim.

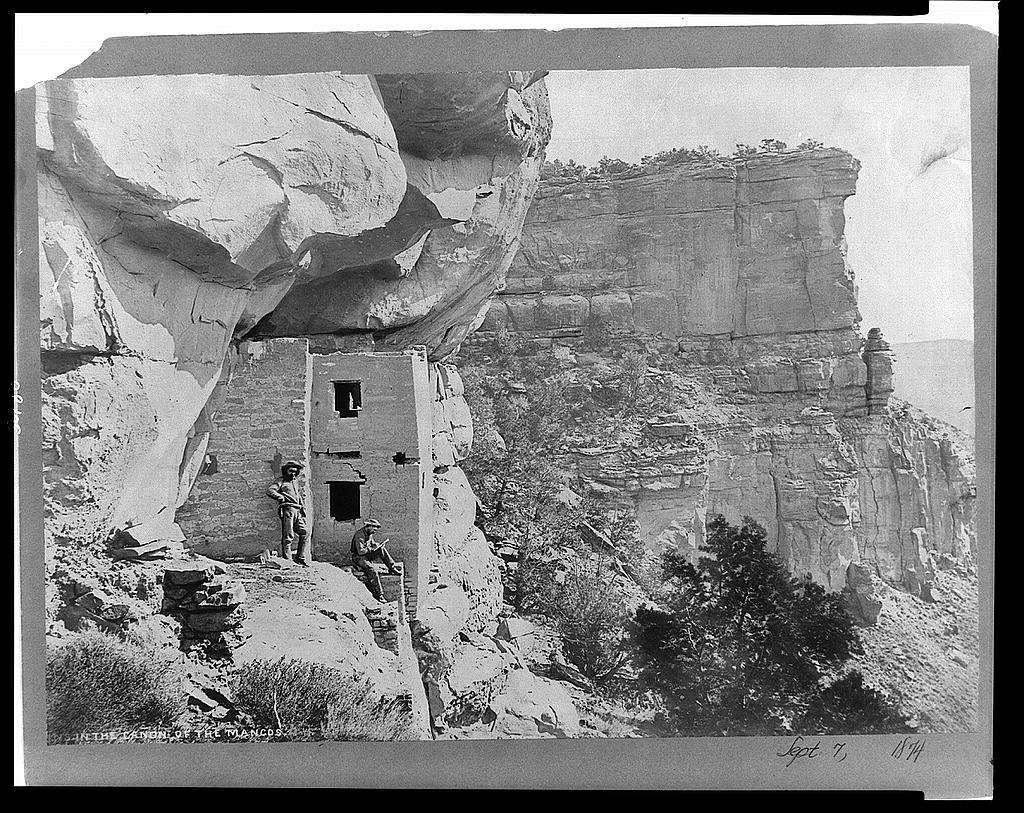

== Early mining ventures ==
In 1861, he was one of the more successful discoverers of rich silver lodes in El Dorado Canyon on the west side of the river above Fort Mohave. There he prospected, staked out claims for the Techatticup and Queen City Mines, in what became the Colorado Mining District then rushed to San Francisco to spread the word of the strike and sold his claims to mining speculators including George Hearst for a huge profit.

In 1862, he discovered the Moss Mine on the east side of the Colorado River, 9 miles from Fort Mohave in what became the San Francisco Mining District in the Spring of 1863. He dug out an estimated $250,000 in gold in a small pocket. He went to San Francisco claiming his mine was the most immense strike on record, surpassing the Comstock Lode, with ore assaying as much as $24,000 a ton and running for more than three miles with an average width of 100 feet. He then sold the claim for $30,000 to the Philadelphia Ophir Company whose backers included Thomas A. Scott.

Later in 1863, he went into the Hualapai Mountains and organized the Wauba Yuma Mining District, named for his friend the Hualapai chief Wauba Yuma.

== Trips to Washington ==
In a bid to get the job of Indian Agent for the new Colorado River Indian Reservation Moss took Irataba, a chief of the Mohave and Antonio Azul, of the Pima, to New York by sea from San Francisco via Panama and to Washington D. C. in early 1864. Returning in June he went back the next year but failed to get the appointment.

== Later mining ventures ==
For a time he prospected in the Sierra Nevada Mountains in California. He then crossed the Mohave Desert on foot, then returned to visit Iowa in 1871. He then returned to prospect in the desert regions of San Bernardino County. He became involved, innocently, on the periphery of the diamond hoax of 1872.

In 1873, Moss moved on to help to open the San Juan mining region in the southwest of Colorado. He established Parrott City in La Plata County, Colorado, named from one of his San Francisco backers. In September 1874 he guided the photographer William H. Jackson to the site of Mesa Verde.

In 1875, he married Alida Olson in the first marriage in La Plata County. He was elected to the state legislature from his county. Afterward he returned to San Francisco.

== Death ==
He died in San Francisco on April 11, 1880. as a result of complications from a gunshot wound he reportedly received from an Indian in Southern California.

He is the namesake of Mount Moss, a 13,192-foot summit that is six miles north of Parrott City.
