= San Juan, Nevada =

Ghost town in Nelson, Clark County, Nevada

Coordinates: 39°06′22″N 117°14′38″W

San Juan or Upper Camp is a ghost town that was a mining camp of the Eldorado Mining District. It was located in the upper reach of El Dorado Canyon, just below the present day location of Nelson in Clark County, Nevada.

== History ==
After silver was discovered in 1862 in the upper San Juan creek, a mining camp was established. The silver ore was transported by steamboats of the Colorado River It was determined that the small veins could not be mined for a profit, and San Juan was abandoned weeks later. A large stone building are the only remains from the settlement.
