= El Dorado City, Nevada =

Ghost town in Clark County, Nevada

Coordinates: 35°42′07″N 114°48′05″W

El Dorado City, which has become a ghost town, was a mining camp in the Colorado Mining District at the mouth of January Wash at its confluence with El Dorado Canyon. It was located about a mile (1.6 km) down the canyon from Huse Spring, at an elevation of 2,382 feet (726 m). Its site was located nearby to the south southeast of the Techatticup Mine, the primary source of the ore its mill processed.

"El Dorado" is a name derived from the Spanish meaning "the gilded".

== History ==
El Dorado City was the site of the El Dorado Mills or Colorado Mills, first stamp mill in the canyon, and perhaps in all of Arizona Territory. In late 1863, Col. James Russell Vineyard, at the time a State Senator from Los Angeles, completed a mill from parts of abandoned or closed mills brought from in California, at what became El Dorado City, to process the ore of the Techatticup Mine and other mines in the canyon. That cut out the cost of shipping the ore down the Colorado River by steamboat, and by sea to San Francisco for processing, thus cutting costs in half for those mine owners.

In 1866, the Colorado Mills were moved down the canyon from El Dorado City, to the landing at the mouth of the canyon and refurbished.

El Dorado City was first located in the Mohave County of Arizona Territory before it became part of the state of Nevada in 1867. However the dispute over this transfer was not settled in favor of Nevada until 1870, when El Dorado City became part of Lincoln County, Nevada. El Dorado City remained in existence into the 1880s.

== Present day ==
The site of El Dorado City is in Clark County, Nevada.

== See also ==
- Colorado Mining District (New Mexico Territory) — in El Dorado Canyon.
- Steamboats of the Colorado River — shipped processed ore out.
