= January Wash (Nevada) =

Arroyo flowing into El Dorado Canyon, Nevada, US

January Wash, an arroyo, tributary to El Dorado Canyon, in Clark County, Nevada. Its mouth is located at its confluence with El Dorado Canyon at an elevation of 2375 feet. Its source in the Eldorado Mountains near the Rich Hill Mine at 35°40′43″N 114°50′14″W.
