= Nelson, Nevada =

Nelson
- Census-designated place
- Nelson Ghost Town; Eldorado Canyon, Nevada

- Location within the state of Nevada
- Coordinates: 35°42′26″N 114°49′34″W
- Country: United States
- State: Nevada
- County: Clark (Eldorado Valley)

Area
  - Total: 4.80 sq mi (12.43 km^{2})
  - Land: 4.80 sq mi (12.43 km^{2})
  - Water: 0 sq mi (0.00 km^{2})

Population (2020)
  - Total: 22
  - Density: 4.6/sq mi (1.77/km^{2})
- Time zone: UTC-8 (Pacific (PST))
  - Summer (DST): UTC-7 (PDT)
- Area codes: 702 and 725
- FIPS code: 32-50600

Nelson is a census-designated place in Clark County, Nevada, United States. The community is in the Pacific Standard Time zone. The location of Nelson is in El Dorado Canyon, Eldorado Mountains. The town is in the southeast region of the Eldorado Valley. As of the 2020 census, Nelson had a population of 22.

== Geography ==
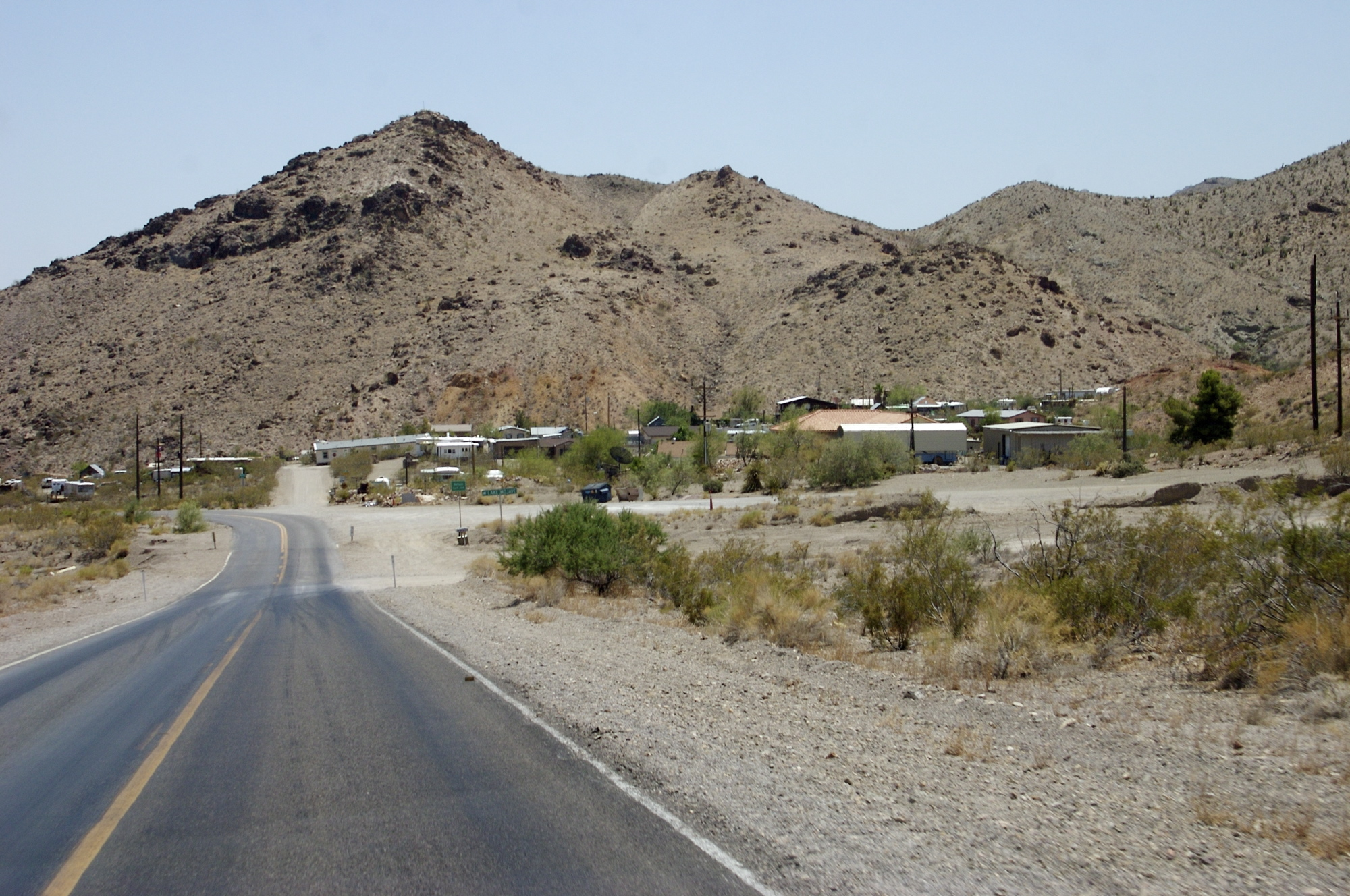
Nelson Nev

Nelson is located along Nevada State Route 165, about 8 miles (13 km) southeast of its junction with U.S. Route 95. Route 165 continues east 5 miles (8 km) to a dead end at Nelsons Landing on the Colorado River, 18 miles (29 km) by water north of Cottonwood Cove on Lake Mojave. Nelson is about 25 miles (40 km) from Boulder City by road.

Historical population
Census	Pop.	Note	%±
2020	22		—
U.S. Decennial Census

== History ==
=== Early history ===
The area known as Nelson was originally called Eldorado in 1775, by the Spaniards who made the original discoveries of gold in the area that is now Eldorado Canyon. The town was the site of one of the first major gold strikes in Nevada and one of the biggest mining booms in state history. Gold and silver were discovered here around 1859. The rush to the canyon began in 1861, several mining camps were established in the canyon, and a steamboat landing at the mouth of the canyon on the Colorado River, called Colorado City.

In its heyday, the area established a reputation for being rough and lawless. During the American Civil War, deserters from both the Union and Confederate armies would wander there, hoping that such an isolated location would be the last place military authorities would look for them.

Among the early mines established was the notorious Techatticup Mine in the middle of the canyon. Labor disputes, and disagreements over ownership and management, resulted in wanton killings so frequent as to be routine and ordinary. Despite the sinister reputation of the mine, it along with others in the town produced several million dollars in gold, silver, copper and lead. The mines in the canyon were active from about 1858 until 1945.

The community called Nelson was named for Charles Nelson, a camp leader who was slain in his home, along with four other people, in 1897 by the renegade Indian, Avote.

Between 1901 and 1905, the San Pedro, Los Angeles and Salt Lake Railroad was built across southern Nevada, through Las Vegas, to Daggett, California where it connected to the AT&SF, and the complete Salt Lake–Los Angeles line was opened on May 1, 1905. Because this nearby railhead ended the need for steamboats at Eldorado Canyon, the landing and the mill there were abandoned. The town of Nelson was born near the head of the canyon nearest the road to the railroad, the post office of Eldorado was closed on August 31, 1907 and moved to Nelson.

=== Nelson's Landing ===
Nelson's Landing, about 5 miles (8 km) east of Nelson at the downstream end of Eldorado Canyon, was the village and landing established on the Colorado River reservoir, Lake Mohave, where the canyon had its confluence with the lake. The wharf area of Nelson's Landing was destroyed during a flash flood on September 14, 1974. 35°42′27″N 114°42′42″W

Nelson's Landing washed into Lake Mohave after a strong downpour in the regional mountains sent the runoff down the channels and produced a flash flood. There are five wide channels that run from the local mountains toward the river, all of which converge into a small outlet where Nelson's Landing was. The entire landing and village were destroyed and ten people died when the flood came through the wash. Among those killed was Ted Ducey, head coach of basketball at Claremont Men's College, now Claremont McKenna College. The wall of water and debris was reported as about 40 feet (12 m) high as it reached the river.

== Today ==
The mines and the landing are accessible through the town of Nelson off US 95 about 25 miles southeast of Las Vegas. Much of Nelson, which was not impacted by the 1974 flood, remains today and is located near the top of the wash, away from the flood channels. The sparsely populated community consists mainly of privately owned ranch houses, and a river and mining tour business housed in a former Texaco gas station, north of the road from the Techatticup Mine, that has been used as a filming location for several feature films, including 3000 Miles to Graceland.

The fate of Nelson's Landing is a warning to visitors to this region who should watch for conditions leading to flash flooding. They should also be cautious of open mines and ventilation shafts.

== In popular culture ==
Nelson appears in the 2010 videogame Fallout: New Vegas and in season 4, episode 4 of the TV show Love on the Spectrum.

== See also ==
- Nevada State Route 165
