= Nevada State Route 165 =

State highway in Nevada, United States

State Route 165
- Nelson Road
- Nevada State Route 165, highlighted in red

Route information
- Maintained by NDOT
- Length: 11.023 mi (17.740 km)
- Existed: July 1, 1976–present

Major junctions
- West end: US 95 in Boulder City
- East end: Western Street in Nelson

Location
- Country: United States
- State: Nevada
- County: Clark

Highway system
- Nevada State Highway System; Interstate; US; State; Pre‑1976; Scenic
← SR 164	→ SR 168

State Route 165 (SR 165) is a state highway near the southern end of the U.S. state of Nevada. The road connects the town of Nelson to U.S. Route 95. The road originated in the 1940s and was one section of former State Route 60 until 1976.

== Route description ==
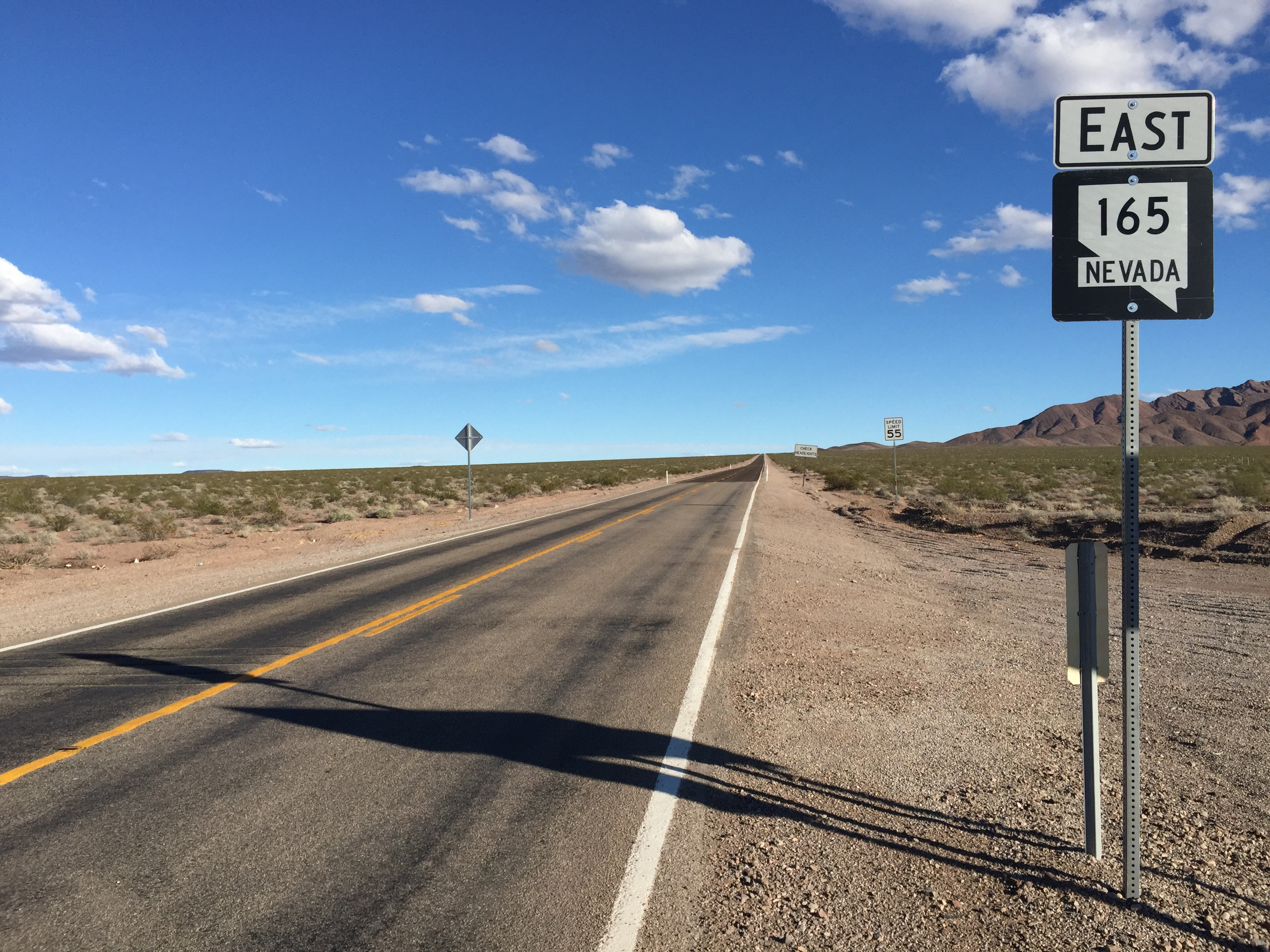
View from the west end of SR 165 looking eastbound in 2015

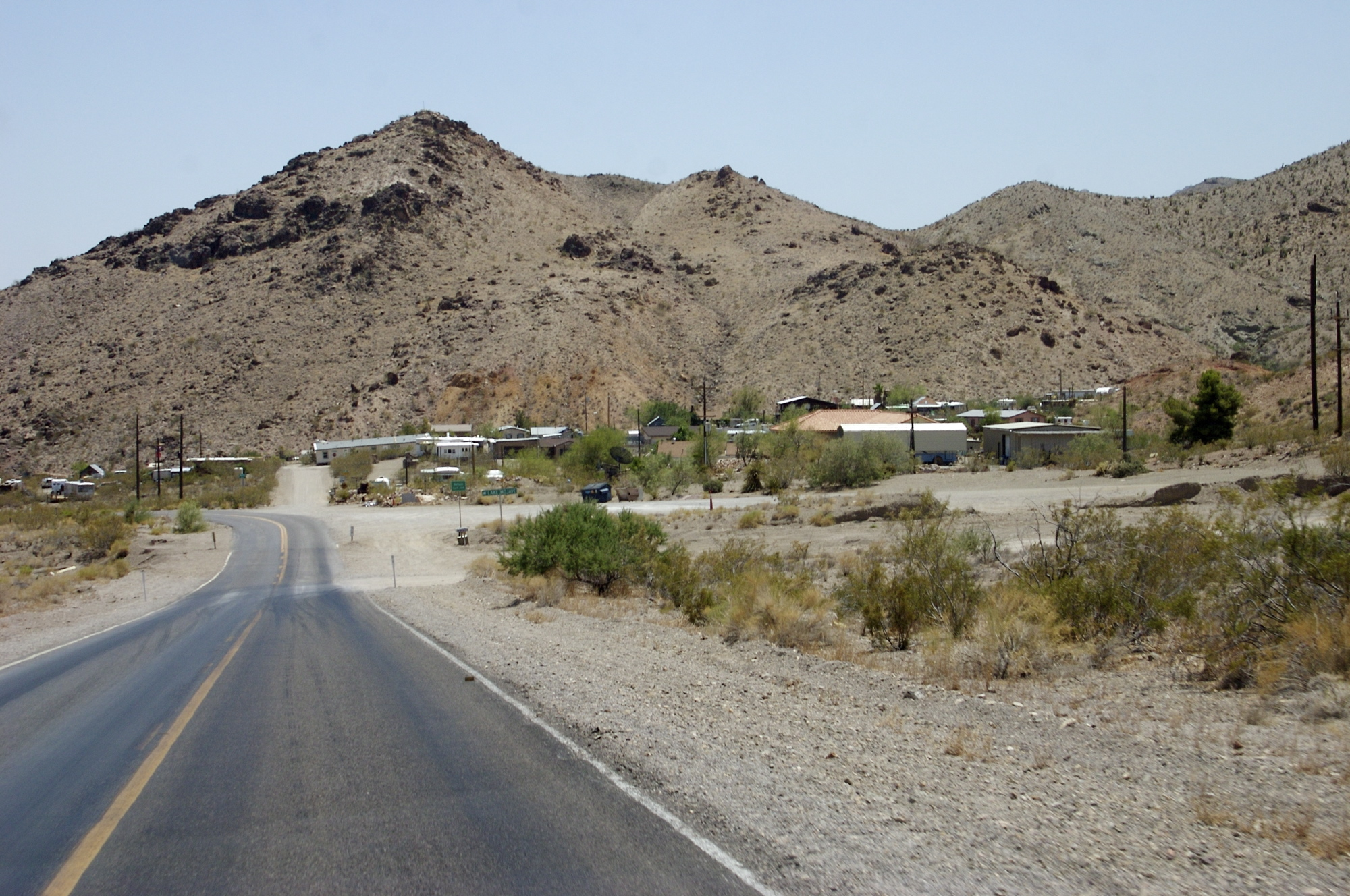
SR 165 eastbound entering the town of Nelson in 2007

SR 165 begins at a junction with US 95 approximately 10 miles (16 km) south of Boulder City. From there, the state highway follows Nelson Road in a southeasterly direction through Eldorado Valley 11 miles (18 km) to its end just outside the town of Nelson. The town of Nelson was established in 1905 following several mining claims being discovered in the valley. Although the small community is still inhabited, the remains of many mining operations and abandoned structures can still be seen in the vicinity.

== History ==
SR 165 was the northwest leg of State Route 60 prior to 1976

The route first appears on state highway maps in 1941 as part of State Route 60, a three-pronged route with each spoke connecting to the town of Nelson. The 16-mile (26 km) northwest leg connected to US 95 about 4 miles (6.4 km) south of Boulder City while the 10-mile (16 km) southwest leg reached US 95 further south via the Nelson Cutoff Road. The third leg of SR 60 ran east from Nelson 7 miles (11 km) to the Colorado River. Both the northwest and eastern legs of the route were completely paved by 1951.

State Route 60 remained largely unchanged until the Nevada began renumbering of its state highway system on July 1, 1976. The northwest leg of old SR 60 was renumbered to State Route 165 in this process, and by this time was realigned to be only 12 miles (19 km) long. The remaining legs of SR 60 have since gone unnumbered.

== Major intersections ==
The entire route is in Clark County.

Location	mi	km	Destinations	Notes
Boulder City	0.000	0.000	US 95 – Las Vegas, Needles	Western terminus
Nelson	11.023	17.740	Western Street	Eastern terminus
Nelson	11.023	17.740	Nelson Road east	Continuation beyond eastern terminus; former SR 60 east
1.000 mi = 1.609 km; 1.000 km = 0.621 mi
