= Colorado Mining District (New Mexico Territory) =

Colorado Mining District was primarily a silver and gold mining district organized in El Dorado Canyon, New Mexico Territory on the west shore of the Colorado River in what is now Clark County, Nevada. The Colorado District was part of Arizona Territory from 1863 to 1869. In 1869, the land of Arizona Territory north and west of the Colorado River east to the 114th meridian of longitude, including the Colorado District, was turned over to Nevada.

== History ==
The Colorado District had been organized by at least June 1, 1862. At a District meeting organized on January 8, 1863, officers were elected including a Mr. Lewis to fill an unexpired term as recorder that had begun on June 1, 1862. There were 611 locations recorded at the end of 1863.

El Dorado City was the site of the El Dorado Mills or Colorado Mills, first stamp mill in the canyon, at the mouth of January Wash at its confluence with El Dorado Canyon, about a mile down the canyon from Huse Spring. Its site was located nearby to the south southeast of the Techatticup Mine the primary source of the ore its mill processed. In late 1863, the mill made with parts of abandoned or closed mills brought in from California was completed. Col. James Russell Vineyard at the time a State Senator from Los Angeles began the mill, to process the ore of the district mines cut out the cost of shipping the ore down the Colorado River by steamboat, and by sea to San Francisco for processing, thus cutting costs in half for those mine owners.
