= Techatticup Mine =

Gold mine in Nevada, United States

Coordinates: 35°42′37″N 114°48′22″W

Techatticup Mine is a former gold mine, now a tourist attraction. It is located at an elevation of 2,477 feet (755 m), midway in El Dorado Canyon, in Clark County, Nevada.

== History ==
The mine's vein was discovered by the Spanish during the 1700s, but its exploitation began during the mid-1800s mining boom. It was in operation from 1861 to 1942.

The Techatticup Mine was the largest and most productive mine in the Colorado Mining District. The mining camps of Alturas and Louisville were located near this mine, midway down the canyon.

== Today ==
The mine has been cleaned up and illuminated, and guided tours can be taken through the mine. Much of the old mining equipment is still to be seen there. A highlight of the tour is where it passes through an example of drift mining, its long, deep drift cut downward from the top through the mountain where its lode of ore was located.
