= Twin Arrows, Arizona =

Ghost town in Arizona, US

Twin Arrows
- Town
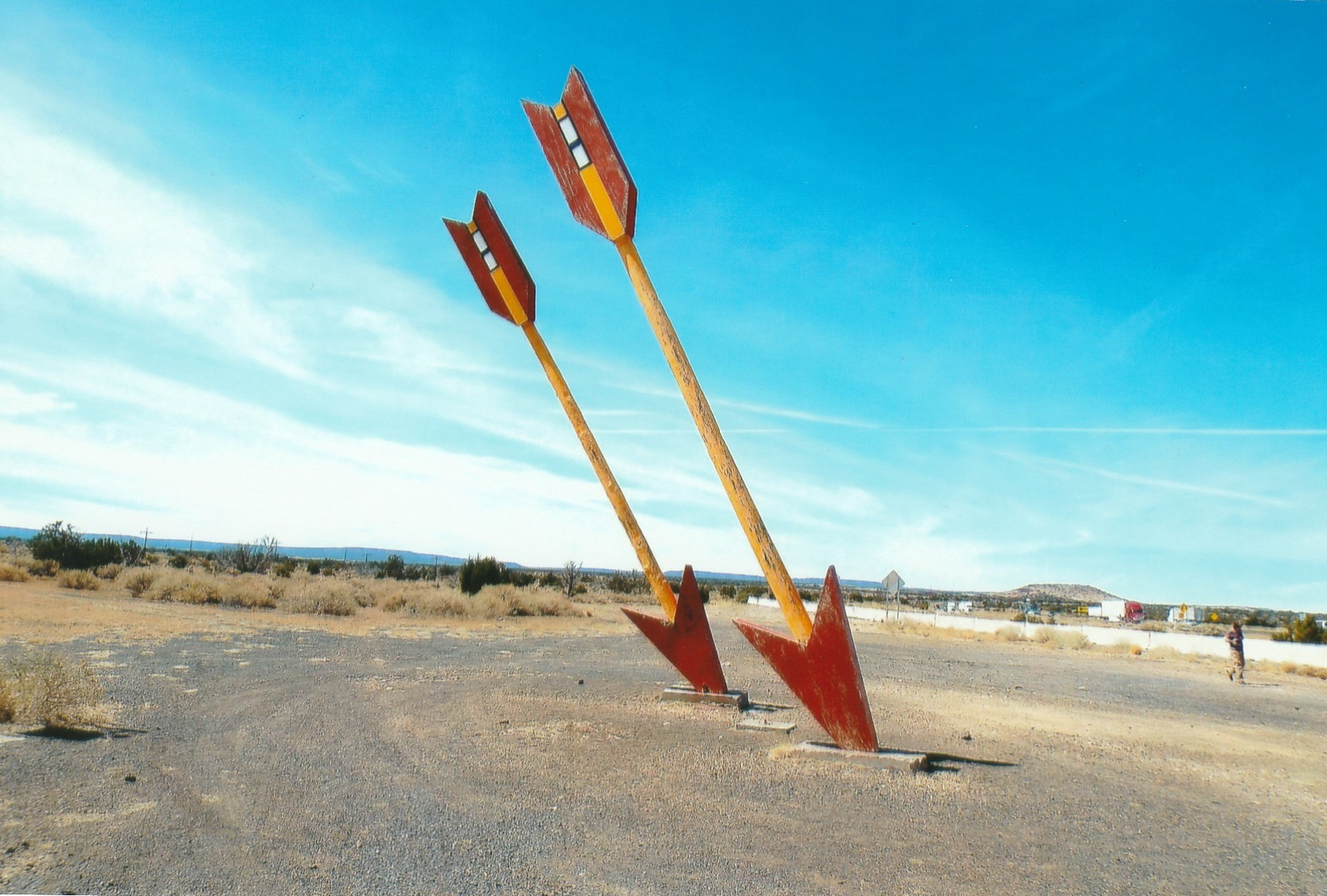
- Twin Arrows
- Interactive map of Twin Arrows
- Coordinates: 35°09′40″N 111°16′46″W
- Country: United States
- State: Arizona
- County: Coconino

Twin Arrows is a ghost town located in the central part of Arizona on U.S. Route 66 (US 66) in Coconino County between the city of Flagstaff and the town of Winslow.

== History ==
The area in which Twin Arrows is located was inhabited by the Hopi and Navajo tribes. The Navajo fought against the Apaches in the area. The first settlers of European descent to arrive in the area were the Spanish conquistadores. The area became part of Mexico when Mexico gained its independence from Spain.

The United States and Mexico fought in what is known as the Mexican–American War. The war ended officially when Mexico capitulated and the 1848 Treaty of Guadalupe Hidalgo was signed with the Mexican government. It specified its major consequence, the Mexican Cession of the northern territories of Alta California and Santa Fe de Nuevo México to the United States.

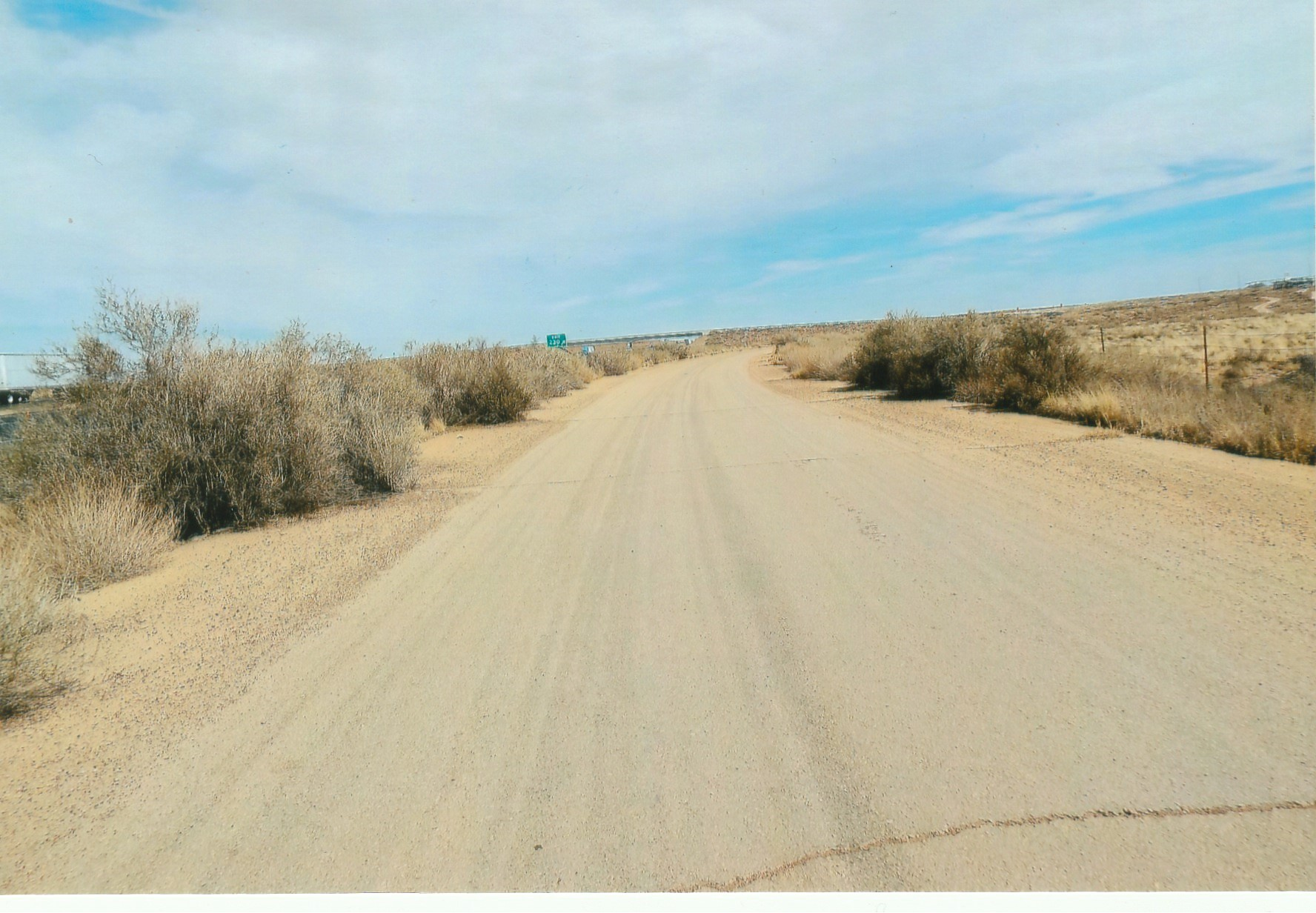
Old US 66 in Twin Arrows

Wagon routes between Flagstaff and Winslow were surveyed in the 1880s. The Atlantic and Pacific Railroad choose to build the railroad along it. The railway passed to the north of the modern alignment of the National Old Trails which would in 1926 become US 66. US 66 served as a major path for those who migrated west during the Dust Bowl of the 1930s. The road supported the economies of the communities through which it passed.

Traffic began to flow through the Twin Arrows area because Route 66 was aligned along the National Old Trails Road. A business named the Canyon Padre Trading Post, named for the gorge that cuts nearby, was established in the late 1940s in Twin Arrows. Business was slow for the store and diner until the owners changed its name to "Twin Arrows Trading Post," inspired by the nearby town of Two Guns, and added a service station. Two 25-foot (7.6 m) giant arrows which were placed on the property were easily recognized by traveling motorists and the business began to flourish. In early 2022, one of the two arrows broke at the base; as of 2023 it remains on the ground next to its surviving partner.

=== Decline ===
The Twin Arrows Trading Post began to fail with the construction of Interstate 40 (I-40), because motorists no longer had to take US 66. Business for the Twin Arrows Trading Post began to decline and it was not long before the store/diner/service station/gift shop passed through the hands of various owners. This continued until 1995, when it was finally closed and abandoned.

The land where Twin Arrows is located is in the Navajo and Hopi reservations but, contrary to popular conception, is not owned by the Hopi tribe. The Hopi owns the buildings but the land belongs to the state of Arizona. In 2013, the Twin Arrows Navajo Gaming Casino opened to the north of the trading post site. The twin arrows sculpture, which is pictured, is featured on the album art of the musical album "Man Mountain" by Blue States.

Due to high winds, one of the arrows appears to have fallen and been removed some time between February 15 and 22 2022. The foot plate and wooden footing still stand but the second arrow is no longer there.

== Images ==
Twin Arrows, Arizona
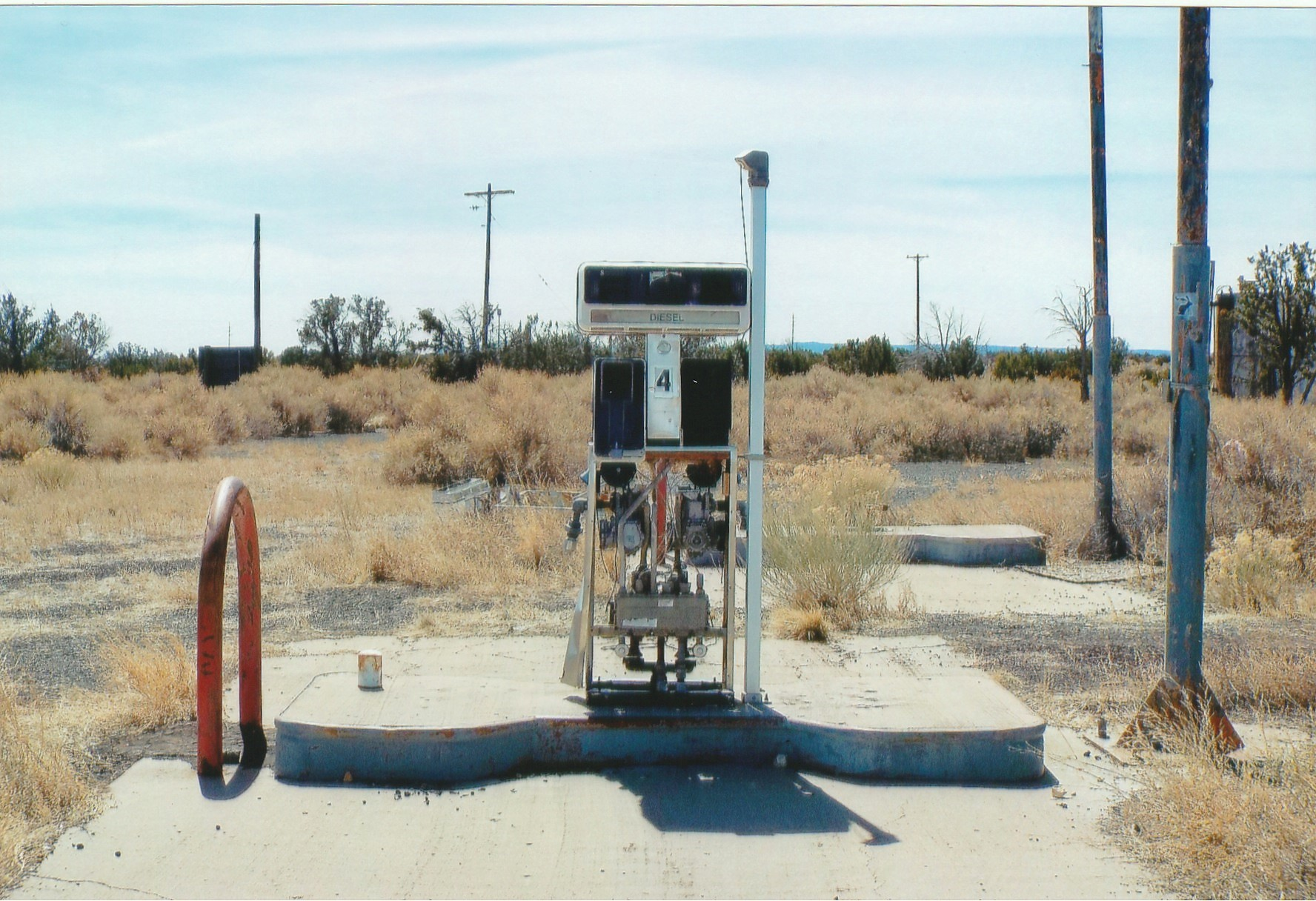
Old gas pump on US 66

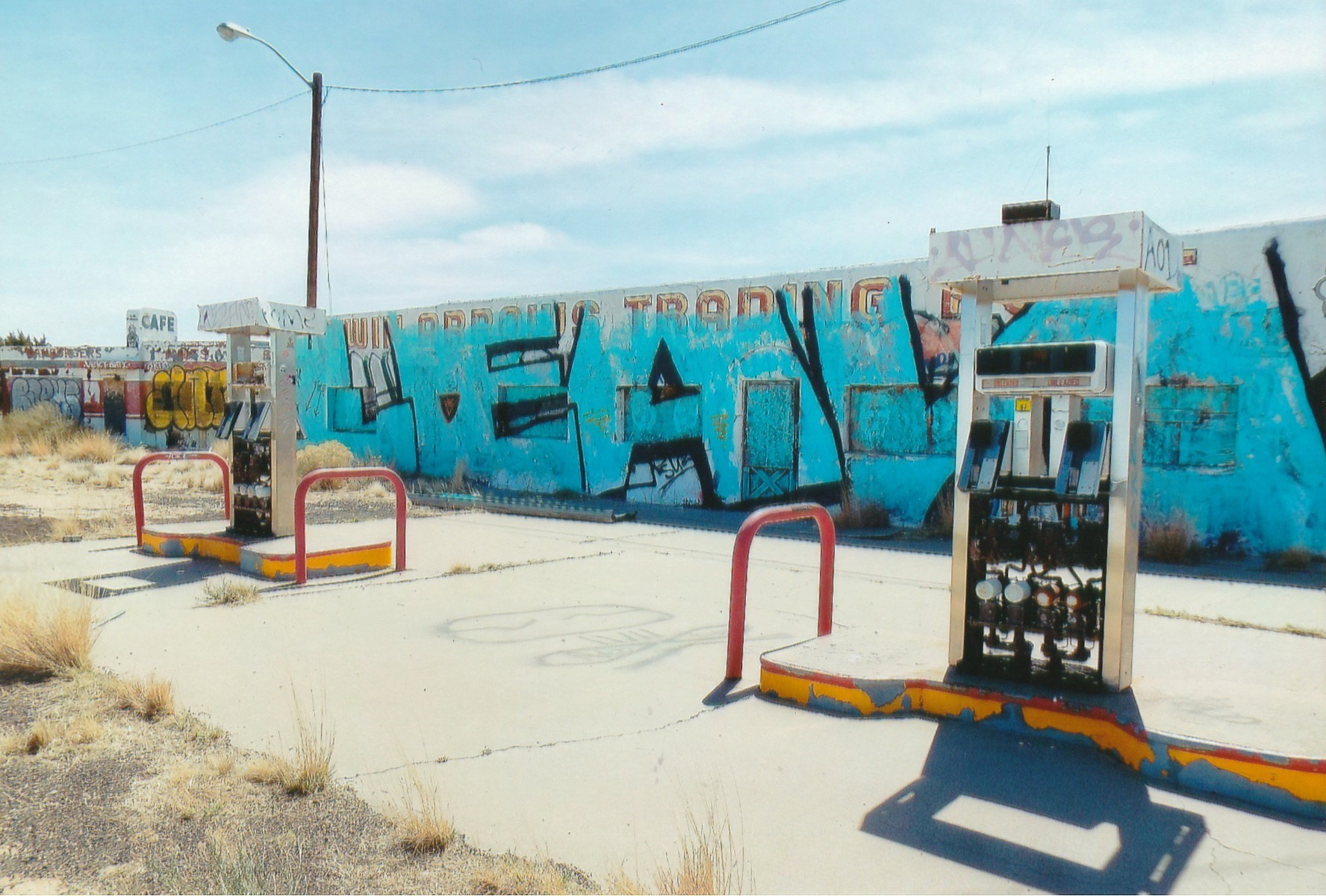
Abandoned Twin Arrows Trading Post

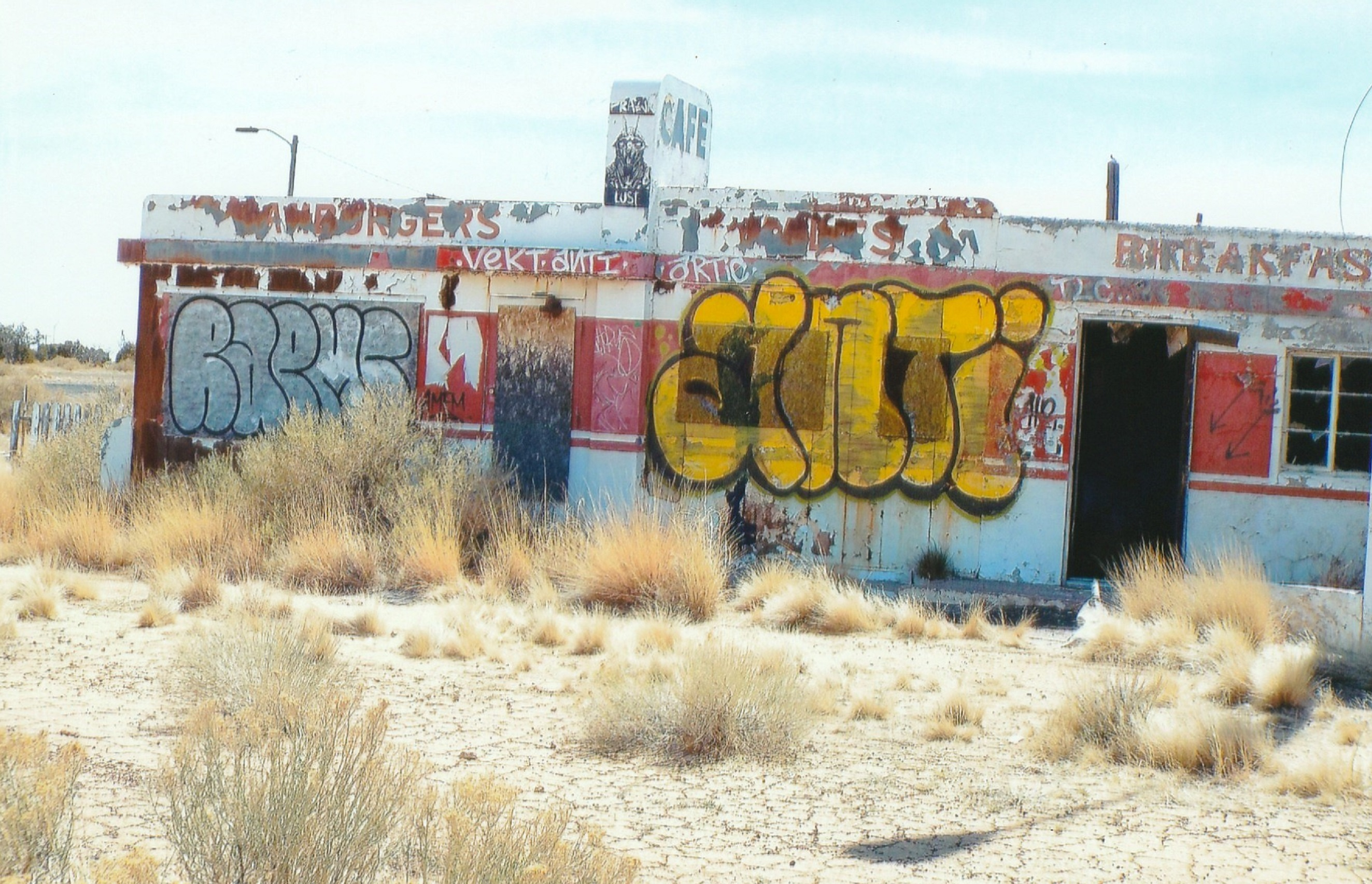
Abandoned diner in Twin Arrows

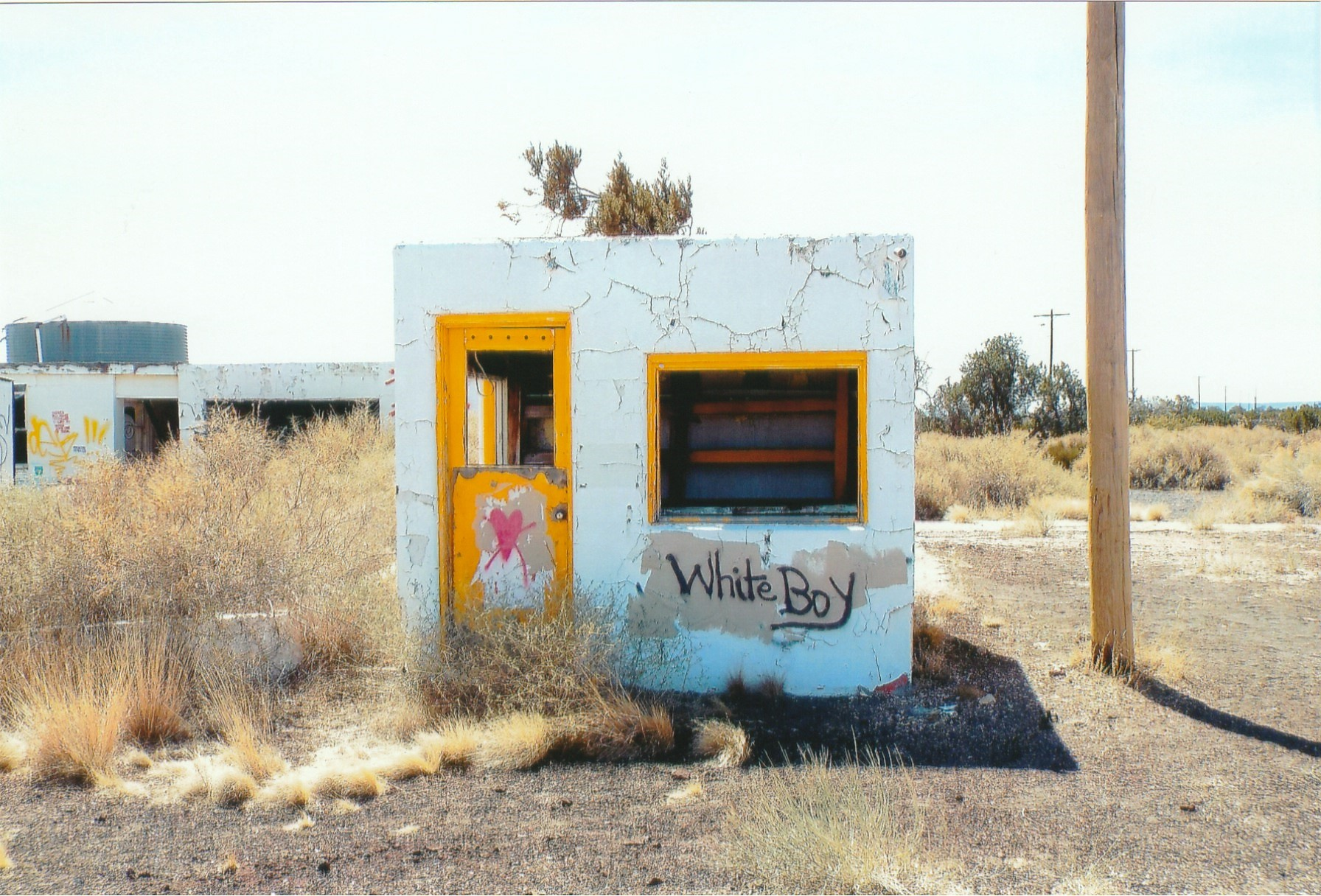
Structure in Twin Arrows

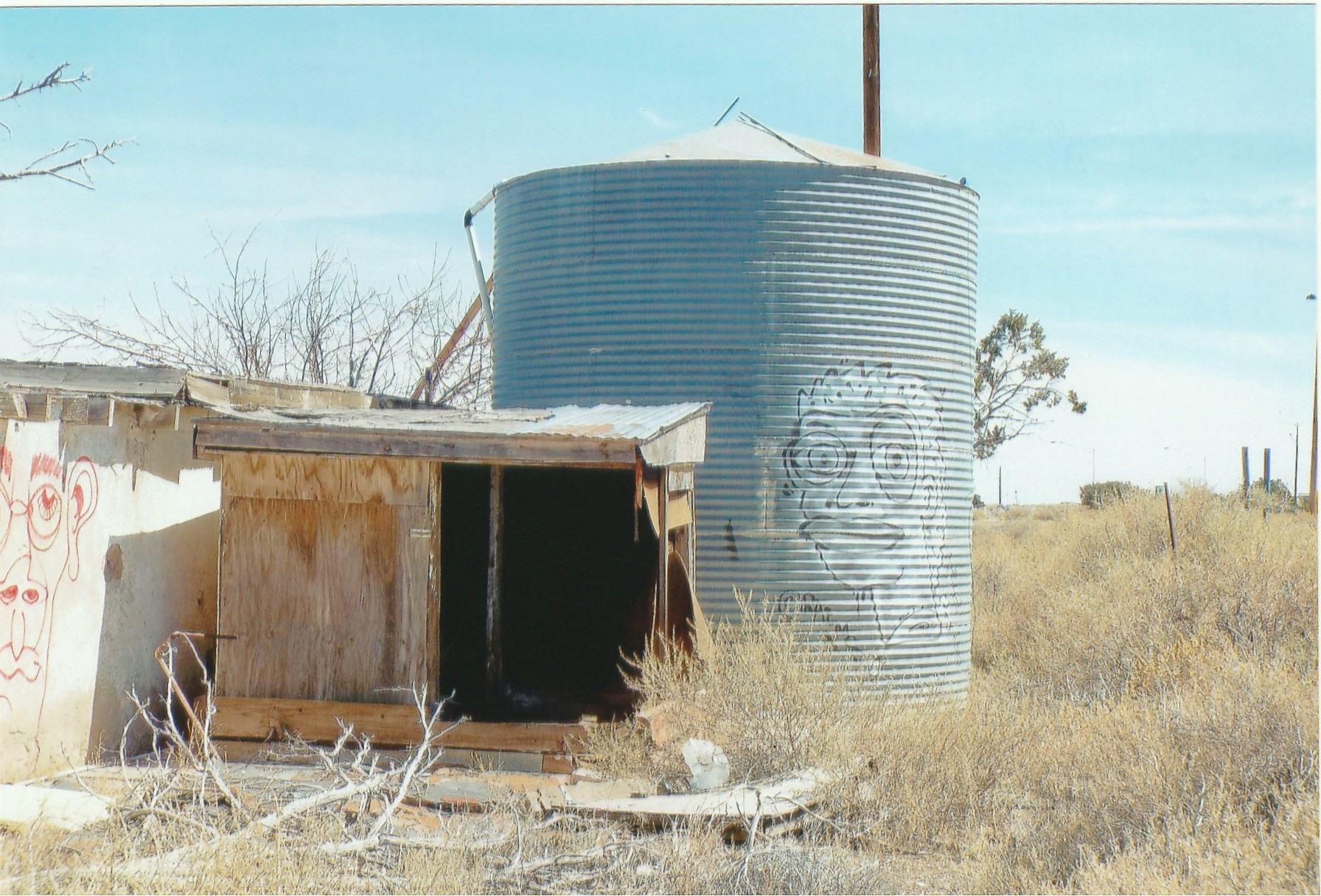
Tank behind the abandoned Twin Arrows Trading Post

== See also ==
- Gillett, Arizona
