= Canyon Diablo shootout =

1905 gunfight in Arizona

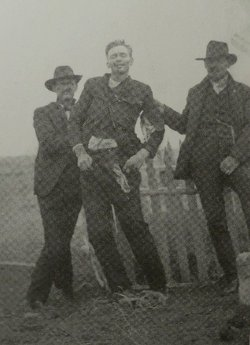
- Cowboys holding up the corpse of John Shaw on April 10, 1905.
- Date: April 8, 1905
- Location: Canyon Diablo, Arizona Territory, US
- Outcome: 1 killed 2 wounded

The Canyon Diablo shootout was a gunfight between American lawmen and a pair of bandits that occurred on April 8, 1905, in the present-day ghost town of Canyon Diablo, Arizona. On the night before, two men named William Evans and John Shaw robbed a saloon in Winslow and made off with at least $200 in coins. Two lawmen pursued the bandits and on the following day they encountered each other in Canyon Diablo. A three-second shootout ensued, which was described at the time as "one huge explosion" that resulted in the death of Shaw and the wounding and capture of Evans.

== Background ==
Little is known about the lives of William Evans and John Shaw before they became bandits. The former was an ex-convict who also went by the name of William Smith, or Smythe. Both were in their early to mid twenties when they decided that banditry would be easier than being a cowboy. The robbery which ultimately led to the shooting in Canyon Diablo occurred on the night of April 7, 1905. Shortly before midnight, Evans and Shaw entered the Wigwam Saloon in Winslow, Arizona. The two ordered whiskey at the bar before pulling out their revolvers to hold up a group of seven men playing poker nearby. At gunpoint, the two bandits stole between $200 and $600 worth of silver coins and departed without firing a shot.

Pete Pemberton, the deputy sheriff of Navajo County, and owner of the saloon, was notified, who then informed his superior, Sheriff Chet Houck. Pemberton and the city marshal, Bob Giles, found a trail of silver coins along the railroad tracks leading toward Flagstaff. It was assumed the bandits boarded a moving train to make their escape. From Holbrook, Sheriff Houck boarded a train to Flagstaff, where he met Pemberton and began their investigation. After finding neither the bandits or any relevant information, they boarded a return train to Winslow. On the ride back the lawmen received word that two suspicious-looking men had been seen hiding in the bushes along the railroad tracks, near the turn to Canyon Diablo.

The town of Canyon Diablo was located about twenty-five miles west of Winslow, next to the gorge Canyon Diablo and the border of the Navajo Reservation. It was nearly a ghost town in 1905, with only a small population. The two lawmen had the train stopped a couple of miles past the town and then got off to walk back on foot, arriving in Canyon Diablo near sunset.

== Shootout ==
Sheriff Houck and Pemberton made contact with Fred Volz, owner of a small store where he traded with the Navajo and Hopi. Volz told the lawmen that earlier in the day there had been two well-dressed men standing outside the trading post for a long time, behaving suspiciously. Soon after receiving this information, Evans and Shaw turned the corner near the trading post and were spotted walking the opposite way, towards the train depot. Pemberton and Houck followed the thieves. When they were about six to eight feet apart, Houck called for them to submit to a search, to which they refused. The two pairs briefly stood face-to-face, each man eventually going for his sidearm. They began shooting at point blank range, with Sheriff Houck advancing forward.

Shaw was struck in the head by one of Houck's bullets, while Pemberton wounded Evans in the leg and shoulder, causing him to drop his weapon. A bullet went through Houck's coat on the left side, grazing him across the stomach, then exited through the right side of the garment. Shaw was dead and Evans was badly wounded. Sheriff Houck, Shaw and Evans each fired all of their bullets, making for a total of twenty-one shots fired in seconds of the encounter.

== Aftermath ==
After the shootout, Sheriff Houck had the body of Shaw placed in a pine wood coffin, provided by Volz, and buried in a shallow grave. Evans was taken to the hospital in Winslow, where he recovered, later sent to Yuma Territorial Prison for nine years. $271 worth of silver coins were found in their possession. On the night after the shooting, a group of cowboys, once employed by the Aztec Land & Cattle Company, were at the Wigwam Saloon. Hearing of the news, and how both Evans and Shaw failed to drink their whiskey shots the night before, they decided to travel to Canyon Diablo to exhume Shaw's corpse for one final drink.

The men boarded a train to Canyon Diablo, having a few drinks at the train station before borrowing shovels from Fred Volz to dig up Shaw's coffin. Volz was hesitant, but eventually gave in to the drunken group and provided shovels, as well as a Kodak camera. According to varying accounts, Volz either wanted pictures for proof to collect reward money, as he was connected to the demise of the outlaws, or they were taken for posterity. Shaw's coffin was opened and the cowboys had his body leaned against the picket fence surrounding another grave. Shaw appeared to be smiling. After giving Shaw "a plentiful gulp of whiskey", taking a few pictures, and saying some prayers, his body was replaced in the coffin with a half-empty bottle and returned to the grave.

The pictures were displayed on the walls of the Wigwam Saloon in Winslow until the 1940s when the building was torn down. By that time, the ghost town of Canyon Diablo was reopened and renamed Two Guns.

On October 28, 1905, seven months after the shooting in Canyon Diablo, Deputy Pemberton drunkenly shot and killed Winslow Town Marshal Bob Giles during a dispute in the Wigwam Saloon. Pemberton was arrested and found guilty, but he was acquitted after serving only a small fraction of his twenty-five year sentence.

== See also ==
- List of Old West gunfights
