= Canyon Diablo, Arizona =

Ghost town in Coconino County, Arizona

- Ghost town
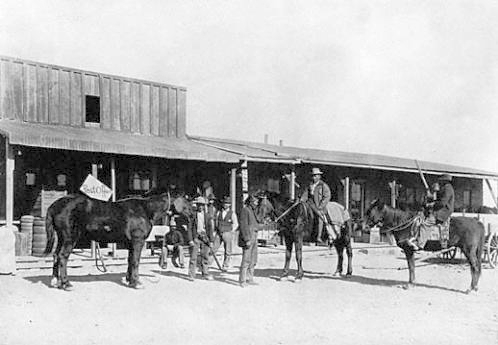
- Canyon Diablo in its heyday, c. 1890

- Location within Arizona Location within the United States
- Coordinates: 35°09′46″N 111°07′04″WCanyon Diablo
- Country: United States
- State: Arizona
- County: Coconino
- Elevation: 5,433 ft (1,656 m)
- Time zone: UTC-7 (MST (no DST))

Canyon Diablo is a ghost town in Coconino County, Arizona, United States, on the edge of the arroyo Canyon Diablo. The community was settled in 1880 to supply workers building a transcontinental railroad and died out in the early 20th century. The town, which is about 12 mi (19 km) northwest of Meteor Crater, was at the time the closest post office to the crater when a meteorite fragment was studied and named in 1891.

== History ==
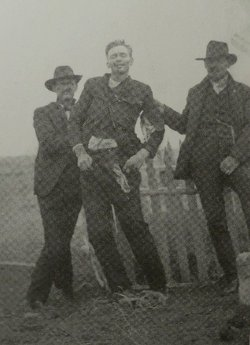
Cowboys hold up the corpse of outlaw John Shaw, who died in the Canyon Diablo shootout, 1905.

The ramshackle camp of railroad workers originated in 1880, due to the construction of the Atlantic and Pacific Railroad bridge over a large canyon named Canyon Diablo. The bridge construction took six months. Many regular railroad construction workers were encamped and waiting to recommence their work once the canyon had been spanned. After the bridge was completed, construction resumed and the camp was largely abandoned.

Construction of the railroad normally involved a constantly moving work area. The completed rail was used to transport materials and workers to the next line. The bed was then graded, small bridges were built, and the rail laid down. The workers would camp in tents spread out along the work area depending on the jobs they performed. However, when very large rivers or canyons were encountered, construction of specialized bridges would slow down or stop. This resulted in a larger temporary camp or community springing up as the idle workers consolidated together in one place near where the bridge was being constructed.

The original pillars the bridge was mounted on were excavated from the surrounding Kaibab Limestone and shaped on site by Italian stonemasons. The ruins of the lodgings of the railroad workmen are on the west end of the bridge site. Although the railroad ended at the edge of the canyon, work on the railroad route still progressed. Crews were sent ahead to survey the route, prepare the grade and bed, cut and pre-stage railroad ties and other supplies in advance of the iron rails that would accompany the trains once the canyon was spanned when the new bridge arrived. Work quickly progressed until the A&P crew linked up with the Southern Pacific Railroad crews at Needles, California on August 9, 1883.

Within a short time the town had 2,000 residents. A regular stagecoach route from Flagstaff to Canyon Diablo began running and was often the victim of robberies. Hermann Wolf (1830-1899), a Prussian immigrant, ran a trading post at "Wolf Crossing" on the Little Colorado River about 12 miles north of Leupp, Arizona and near a place called Tolchaco. Wolf died there and his body was transported to Canyon Diablo for burial. Currently Wolf's grave is heavily monumented and the story is that after World War II a relative from Germany found his grave and installed the headstone and other improvements on the grave site.

When the railroad bridge was completed, the town quickly died. The original railroad bridge was replaced in 1900 with a new bridge to carry heavier locomotives and cars. By 1903, the only thing remaining in the town was a Navajo trading post run by Fred Volzs until about 1906. A new double track railroad bridge was completed across the Canyon in 1947. What remains today at Canyon Diablo are a few building foundations, the grave marker and grave of Hermann Wolf, the ruins of Volzs' trading post, a railroad siding and a double track railroad bridge.

Canyon Diablo's population was 30 in 1890, 29 in 1900, and 36 in 1920.

== Access ==
Access to Canyon Diablo is north on a very poor road from Exit 230/Two Guns off Interstate 40. A high ground clearance vehicle is recommended.

== See also ==
- Canyon Diablo (canyon)
- Canyon Diablo Shootout
