= Topeka Bridge & Iron Co. =

Bridge company in the United States

Topeka Bridge & Iron Co. was a bridge company. Its works include many bridges that are now listed on the U.S. National Register of Historic Places. Its Canyon Diablo Bridge was a concrete Luten arch bridge built in 1914. Its Amelia Park Bridge, for another example, was built in 1914.

A state of Arizona study asserts that "All of the concrete Luten arches identified in Arizona are associated directly-either through engineering or construction-with the [firm], the western representative of Indianapolis-based engineer Daniel B. Luten." For the Inspiration Bridge in Miami, Arizona, the town engineer built the bridge in 1921, and then four others exactly like it, from plans and specifications ordered from the Topeka Bridge & Iron Co. The Topeka Bridge & Iron firm "also sent moulds with which to cast the decorative concrete balusters for the guardrails."

Works (attribution) include:

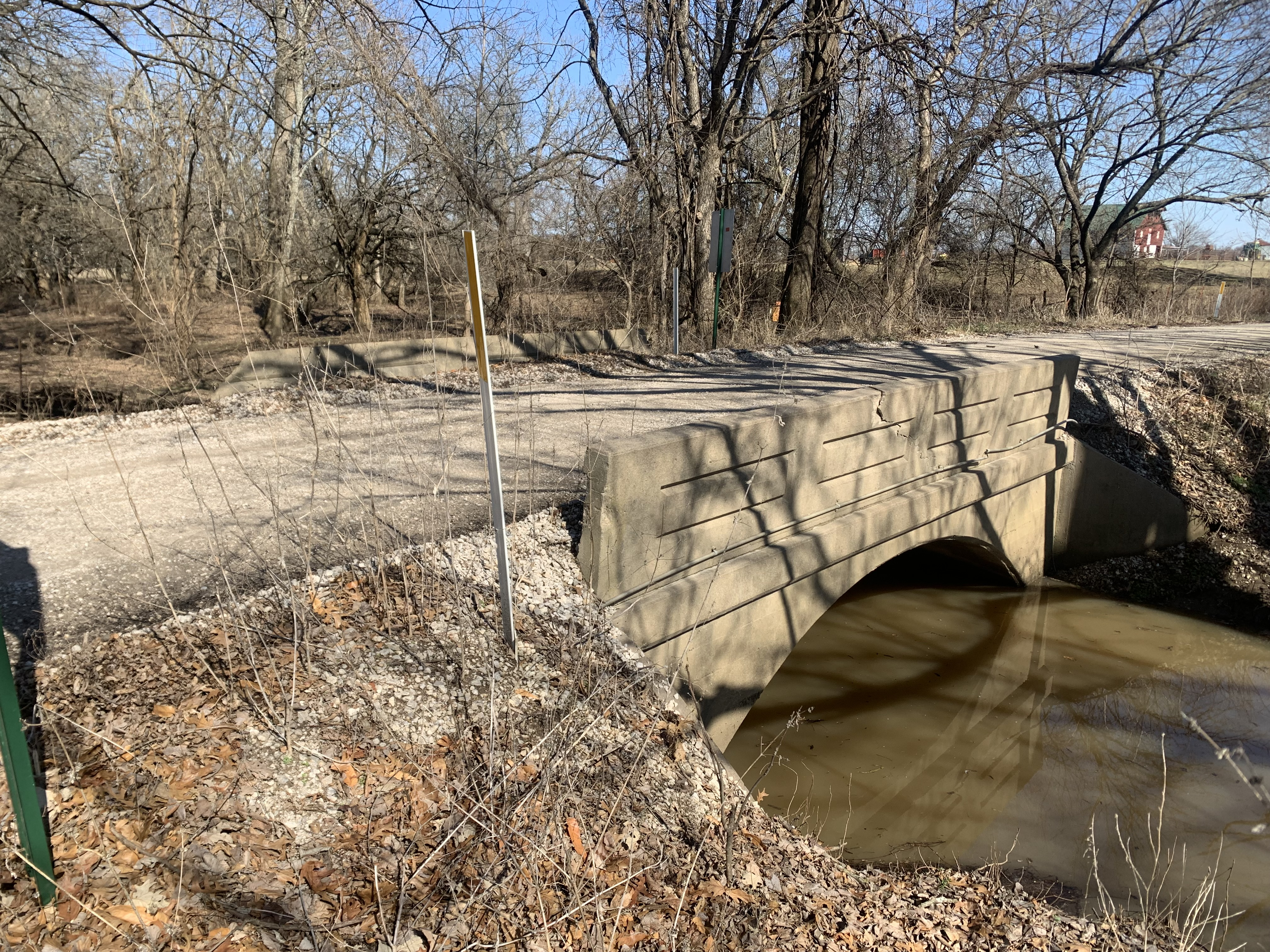
Labette Creek tributary bridge in Walton Township, Labette County, Kansas

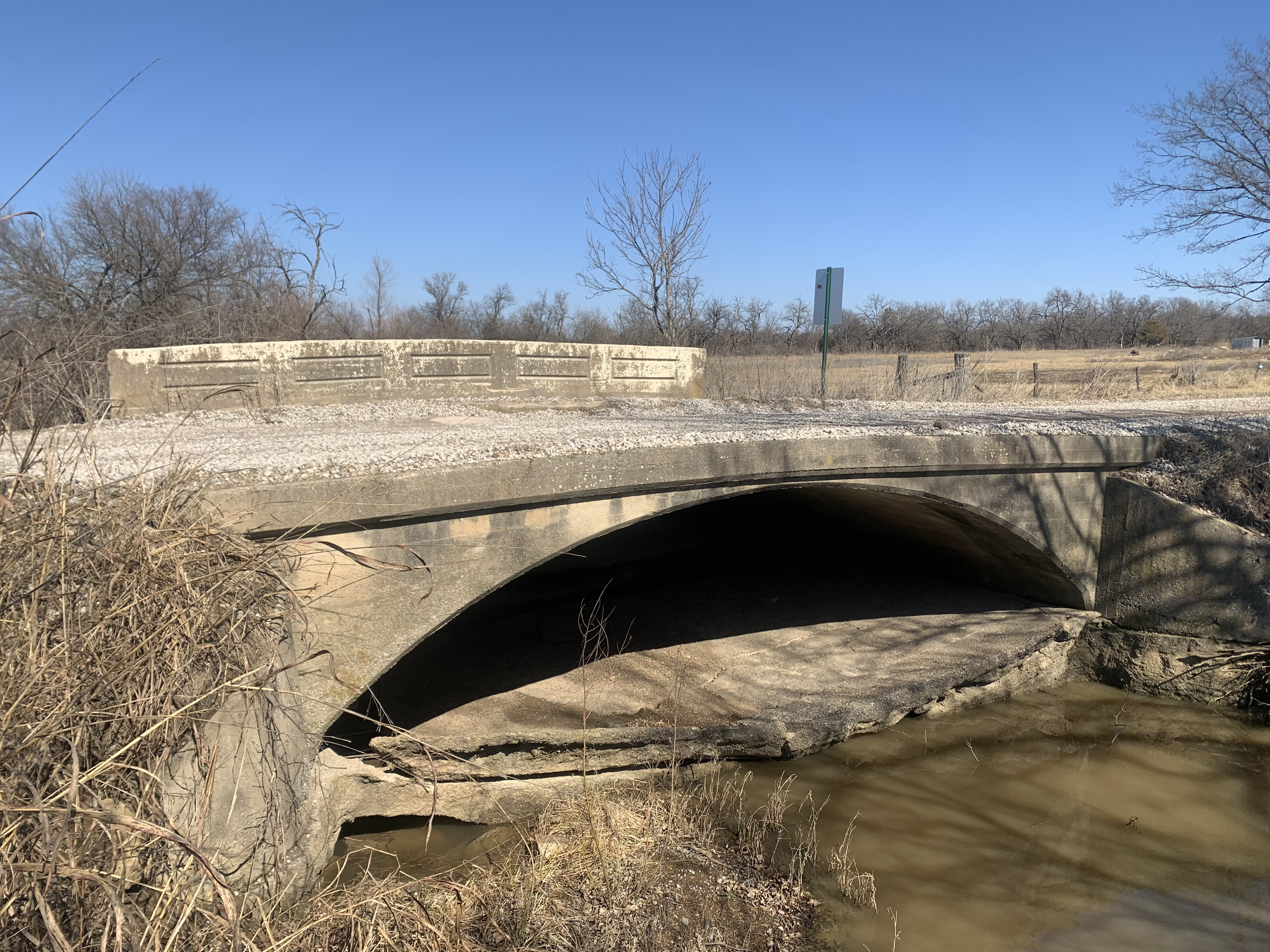
Pumpkin Creek tributary bridge west of Mound Valley, Kansas

- Amelia Park Bridge, built 1914, 0.5 mi. W of US 77 on Cty Rd. 260th. Approx 1 mi. NE of Antelope, Antelope, KS (Topeka Bridge and Iron Co.), NRHP-listed
- Canyon Diablo Bridge, Abandoned grade of US 66 over Diablo Canyon, Winona, AZ (Topeka Bridge & Iron Co.), NRHP-listed
- Canyon Padre Bridge, Abandoned grade of US 66 over Padre Canyon, Flagstaff, AZ (Topeka Bridge & Iron Co.), NRHP-listed
- Cordova Avenue Bridge, Cordova Ave. over Bloody Tanks Wash, Miami, AZ (Topeka Bridge & Iron Co.), NRHP-listed
- Gila River Bridge, Old Safford Rd., 6.8 mi. SE of Clifton, AZ (Topeka Bridge & Iron Co.), NRHP-listed
- Harris Bridge, 3 mi. N and 4 mi. W of Americus, KS (Topeka Bridge & Iron), NRHP-listed
- Holbrook Bridge, Abandoned grade of US 70 over the Little Colorado River, 4.2 mi. SE of Holbrook, AZ (Topeka Bridge & Iron Co.), NRHP-listed
- Hudgeon Bridge, 10 mi. S and 3.2 mi. W of Girard, KS (Topeka Bridge & Construction Co.), NRHP-listed
- Inspiration Avenue Bridge, Inspiration Ave. over Bloody Tanks Wash, Miami, AZ (Topeka Bridge & Iron Co.), NRHP-listed
- Jake's Branch of Middle Creek Bridge, Off US 69, Louisburg, KS (Topeka Bridge & Iron), NRHP-listed
- Keystone Avenue Bridge, Keystone Ave. over Bloody Tanks Wash, Miami, AZ (Topeka Bridge & Iron Co.), NRHP-listed
- Labette Creek Tributary Bridge, Off US 160 2.3 mi. W of Parsons, KS (Topeka Bridge & Iron), NRHP-listed
- Maxwell's Slough Bridge, Off KS 57 .5 mi. W and 1 mi. S of St. Paul, KS (Topeka Bridge & Construction), NRHP-listed
- McCauley Bridge, 0.5 mi. S of Auburn, KS (Topeka Bridge & Iron), NRHP-listed
- Miami Avenue Bridge, Miami Ave. over Bloody Tanks Wash, Miami, AZ (Topeka Bridge & Iron Co.), NRHP-listed
- Mineral Creek Bridge, Old US 77 over Mineral Creek, Kelvin, AZ (Topeka Bridge & Iron Co.), NRHP-listed
- Parsons Filled Arch Bridge, Off US 160, 1 mi. E and 1.2 mi. S of Parsons, KS (Topeka Bridge & Iron), NRHP-listed
- Pumpkin Creek Tributary Bridge, Off KS 22 2 mi. W of Mound Valley, KS (Topeka Bridge & Iron), NRHP-listed
- Queen Creek Bridge, Old Florence Hwy. over Queen Creek, Florence Junction, AZ (Topeka Bridge & Iron Co.), NRHP-listed
- Reppy Avenue Bridge, Reppy Ave. over Bloody Tanks Wash, Miami, AZ (Topeka Bridge & Arch Co.), NRHP-listed
- Walnut Creek Bridge, Off KS 33 1 mi. S of Wellsville, KS (Topeka Bridge & Iron), NRHP-listed
