= Gila River Bridge =

Bridge near Clifton, Arizona

- U.S. National Register of Historic Places
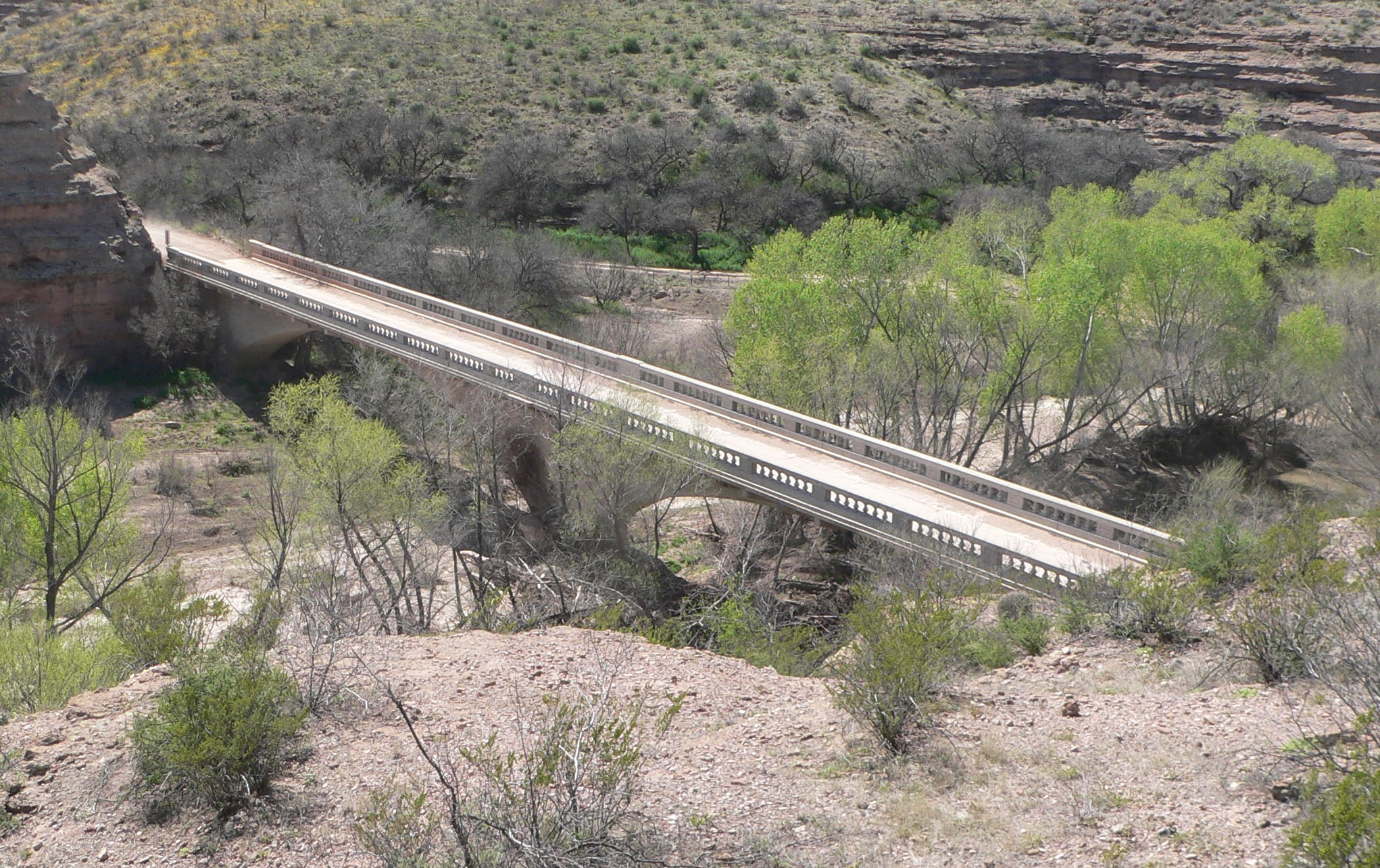
- Bridge in 2015

- Location within Arizona
- Location: Old Safford Rd., 6.8 miles southeast of Clifton, Arizona
- Coordinates: 32.965251°N 109.308987°W
- Area: 0.1 acres (0.040 ha)
- Built: 1918
- Built by: Leeson, R.V.; Topeka Bridge & Iron Co.
- Architectural style: Luten Arch bridge
- MPS: Vehicular Bridges in Arizona MPS
- NRHP reference No.: 88001628
- Added to NRHP: September 30, 1988

The Gila River Bridge near Clifton, Arizona, also known as the Clifton Bridge, is a Luten Arch bridge which was built in 1918. It was listed on the National Register of Historic Places in 1988.

It is a two-span Luten arch reinforced concrete bridge which was ordered by Arizona state engineer B.M. Atwood. A Luten arch is a bridge design created by Daniel B. Luten, which is widely regarded as elegant in appearance.

A longer, higher steel deck arch bridge was planned in 1917 by Arizona state engineer Thomas Haddock, but bids came in high over budget, and steel was relatively unavailable at the time (during World War I), so that approach was dropped. Secondly, R.V. Leeson, the Assistant Chief Engineer of the Topeka Bridge and Iron Company, was hired to design a long open spandrel arch bridge with concrete girder approaches. But instead of that, a new state engineer, B.M. Atwood, required the design to become two equal-span Luten arches, at a lower and shorter crossing. This design was constructed by a convict work force at cost of $60,191 in 1918.

If it had been built to the state engineer's plan for a single-span concrete arch bridge, it would have been one of the longest such in the United States.

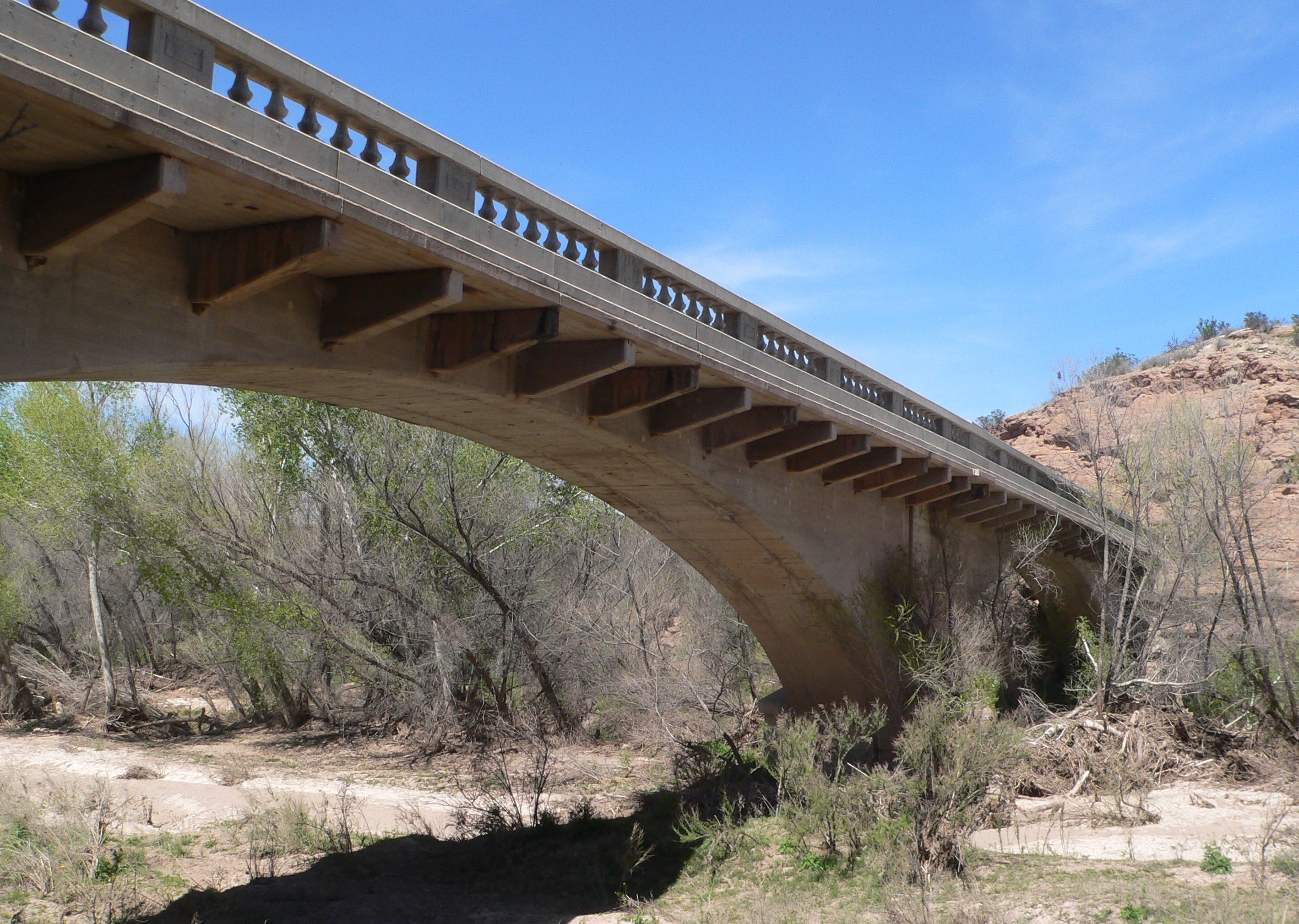
Detail of one of the two equal-length spans

It still carries traffic on the Black Hills Back Country Byway, also known as Old Safford Road. The Owl Creek Campground on the byway has seven campsites upon a cliff overlooking the bridge. A small picnic area is on the north end of the bridge; the south end is a launch site for floating the river and is a catfish fishing site.
