= Canyon Diablo (canyon) =

Canyon in Arizona, US

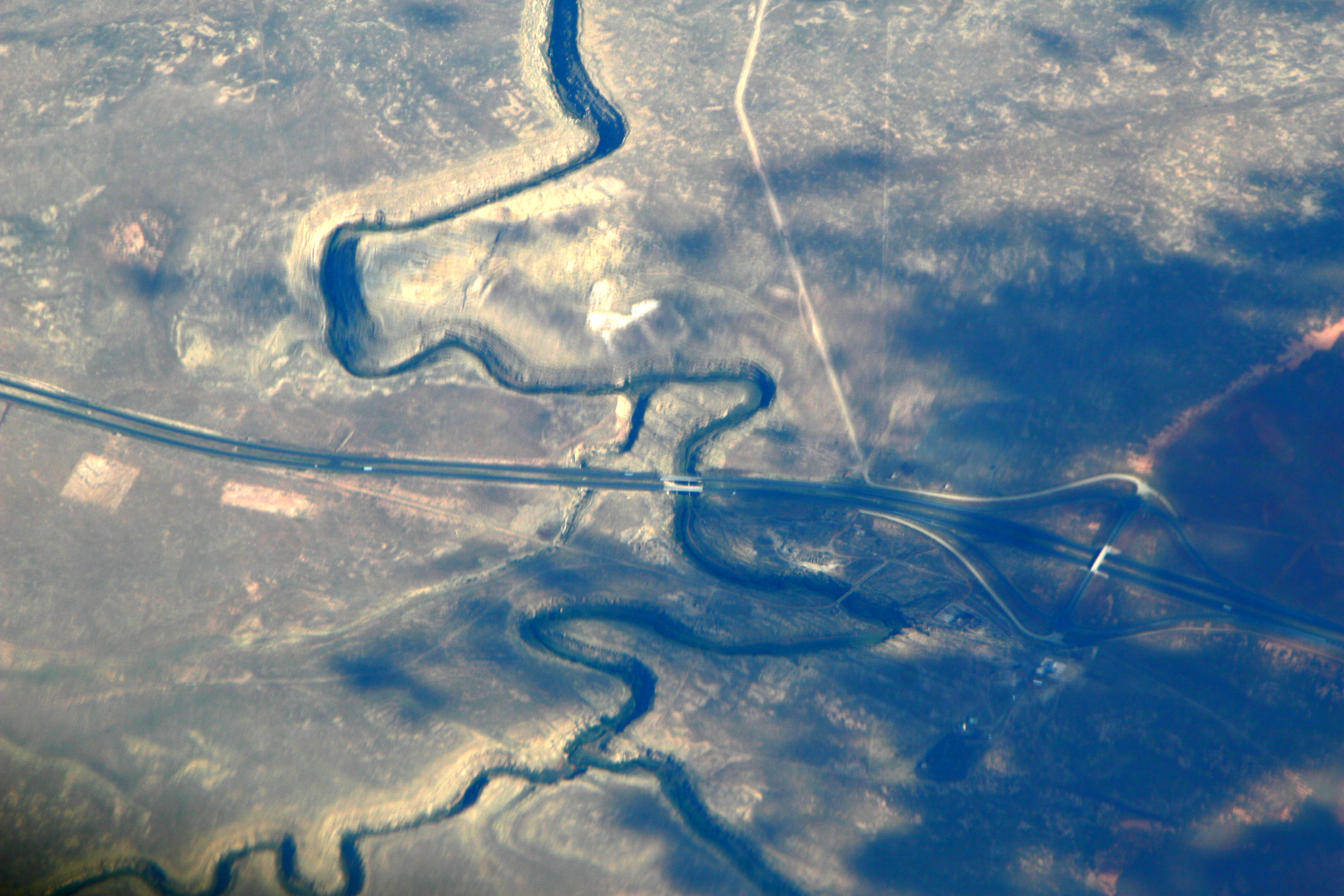
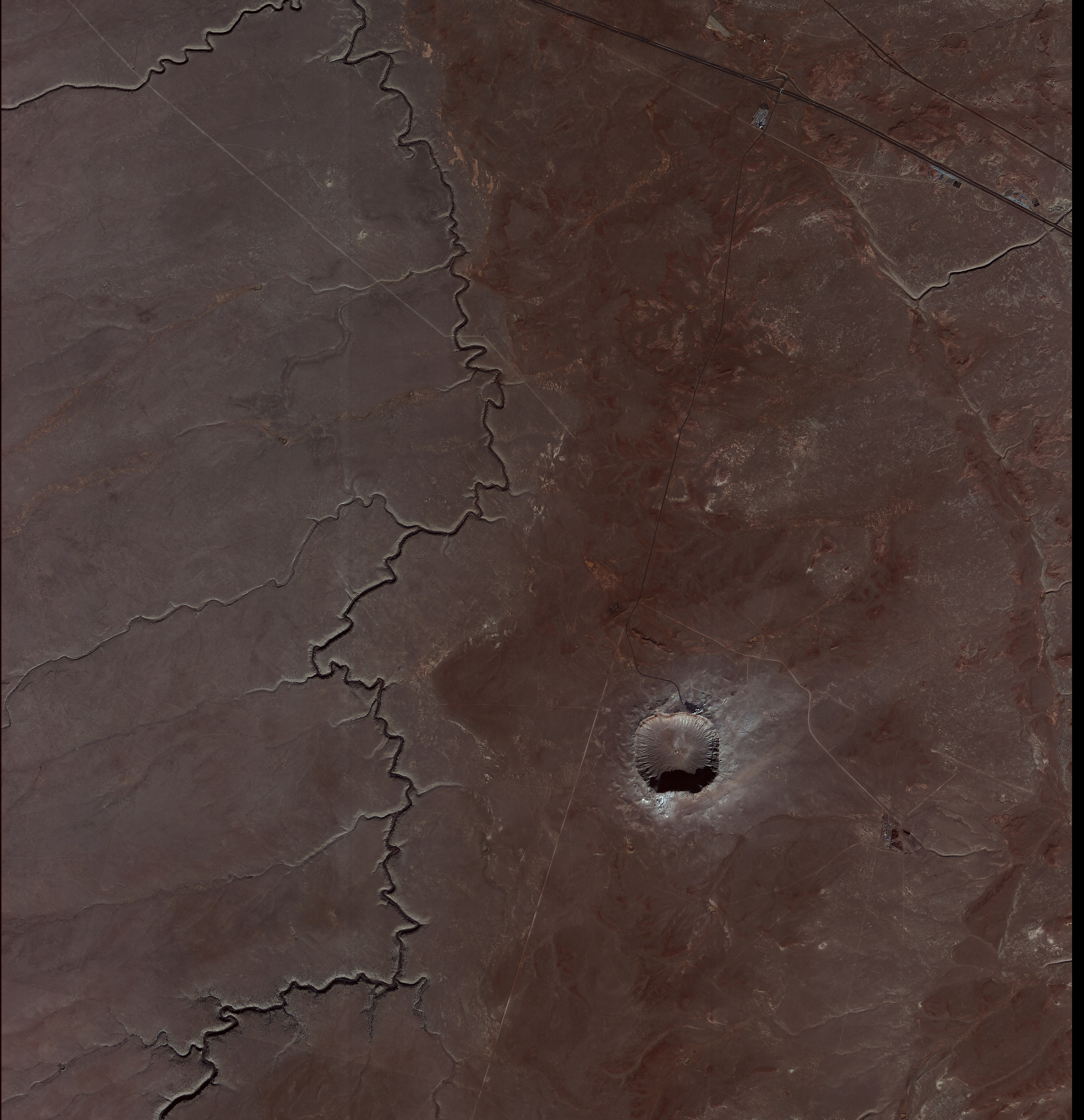
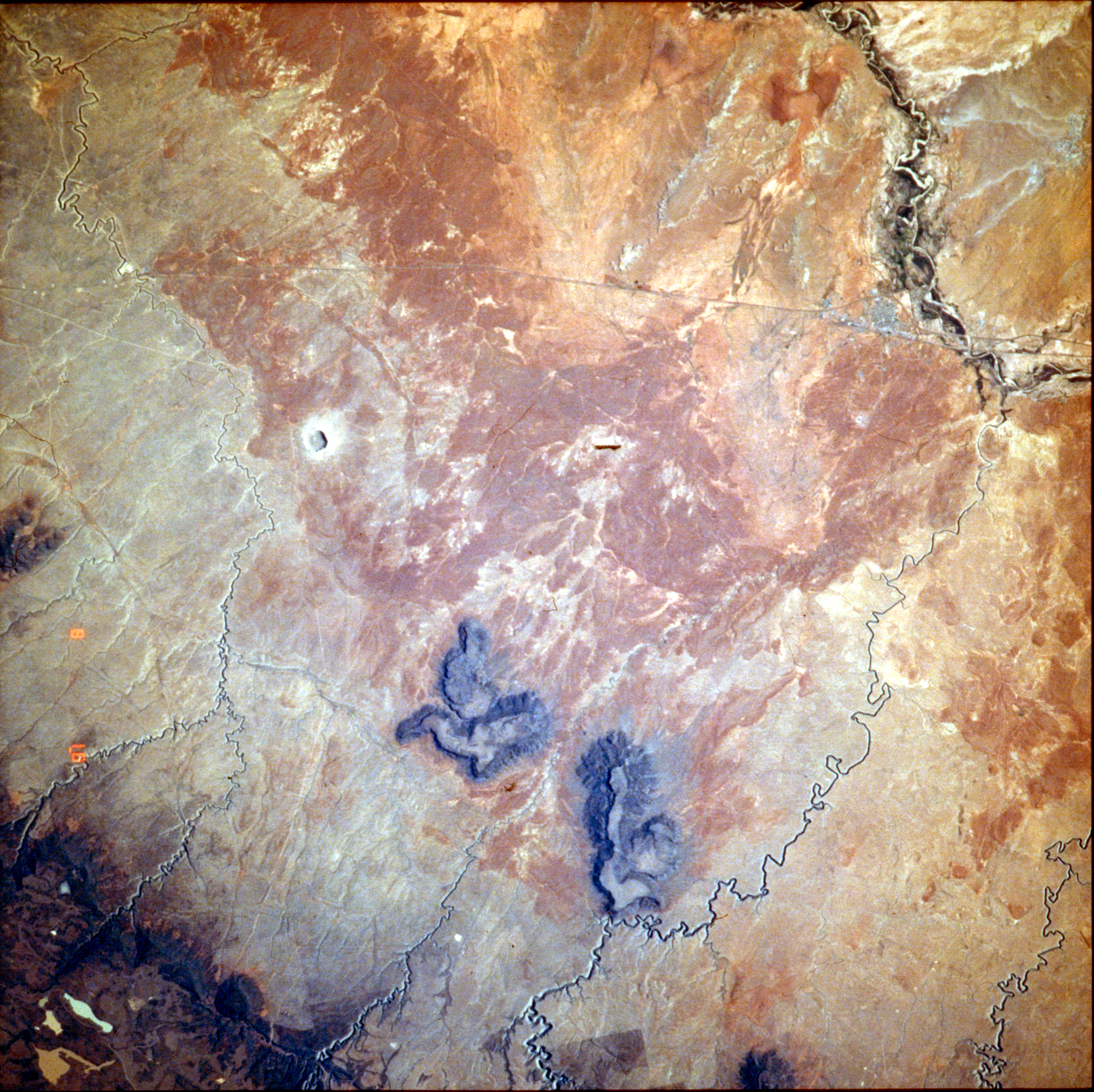
- Near Interstate 40 and Two Guns Near Meteor Crater An image showing almost the full length (center left)
- Floor elevation: Approx. 4,712 ft (1,400 m)
- Length: ≈ 81 miles (130 km)
- Width: 550 ft (170 m)

Geography
- Location: Arizona
- Coordinates: 35°17′46″N 110°59′21″W
- Interactive map of Canyon Diablo

Canyon Diablo, previously named "Cañon Diablo", is a canyon that winds through the Colorado Plateau approximately 30 miles (48 km) east of Flagstaff in northern Arizona. It is an example of an incised meander, a river bend carved into the plateau by erosion, creating a gorge. Portions of the canyon experience an ephemeral stream and act as a tributary to the Little Colorado River.

Archeologists have discovered evidence of human settlements belonging to both the older Desert Archaic peoples and the more recent Sinagua people from the 12th century. In the 19th century, several Old West ghost towns were established on the rim of the canyon, including Canyon Diablo and Two Guns. Today, the 81-mile (130 km) canyon lies within both Coconino County and the Navajo Nation.

Three bridges now span the canyon: a railroad bridge originally associated with the Atchison, Topeka and Santa Fe Railway that connected the southern route of the first transcontinental railroad through Arizona across the canyon in 1882, but was later rebuilt and modernized in 1947; a former automobile bridge that once carried Route 66 over the canyon; and the current highway bridge that hosts Interstate 40.

== Climate ==
The climate of Canyon Diablo and the immediate vicinity is generally arid to semi-arid, with microclimates created by elevation and topography. Summers are generally moderate in temperature while winters can dip to severe cold for periods of time. Microclimate conditions are formed by slope exposure to the sun and by the canyon restricting the total solar input into other areas of the canyon. Canyon Diablo is also subject to mesoscale drought cycles, on the order of hundreds of years. Changes in the precipitation volumes have been identified in the 13th and 16th century along with a cycle which started in 1998.

== Geology ==
Canyon Diablo is an 81-mile (130 km) long canyon that is located 30 miles (48 km) east of Flagstaff in northern Arizona. The canyon winds northeast to southwest through the high desert of the Colorado Plateau. The larger portion of the canyon eroded through yellow-gray limestone that formed during the Permian, the last period of the Paleozoic. The canyon is an example of an incised meander, a river bend carved into the plateau by erosion, creating a gorge.

River incision began in the late Pliocene, approximately 2-3 million years ago or earlier, and continued, along with weathering processes occurring after incision, for several hundred thousand years. An ephemeral stream intermittently flows within the canyon, often referred to as a wash or arroyo, acting as a tributary to the Little Colorado River. The Kaibab Limestone is the dominant rock formation forming the canyon walls, though some of the stretches of the canyon traverse the younger Early to Middle Triassic Moenkopi Formation. The canyon originates within the Miocene to Pliocene basalts south of Flagstaff, Arizona. The estimated drainage area for Canyon Diablo and its ephemeral watercourse Walnut Creek totals around 1,180 sq mi (3,100 km^{2}).

The walls of the canyon have an average height of 131 feet (40 m), spanning 550 feet (170 m) in width and reaching a depth of 225 feet (69 m) near the railway bridge. At an elevation of around 4,712 feet (1,436 m), its walls and channels have been compared to similar types of canyons and valleys observed on Mars.

=== Meteor Crater proximity ===
The canyon passes 2.5 miles (4.0 km) west of Meteor Crater, and lies in the westernmost portion of the meteorite strewn field resulting from the impact that created the crater 50,000 years ago. Fragments of the meteorite have been found near the canyon. In 1891, American mineralogist Albert E. Foote was one of the first to formally study a fragment, naming it the Canyon Diablo meteorite. The convention at the time was to name a meteorite after the closest post office where the fragment was found. In 1956, American geochemist Clair Patterson notably used the meteorite to help date the age of Earth.

== History ==
=== Human settlement ===
Archaeologists have found evidence of Sinagua people settling in areas around the canyon from 1120-1225 CE, around the time of the Elden Pueblo. Earlier evidence of human settlement preceding the Sinagua occupation was later discovered near the canyon in 1967. Projectile points, basalt and chert knives, cutter-scrapers, unusual perforating tools, and other objects were recovered, belonging to the Desert Archaic peoples cultural tradition. They are believed to belong to a Late Archaic Southwest hunter-gatherer culture that lived in the northern Arizona grasslands sometime between 3000–500 BCE. At least half of the site containing the older settlement was found to have been destroyed by the construction of Interstate 40. Portions of the canyon are located in Coconino County and Navajo Nation lands today, where it is referred to as Kin Łigaaí in the Navajo language.

=== Transcontinental railroad ===
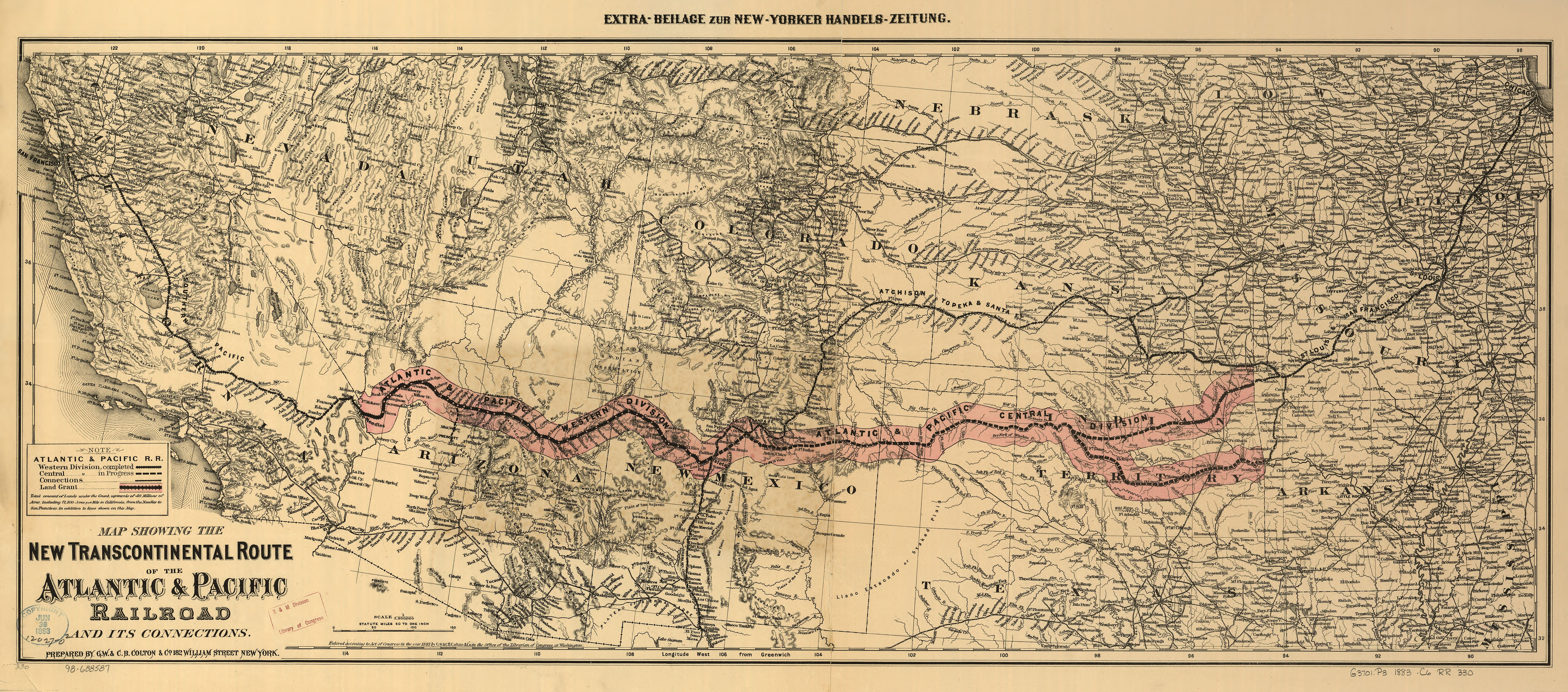
A map showing the fast growth of the A&P route by 1883, only a year after the completion of the Canyon Diablo bridge

In the 19th century, railroad development drove new human settlement in the Old West. The Pacific Railroad Surveys of the 1850s searched for a southern transcontinental route through the Arizona Territory. Expeditions along the 35th parallel by officer Amiel Weeks Whipple in 1853 identified a steep canyon blocking the route, noting its name "Cañon Diablo" in his survey. The name was not officially anglicized and changed to Canyon Diablo until the early 20th century.

The first transcontinental railroad in the United States was completed in 1869 along a central route. The Atlantic and Pacific Railroad (A&P) planned a southern transcontinental line from Missouri to the Pacific through Arizona and New Mexico, but it went bankrupt in 1876. Its western division was taken over in 1880 by the Atchison, Topeka & Santa Fe Railway (Santa Fe), which continued expanding westward through Arizona. A cartographic map showing a proposed new railway line crossing the canyon was published by A&P in 1881, with the railroad bridge across the gorge completed in 1882 by the Santa Fe. The bridge was rebuilt in 1947 and is now known as the BNSF Canyon Diablo railroad bridge, a well-known railfan site.

=== Canyon Diablo Bridge ===
A later automobile bridge, the Canyon Diablo Bridge, was constructed nearby in 1915 and once used by U.S. Route 66 to cross the canyon south of the present I-40 bridges. It is listed on the National Register of Historic Places.

Canyon Diablo features

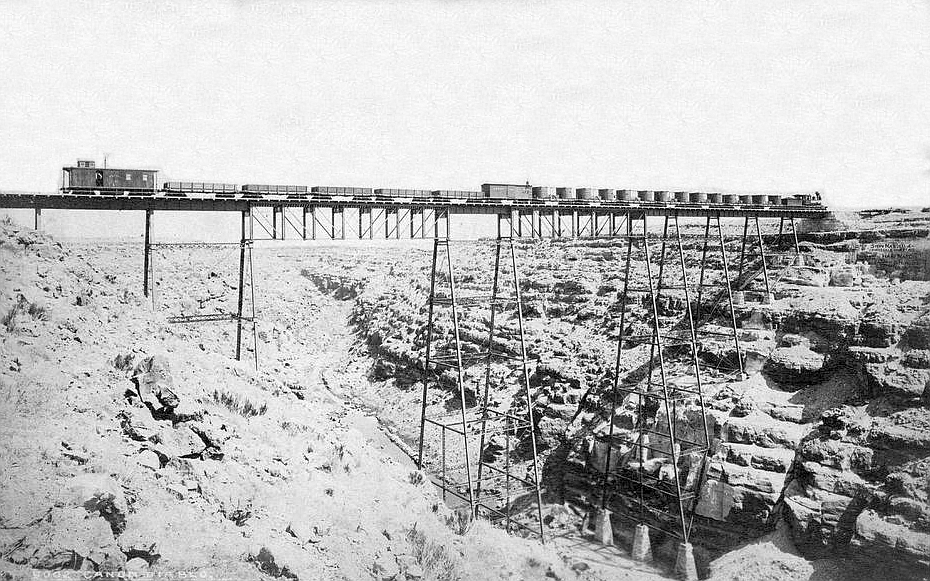
The original Atchison, Topeka and Santa Fe Railway bridge over Canyon Diablo, c. 1883–1903

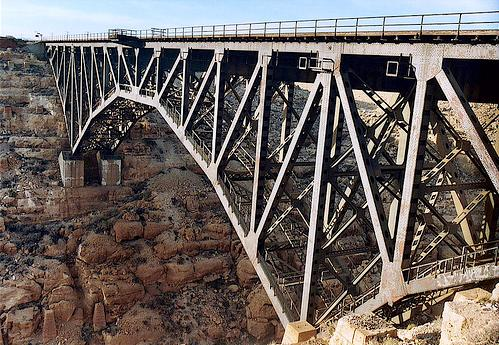
The bridge was rebuilt in 1947 and is now known as the BNSF Canyon Diablo railroad bridge.

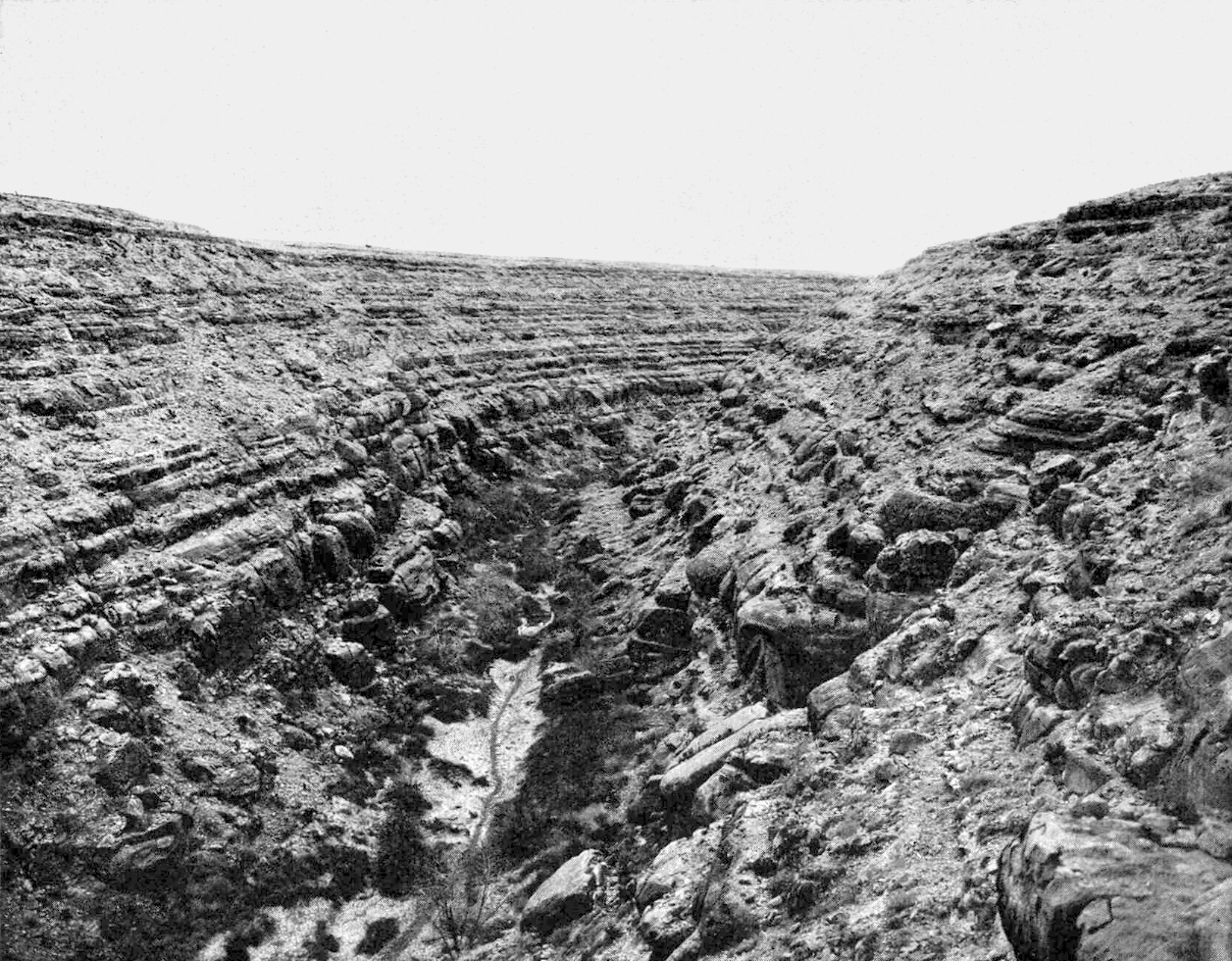
Canyon Diablo looking north from the railroad; the Kaibab Formation is evident (1910)
