= Canyon Diablo Bridge =

Bridge in Winona, Arizona, United States

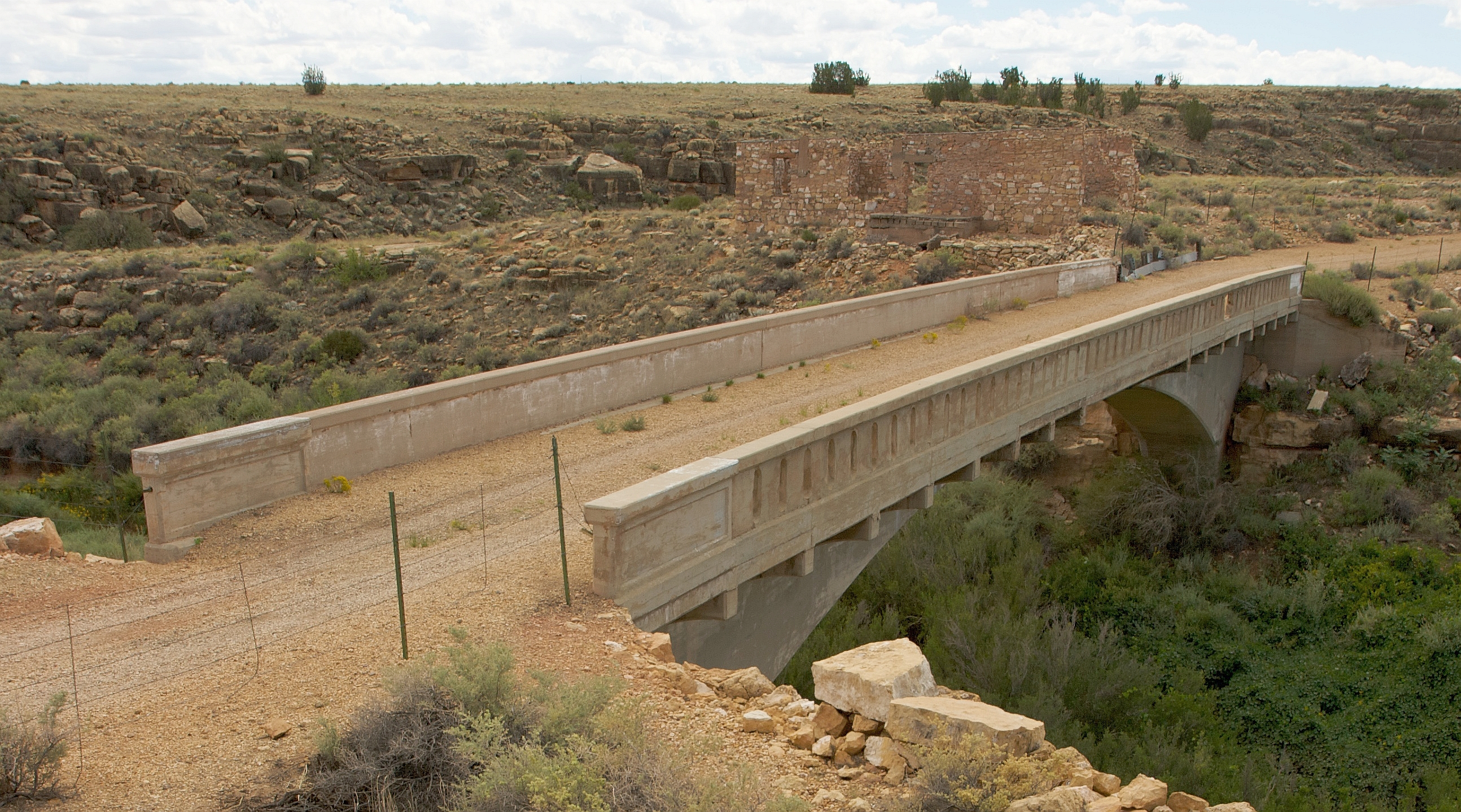
- Coordinates: 35°6′56.46″N 111°5′44.24″W
- Carries: Vehicles
- Crosses: Canyon Diablo
- Locale: Two Guns, Arizona, United States

Characteristics
- Design: Reinforced concrete Luten arch with cantilevered roadway
- Total length: 146 ft (45 m)

History
- Construction start: Winter 1914-15
- Opened: March 17, 1915
- Closed: 1938
- Replaced by: Interstate 40 bridge
- Canyon Diablo Bridge
- U.S. National Register of Historic Places
- Location within Arizona Location within the United States
- Architect: Topeka Bridge & Iron Co. Thomas Maddock
- MPS: Vehicular Bridges in Arizona
- NRHP reference No.: 88001664
- Added to NRHP: September 30, 1988

Location
- Interactive map of Canyon Diablo Bridge

Canyon Diablo Bridge is an abandoned automobile bridge in Coconino County, Arizona, United States, approximately 30 mi (48 km) east of Flagstaff, Arizona. The bridge carried Route 66 over Canyon Diablo. The ghost town of Two Guns, once a prosperous tourist stop, is near the east end of the bridge.

== History and design ==
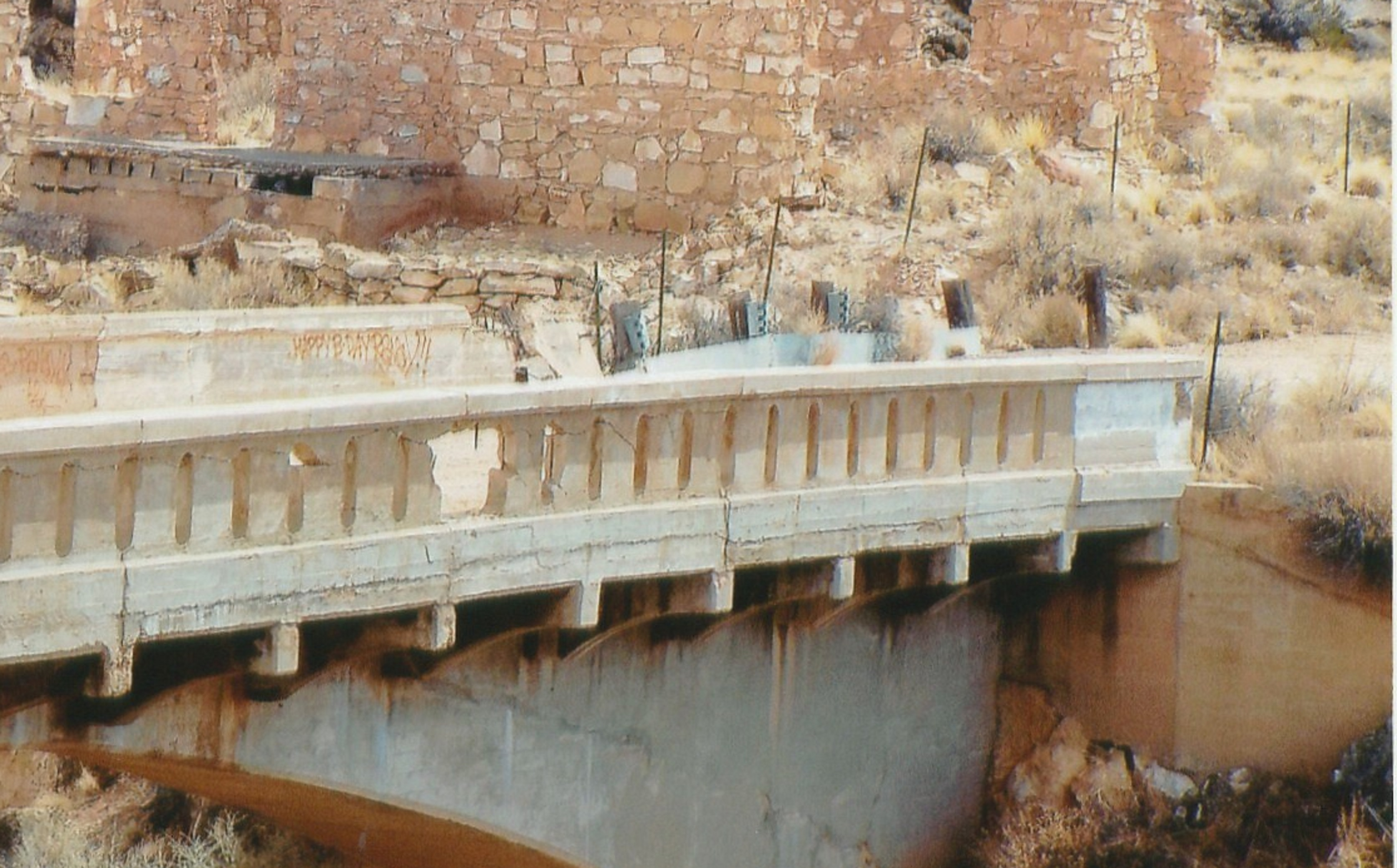
Deteriorating condition of Canyon Diablo Bridge in 2018

As settlers populated the area in the mid-1800s, the Two Guns location was recognized as a favorable place to cross the formidable Canyon Diablo; first by wagon, then later by vehicle. Travelers would follow paths which zig-zagged the canyon's embankments, and then cross the usually-dry riverbed.

In 1914, Canyon Padre Bridge was opened 19 mi (31 km) west of Two Guns. That same year, Arizona State engineer Lamar Cobb selected and surveyed the Two Guns location for the construction of a bridge across Canyon Diablo. Plans and specifications were purchased for $500 from the Topeka Bridge & Iron Co., who designed a standard 128 ft (39 m) Luten arch bridge with a cantilevered roadway, similar in design to the bridge across Canyon Padre.

Water occasionally flowed through Canyon Diablo, and the volatile nature of those flows was reflected in the design of the bridge's concrete parapet walls; the upstream wall was solid to protect the roadway from floodwaters, while the downstream wall was pierced with slots.

The construction contract was awarded late in 1914 to the lowest bidder for $9000, Thomas Haddock of Williams, Arizona, who used concrete and reinforcing steel supplied by the state to erect the bridge that winter. On March 17, 1915, Canyon Diablo Bridge opened.

The bridge was at first part of the National Old Trails Road (known as the Santa Fe Highway in Arizona), which in 1926 became part of U.S. Route 66. The bridge was used until a new bridge was erected just north of Canyon Diablo Bridge in 1938, after which Route 66 followed Interstate 40 at the Two Guns location.

The Canyon Diablo Bridge was added to the National Register of Historic Places in 1988.

== See also ==
- U.S. Route 66 in Arizona
