= Albert E. Foote =

American mineralogist and physician (1846–1895)

- Born: 4 February 1846; Hamilton, New York United States
- Died: 10 October 1895 (aged 49)
- Education: University of Michigan

Albert E. Foote (1846–1895) was an American mineralogist and physician.

== Early life ==
On February 4, 1846, Foote was born in Hamilton, New York. Foote's father was Edward Warren Foote. Foote's mother was Phoebe Steere.

== Education ==
Foote attended Academy at Cortland, New York he changed to Madison University and later to Harvard University. He was admitted to University of Michigan where he studied medicine. He received his Doctorate 25 June 1867.

== Career ==
With Foote's knowledge of chemistry, he was appointed assistant professor at the Iowa State Agricultural College at Ames in 1861. He became a full professor in 1871.

He was a collector of minerals all his life and acquired a collection which was presented on several occasions. At the Centennial Exposition in 1876 in Philadelphia he started selling part of his collected mineral starting a business as a professional mineral trader.

== Personal life ==
In December 1872, Foote's son Warren Mathews Foote was born in Ames, Iowa.

On October 10, 1895, Foote died of chronic tuberculosis.

His company was taken over by his son.

== Additional sources ==
- Kraus, Edward H. "Albert E. Foote [1846–1895], M. D., Naturalist". Earth Science. 14 (2): 65–68.
- Kraus, Edward H. (1959). "Albert E. Foote, The Naturalist – A Michigan Alumnus". Quarterly Review. 64 (21): 341–347.
- Heitner, H. "Dr. Foote and his Minerals". Matrix. 1 (5): 70–73.
- Toothaker, C. R. . (1951). "The days of A. E. Foote". Rocks & Minerals. 26 (9–10): 460–463. doi:10.1080/00357529.1951.11768231.
- Dake, Henry Carl. "The Saga of Albert E. Foote [1846–1895]". Mineralogist. 27 (10–11): 195–200.
