= Two Guns, Arizona =

Former roadside attraction in northern Arizona

Two Guns
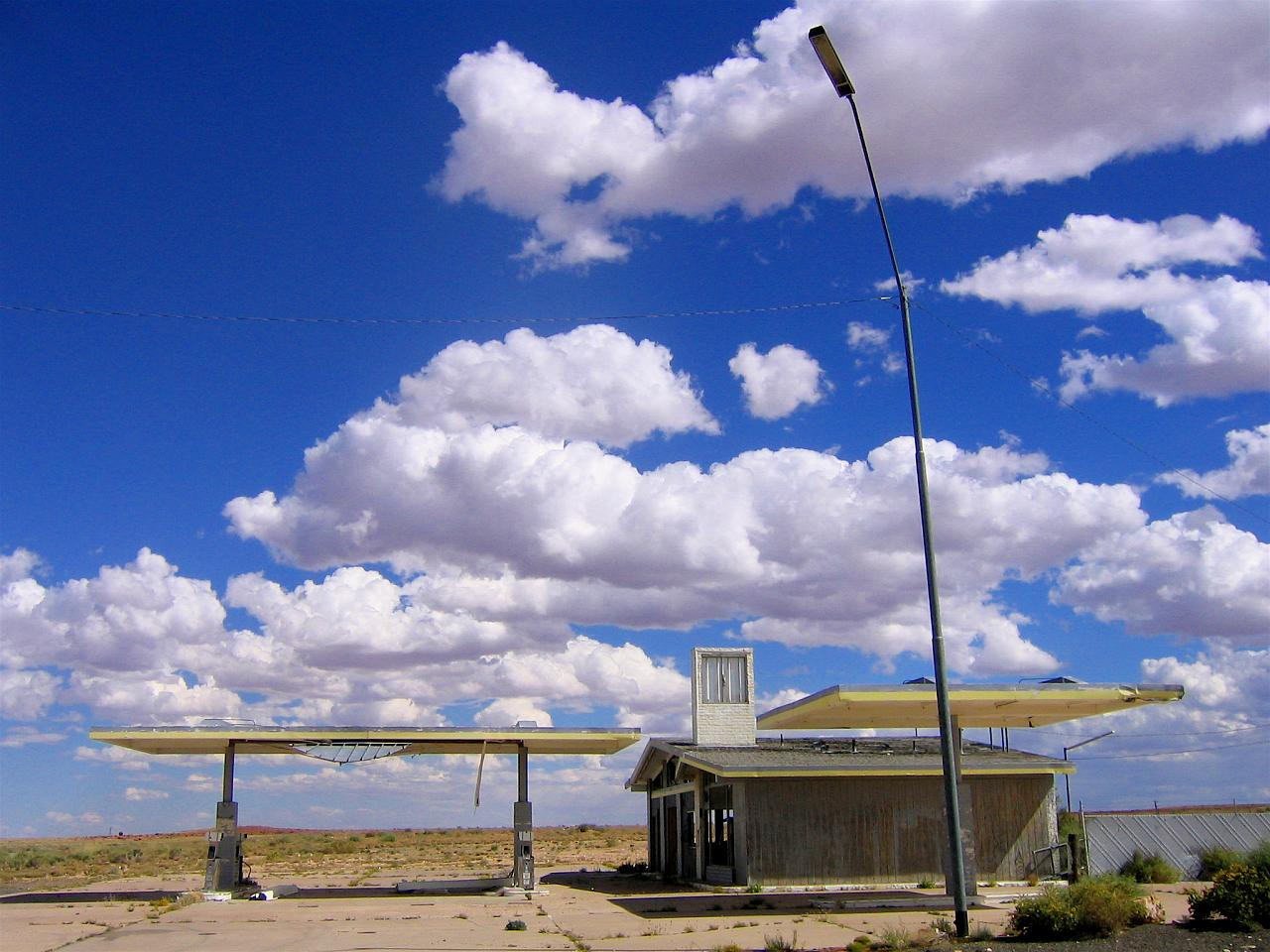
- Abandoned gas station and diner (built 1960s)
- Interactive map of Two Guns
- 35°07′04″N 111°05′37″W
- Location: Coconino County, Arizona, United States

History
- Built: Early 20th century

Two Guns is a defunct roadside attraction near Interstate 40 in northern Arizona, United States. It is located on the east rim of Canyon Diablo in Coconino County, west of Winslow and northeast of Phoenix. This area was originally known as Canyon Lodge, but became known as Fort Two Guns with the arrival of Harry E. "Indian" Miller in the 1920s. The "Fort" was dropped in the 1930s.

Although classified as a ghost town in popular literature, Two Guns was actually a tourist trap that reached its peak in the 1940s. Its appeal began to diminish after the interstate highway was built in the 1950s, as travelers sped past it on their way to their final destinations. This fate was common to most roadside attractions that were once located near U.S. Route 66.

== Geography ==
=== Canyon Diablo ===
In the late 1850s, military officer Edward F. Beale conducted a survey across northern Arizona along the 35th parallel north, seeking a wagon route from Fort Defiance, Arizona to the border of California. This route was used to establish a corridor known as Beale's Wagon Road, which became the foundation for future transportation networks in Arizona, including the Santa Fe railway, followed by the National Old Trails Road for automobiles.

Stagecoaches began following the Winslow-Flagstaff stage portion of the road across Canyon Diablo by the end of the century. The first National Old Trails Road opened in 1912, allowing automobile travel from coast to coast for the first time. This road used the northern Arizona route when the Canyon Diablo Bridge was built in 1915, making it part of the Santa Fe Highway within the National Old Trails Road network. In the 1920s, this highway was incorporated into U.S. Route 66. Business owners set up attractions near Route 66 to attract customers and sell commercial goods.

Two Guns is located in Coconino County between the city of Flagstaff and the town of Winslow. The complex lies across from the Canyon Diablo Bridge on the east rim of Canyon Diablo, about 25 mi (40 km) west of Winslow and 200 mi (320 km) northeast of Phoenix.

== History ==
=== Canyon Lodge ===
Earl Marion Cundiff and his wife, Louise, established the Canyon Lodge on the rim of Canyon Diablo around 1924. They opened a post office at the Lodge in 1925. Cundiff was both acting postmaster and store proprietor. Lloyd Parks also ran a garage and restaurant at the Lodge. Cundiff, who was originally from Arkansas, had a long history of aggression and violence. There was even evidence that he had been placed in a sanitarium in the past, supposedly after receiving a head injury. The local sheriff testified that he was one of the county's biggest problems and the subject of more complaints than just about anyone else. Cundiff had been arrested multiple times for violent acts, and even Louise had been charged with assaulting Parks's wife.

=== "Indian" Miller ===
Before he arrived at Canyon Diablo, Harry Edgar Miller, an entrepreneur whose entire family pretended to be Native American, had worked in the early 1920s at the Walnut Canyon National Monument. To generate authenticity for his business, he fabricated a backstory of being an Apache to help sell products. In reality, Miller, his wife, and his daughter were all white, non-Natives. (Note: Sensationalist newspaper articles and "true" Western pulp magazine writers like Gladwell Richardson promoted Miller's claims that he was a Native American without question. It was not until the 21st century that scholars began to debunk these ideas, with historian William F. Stoutamire at the University of Nebraska at Kearney one of many academics who were critical of the existing narrative.) Miller himself was born in 1879 in Roswell, New Mexico, to a white father from Iowa and a white mother from Missouri, while his white wife was born on the East Coast.

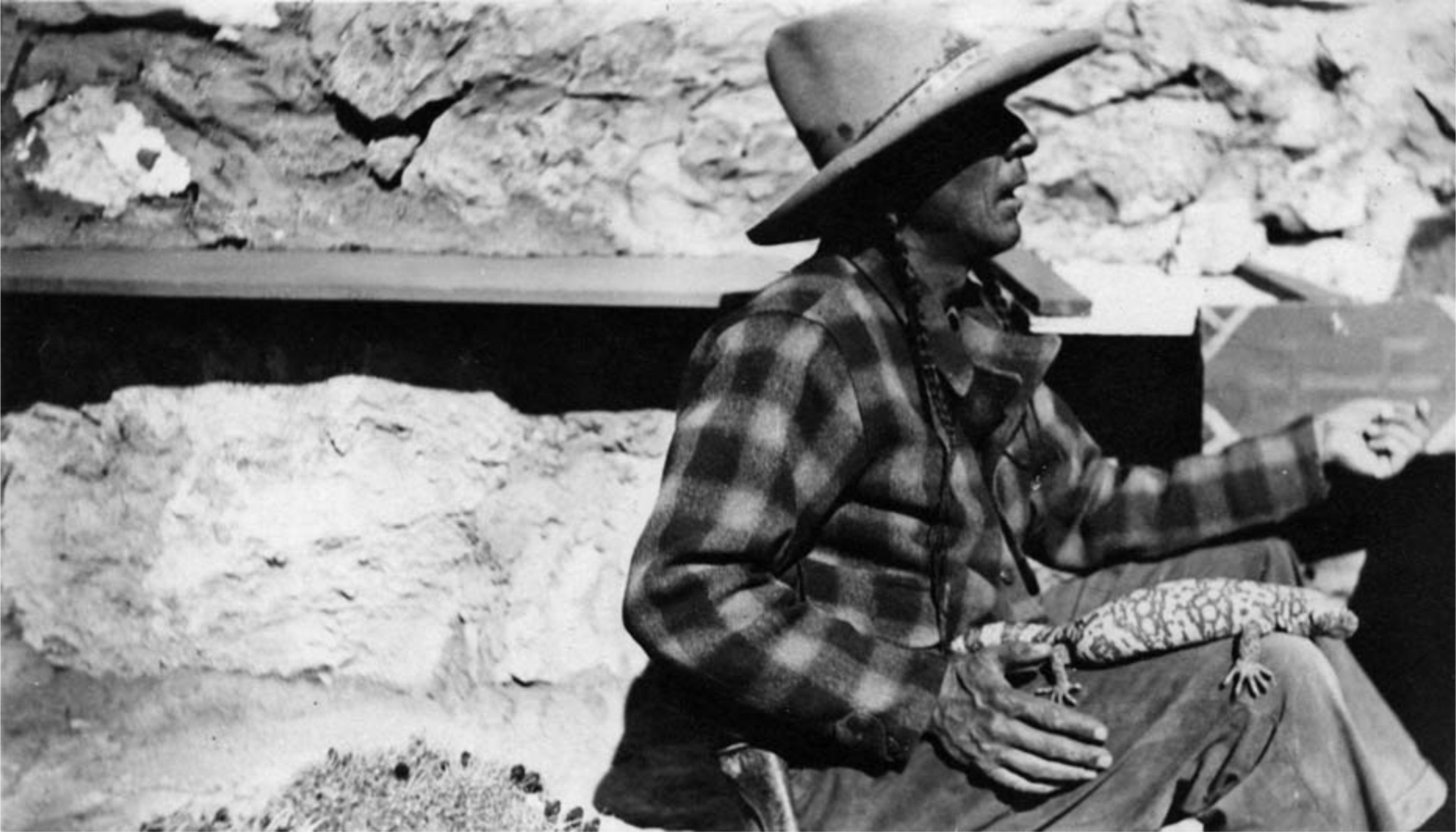
"Two Guns" Miller with a Gila monster at his zoo (1929)

At the national monument, Miller had built a wikiup which he used to operate a store where he ran a small zoo and museum and sold his own art and poetry; he also published a magazine he called the Moccasin. Miller was convincing in his own way; he gave lectures to tourists about indigenous practices, but he promoted pseudoarchaeology that deviated from mainstream academic research. Miller himself was known by at least three names: "Two Guns", "Indian Miller", and "Chief Crazy Thunder", which he used to attract attention and promote his business.

Miller moved on from Walnut Canyon and came to Canyon Diablo in early 1925. The Coconino Sun announced that Miller had arrived with his family and set up shop in Canyon Lodge. The article describes Miller's new roadside attraction for tourists traveling on the National Old Trails Road, a business featuring similar attractions to those he had run at Walnut Canyon: a new museum, a fake cliff dwelling, a souvenir store, and another zoo.

Miller was successful with his business, but was at odds with Cundiff, with the two of them often getting into fights. In 1926, there was a final confrontation, with Cundiff ending up dead from a gunshot to the neck. Miller was accused of murdering him. In court, Miller's attorney successfully argued self-defense, presenting evidence that Cundiff had entered Miller's house, grabbed Miller's gun, and fired at him first. The unusual circumstances surrounding Cundiff's death, combined with evidence that Cundiff was widely known to law enforcement for his pattern of violent behavior, while Miller had a reputation as a peaceful person, led to Miller's acquittal. He left the area for New Mexico in 1930.

=== Two Guns ===
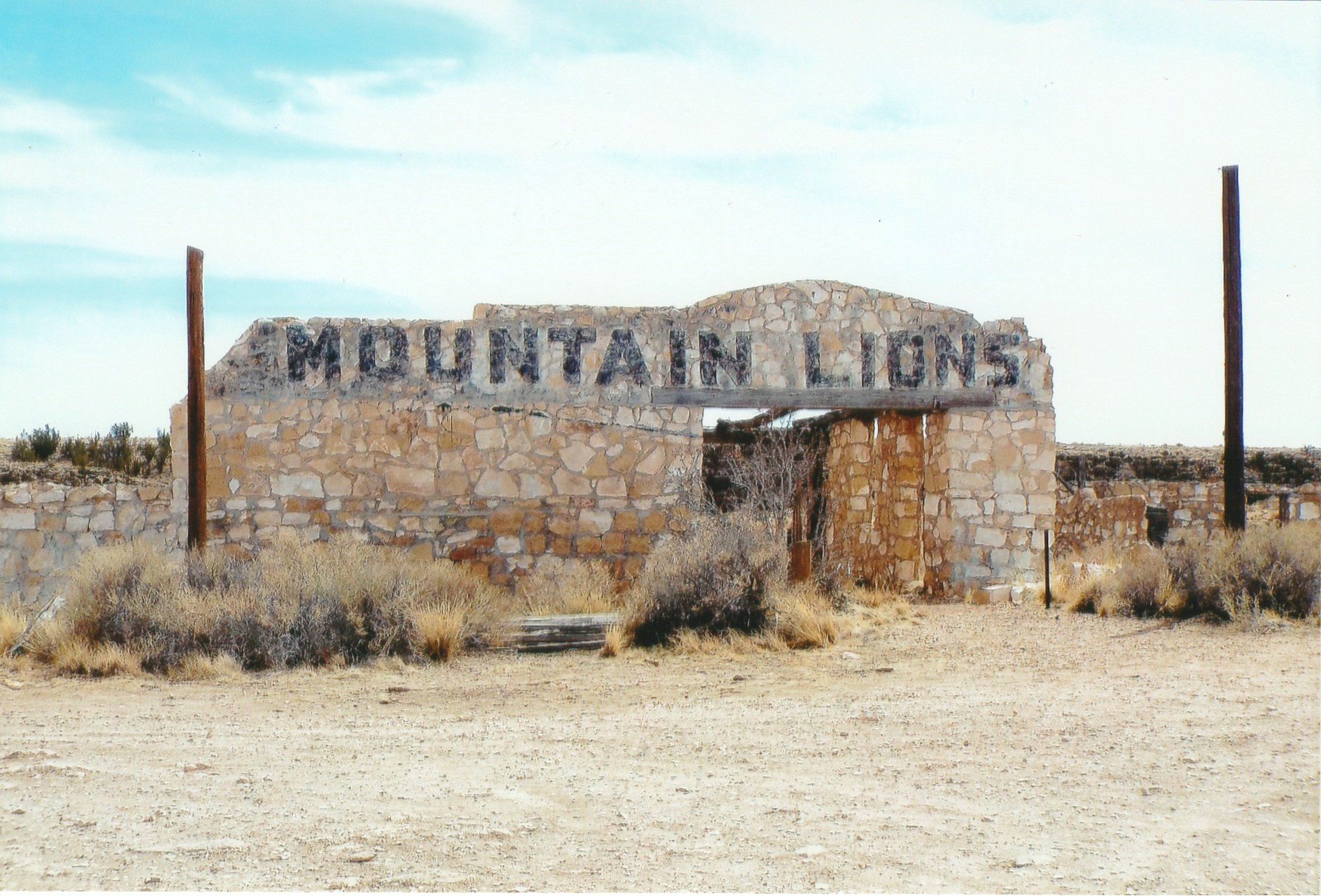
The remains of Miller's zoo, surrounded by abandoned animal cages (2018)

The name "Two Guns" was first used as a moniker by Miller, with newspapers often referring to him with the nickname. In the late 1920s, the media began using the name to refer to the general geographic area where Miller operated his business. Two early examples include "Fort Two Guns" and "Two Guns", which appear to have replaced the use of Canyon Lodge in or around 1927. Both names appear on April 22 of that year. In those two examples, "Fort Two Guns" was used humorously by a writer to refer to Miller's location, while "Two Guns" was used separately in a legal context to refer to Miller's location within Canyon Diablo itself.

In terms of name recognition, Two Guns came into its own when it received national currency in 1928. In that year, the area was used as a "desert outpost" for the Trans-American Footrace, with that leg of the race beginning in Flagstaff. News stories about the race were carried by United Press International and distributed across the country by wire service, with most stories referring to the Canyon Lodge area as "Two Guns Camp". By 1929, newspapers were calling the area "Two Guns, Arizona".

=== Decline ===
The area fell into ruin in the late 20th century after the interstate was built. Many roadside attractions went out of business on Route 66 as the interstate made non-stop travel possible. Different business owners added newer attractions over the years, including a new gas station and store in the 1960s, but there was not enough business to sustain it. A fire destroyed the structures in 1971.

Bob Thomas, a correspondent for The Arizona Republic, noted the bizarre and troubled history of Two Guns, describing it as an "early tourist town" filled with fake Native American ruins, counterfeit artifacts, and captive animals, and beset by murder, arson, and failed businesses. Two Guns is often classified as a ghost town, although Nick Gerlich, a marketing professor at West Texas A&M University who specializes in the history of roadside attractions, notes that "Two Guns is a 'town' that never was one".

=== Features ===
I40 exit

Gas station

Abandoned gas pumps

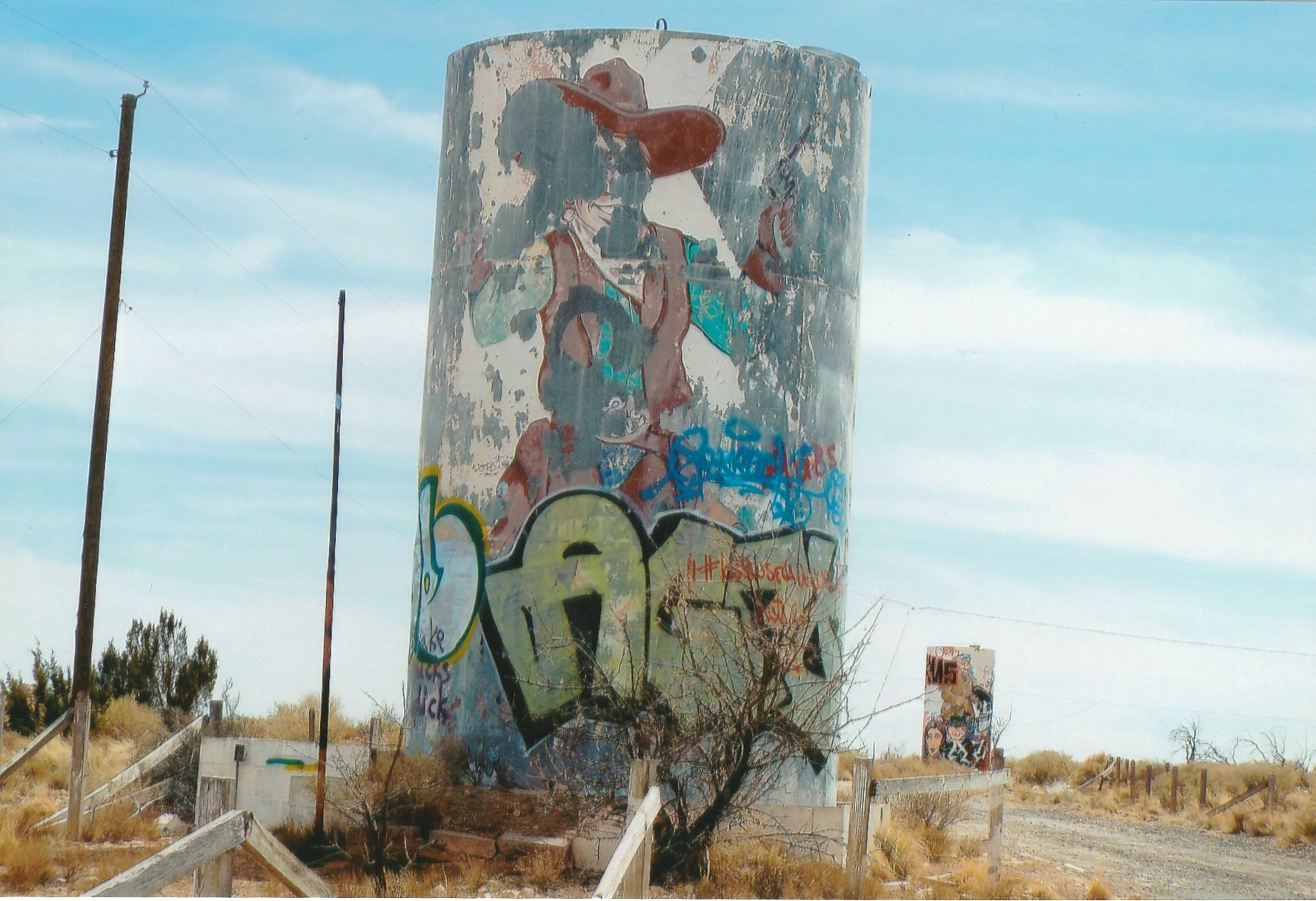
Old water tank

KOA Office/Store

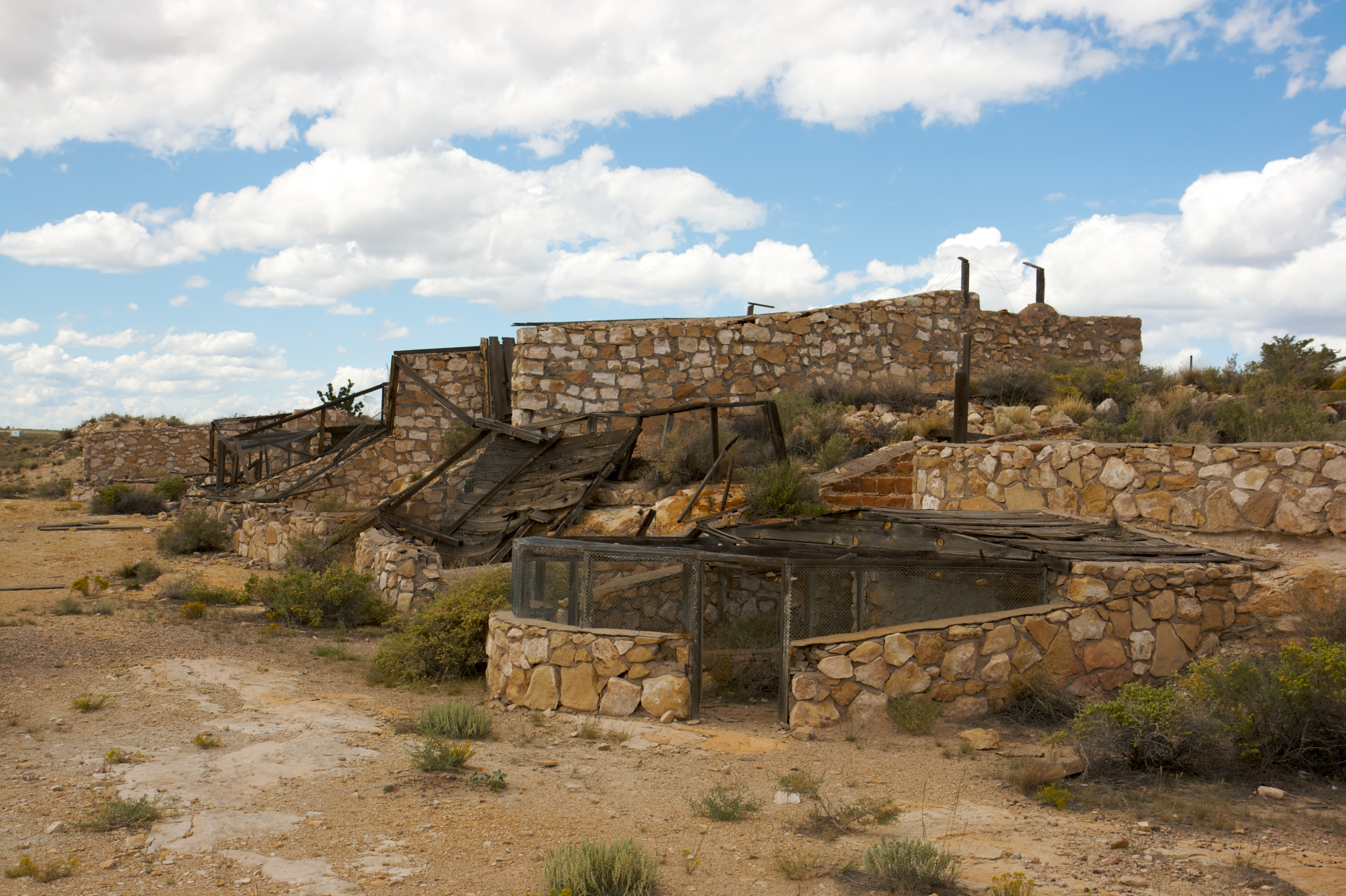
Old zoo cages

Canyon Diablo Bridge

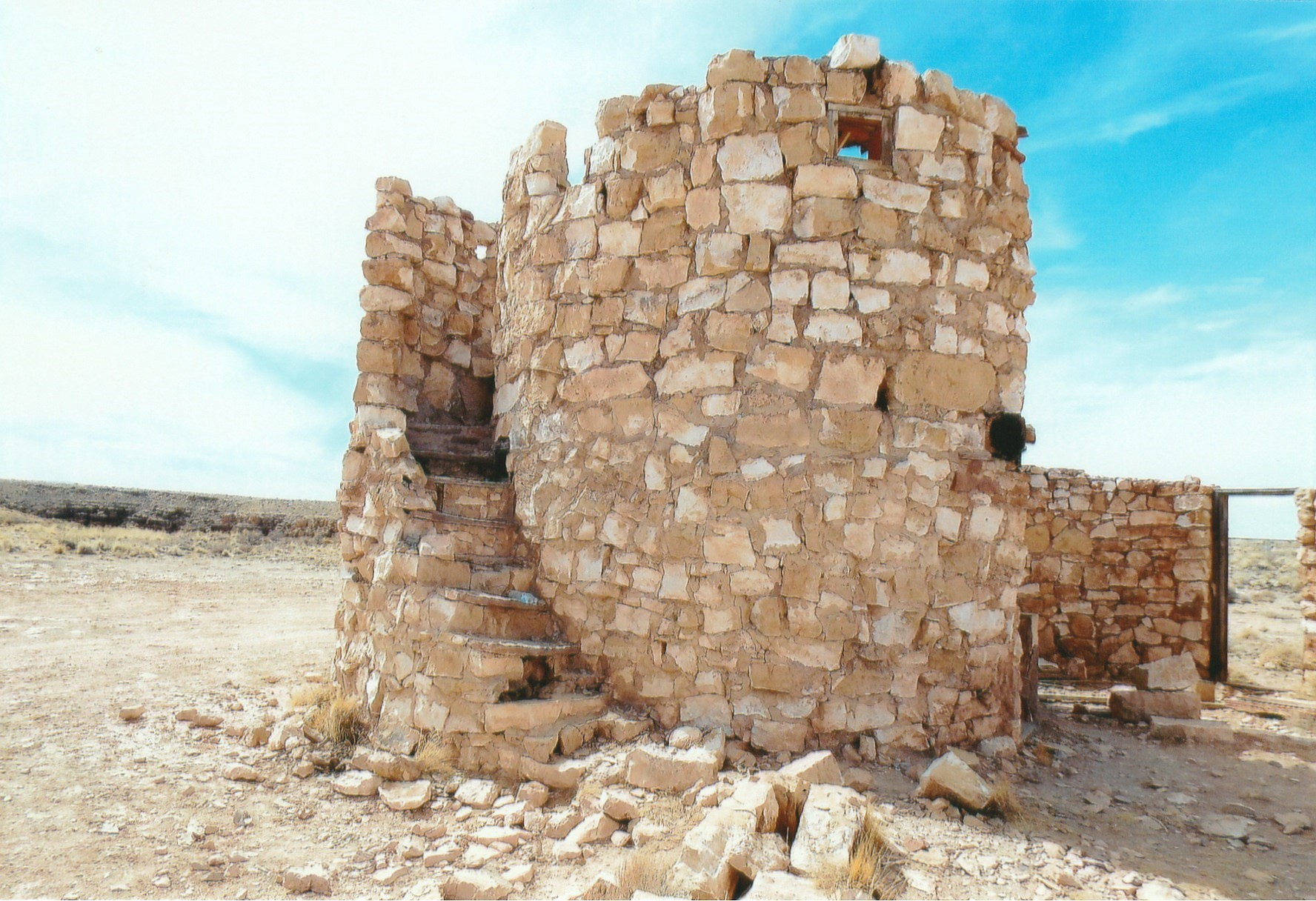
"Hopi" roundhouse
