= List of steamboats on the Colorado River =

This list summarizes basic characteristics of steamboats and towed barges placed in service on the Colorado River and its tributaries. The article Steamboats of the Colorado River expands on the topic.

== Steamboats on the Lower Colorado River ==
Table 1: Steamboats on the Lower Colorado River
Name	Type	Year built	Where built	Builders	Launched	Owners	Tons	Length	Beam	Draft	Engines - cargo tonnage	Disposition
Cochan	stern	1899	Yuma	unknown	Yuma, 1899	Colorado Steam Navigation Company	234	135'	31'	22" loaded, 11" light	Taken from the Gila - 125 tons.	Dismantled Spring, 1910
Cocopah I	stern	1859	San Francisco	unknown	Gridiron, Sonora, Aug. 1859	George A. Johnson & Company	unknown	140'	29'	14.5"	unknown - 60 tons, tow 100 ton barge	Dismantled 1867, housing in Port Isabel
Cocopah II	stern	1867	Arizona City	unknown	Arizona City, May 1867	George A. Johnson & Company, Colorado Steam Navigation Company	231	147.5'	28'	unknown	unknown - unknown	Dismantled 1881
Colorado I	stern	1855	San Francisco	John G. North	Estuary, Dec. 1855	George A. Johnson & Company	unknown	120'	unknown	unknown	80 hp - 70 tons	Dismantled April, 1862
Colorado II	stern	1862	Arizona City	John G. North	Arizona City, 1862	George A. Johnson & Company, Colorado Steam Navigation Company	179	145'	29'	16"	80 hp from Colorado I - 70 tons	Dismantled 1882
Esmerelda	stern	1862	San Francisco	Patrick Henry Tiernan	San Francisco, engaged in the upper San Joaquin River trade, sent to Colorado River arriving March, 1864	Union Line, Pacific & Colorado Steam Navigation Co., Arizona Navigation Co., George A. Johnson & Company	unknown	93'	20'	33"	unknown - 50 tons, tow 100 ton barge	Dismantled 1868
Explorer	stern (iron hull)	1857	Philadelphia	Reaney, Neafie & Company	Robinson's Landing, Baja California, 1857	U. S. ArmyCorps of Topographical Engineers, George A. Johnson & Company	unknown	54'	13'	3'	unknown - unknown	Engine removed 1858, used as a barge until lost 1864.
General Jesup	side	1853	unknown	unknown	Estuary, 1854	George A. Johnson & Company	unknown	104'	17'	30"	50 hp - 50 tons	Dismantled, 1859.
General Rosales	propeller-driven	1878	unknown	unknown	Yuma, Arizona July 1878	Gulf of California Steamship Company	54	96'	16'	4'	unknown - unknown	Sent to Guaymas, Sonora, Sept. 1878
Gila	stern	1873	San Francisco	Patrick Henry Tiernan	Port Isabel, Sonora, 1873	Colorado Steam Navigation Company	236	149'	31'	16.5" (3.8' deep hull)	unknown - 125 tons	Rebuilt as Cochan, 1899
Mohave I	stern	1864	San Francisco	John G. North	Estuary, May 1864	George A. Johnson & Company, Colorado Steam Navigation Company	193	135'	28'	4'	unknown - up to 225 tons, or tow 2 barges, with 100 tons of cargo	Dismantled 1875, machinery used to equip Onward in 1877
Mohave II	stern	1876	San Francisco	Patrick Henry Tiernan	Port Isabel, Sonora, May 1876	Colorado Steam Navigation Company	188	149.5'	31.5'	12"	unknown - unknown	Dismantled Jan. 1900
Nina Tilden	stern	1864	San Francisco	Martin Vice	San Francisco, July 1864, arrived at Colorado River Aug. 1864	Philadelphia Silver & Copper Mining Co., Pacific & Colorado Steam Navigation Co., Arizona Navigation Co., George A. Johnson & Company, Colorado Steam Navigation Company	unknown	97'	22'	12"	unknown - 120 tons	Wrecked Sept. 1874, at Port Isabel
Retta	stern	1900	Yuma	unknown	Yuma, 1900	Mexican-Colorado Navigation Company	unknown	36'	6'	unknown	unknown - unknown	Sunk, February, 1905
St. Vallier	stern	1899	unknown	unknown	Needles, California, Early 1899	Santa Ana Mining Company, Mexican-Colorado Navigation Company	94	74'	17'	unknown	unknown - unknown	Sunk, March, 1909
San Jorge	screw	1901	Chicago	unknown	Yuma, June 1901	Mexican-Colorado Navigation Company	unknown	38'	9'	18"	unknown - unknown	To the Gulf, July 1901
Searchlight	stern	1902	Needles	F. L. Hawley	Needles, Dec. 1902	Colorado River Transportation Company, Colorado Steam Navigation Company, U. S. Reclamation Service	98	91'	18'	unknown	unknown - unknown	"Lost", 1916
Uncle Sam	side	June 1852	San Francisco	Domingo Marcucci	Estuary, Nov. 1852	James Turnbull	40	65'	16'	unknown	20 hp - 35 tons	Foundered 1853, 6 miles below Fort Yuma
Unnamed steamer	stern	February 1859	San Francisco	Henry Owens	Knocked down and sent to the Colorado River Estuary in the schooner Arno.	Gila Mining & Transportation Company	unknown	125'	25'	3.5'	unknown - unknown	Sank with the schooner Arno near Robinson's Landing before it could be unloaded and assembled. April 1859.

== Towed barges of the Lower Colorado River ==
- Black Crook 1864-1880s, White Fawn 1864-1880s, Barge #1 1864-1900, Barge #2 1865-1900, Barge #3 1865-1900, Barge #4 1872-1900, Pumpkin Seed 1865-1867, Silas J. Lewis 1900-1909, Enterprise 1901-1909

== Steamboats on the Green and Upper Colorado Rivers ==
Table 2: Steamboats on the Green and Upper Colorado Rivers
Name	Type	Year built	Where built	Builders	Launched	Owners	Tons	Length	Beam	Draft	Engines - cargo tonnage	Disposition
Black Eagle	screw	1907	Green River, Utah	Harry T. Yokey	Green River, Utah Jun. 1907	Harry T. Yokey		40'	6'	7-8"		Exploded, 1907
Charles H. Spencer	stern	1912	San Francisco	Schultz, Robertson and Schultz	Warm Creek, Arizona Feb. 1912	Charles H. Spencer		92.5'	25'	18-20"	100 hp - unknown	Abandoned, Spring 1912
Cliff Dweller	stern	1905	Halverson's, Utah	John J. Lumsden, Charles Anderson	Halverson's, Utah, Nov. 1905	John J. Lumsden		70'	20'	14"	coal-fired - unknown	To Salt Lake, renamed Vista, Apr. 1907
Comet	stern	1908	Green River, Wyoming	Holger Larsen	Green River, Wyoming, July 1908	Green River Navigation Company		60'	12'		coal-fired, 2 x 2O hp engines - unknown	Abandoned 1908
Major Powell	screw	1891	unknown	unknown	Green River, Utah, Aug. 1891	Green Grand & Colorado River Navigation Company		35'	8'	26"	coal-fired (wood on 2nd voyage), 2 x 6 hp - 3 tons	Dismantled, 1894
Undine	stern	1902	Rock Island, Illinois	unknown	Green River, Utah, Nov. 1901	Frank H. Summerhill		60'	10'	12" - 20"	coal-fired, 20 hp - 15 tons	Wrecked May 1902
