= Stone's Ferry, Nevada =

Extinct community in Nevada, U.S.

Coordinates: 36°7′42″N 114°26′51″W

Stone's Ferry is a former settlement founded by members of the Church of Jesus Christ of Latter-day Saints and ferry crossing of the Colorado River between Nevada and Arizona, in Clark County, Nevada, United States.

It was variously located during its history from the mouth of the Virgin River to 6 miles below the mouth of the Virgin River, opposite the Detrital Valley which provided an easy path into and out of the canyon of the Colorado River from the south and to and from the north through the Virgin and Muddy Valleys to Nevada and Utah. Subsequently, it was moved up river to a location, opposite Detrital Wash, which is its current GNIS location determined in an 1875 survey.

== History ==
Originally Stone's Ferry was a Colorado River crossing at the mouth of the Virgin River between the Virgin River and Muddy River settlements of the Mormons in Pah-Ute County, Arizona and the rest of Arizona Territory by a road southward to the mines at Chloride, Mineral Park and Cerbat and to the Hardyville - Prescott Road. It was informal, using boats that were left there for that necessity up until after the time Brigham Young visited the Muddy and Virgin River settlements in 1870. Stone's Ferry was also a landing for the barges of Captain L. C. Wilburn who poled and sailed his barges up river to bring down salt from the Mormon's Virgin River valley salt mines for the mills of El Dorado Canyon. The salt was used to process their silver ore.

When the Mormon colonists voted to abandon their settlements in the Muddy and Virgin valleys in 1870, Daniel Bonelli of St. Thomas, was the only one who voted no, and remained. He moved his family, acquired the ferry boat and established a commercial ferry boat service at Stone's Ferry, at first located 6 miles down river from the mouth of the Virgin. The ferry was subsequently moved up river to a point 2 miles below the Virgin River mouth, opposite the mouth of Detrital Wash. In 1876 Bonelli moved the ferry and his family up river to the near the old settlement of Junction City, just east of the mouth of the Virgin River and renamed the ferry Bonelli's Ferry.

== Site today ==
The site of Stone's Ferry is now under the Virgin Basin of Lake Mead.
