= Nina Tilden =

Colorado River stern-wheel steamboat

Nina Tilden, one of the two opposition stern-wheel steamboats that ran on the Colorado River from 1864 to 1868. Purchased by George A. Johnson Company it ran on the Colorado River from 1868 until 1874.

== History ==
The Nina Tilden came to be built by Alphonso F. Tilden, of the Philadelphia Silver and Copper Mining Company to secure direct shipments of goods to his mines and to challenge the monopoly of the Colorado River trade by the George A. Johnson Company. The Johnson Company had raised its freight rates to and from Tilden's mines in Eldorado Canyon in late 1863 after the mines there began processing their ore in their own quartz mill. Moreover, Johnson's steamboats would not go above Hardyville except from June to October the time of high water, and shipments above Hardyville in low water had to polled up river by barge at $40 a ton from there. More importantly there was a general discontent by miners and merchants in the up river mines and settlements over high prices and shortages that arose in late 1863. A lack of adequate shipping on the part of the company to carry the volume of cargo caused by the Colorado River mining boom had slowed delivery of goods up river from the ships in the estuary of the Colorado. Additionally steamboat captains were profiteering on the resulting shortages brought on by this bottleneck in the supply chain.

With the potential freighting profits to be made competing with the Johnson Company along the river, Tilden, decided to put a second opposition steamboat on the river, the Nina Tilden, named for Tilden's wife. She was built in San Francisco by Martin Vice and was launched in July 1864. She was 97 feet long, with a 22-foot beam, and drew 12 inches of water when light. During its test run in the bay, it was able to do 16 knots. It was capable of carrying up to 120 tons and would tow a 100-ton barge.

Tilden hired a veteran captain of the Sacramento and Fraser Rivers, George B. Gorman, steamed the Nina Tilden down the coast to the Colorado River. In September, Gorman also began to compete with the Johnson Company and with the rival opposition steamboat Esmerelda of the Union Line, towing the barge White Fawn, knocked down and shipped in a schooner to the estuary where it was reassembled.

With the addition of the two opposition steamers using barges and a third Johnson steamer the "Mohave" in furious competition, the backlog of freight that had stimulated the creation of the rival steamboat companies went away by the fall of 1864. In the summer of 1865, Tilden sold the Nina Tilden which was consolidated with the Esmerelda, into a unified opposition line the Pacific and Colorado Steam Navigation Company, headed by Thomas E. Trueworthy, with backing from San Francisco financiers. However, in 1866, the Esmerelda and Nina Tilden were seized by the Sheriff of Yuma County, for debts owned by Thomas E. Trueworthy's company. The boats passed through the hands of Arizona Navigation Company, another company the creditors tried to form hoping to salvage the opposition steamboat business. This failed and Johnson bought both boats and their barges in 1868.

The Nina Tilden continued in use on the river by Johnson's company and his new Colorado Steam Navigation Company that succeeded it. Nina Tilden carried the archives of the county seat of Yuma County from La Paz to Arizona City when its location was changed in 1870.

== Fate of the Nina Tilden ==
In 1874, the Nina Tilden was retired, and tied up at Port Isabel, Sonora following the construction there of the Gila, its replacement in 1873. Soon after she broke her lines during a high tide, was caught broadside to the tidal bore and was capsized, destroying her upper works and blocking the channel of the port. She was chopped up to remove it from the channel.
