= Peacock Mountains =

Mountain range in Mohave County, Arizona

- Location within Arizona

Highest point
- Peak: Peacock Peak (Arizona), center of range, ridgeline to north
- Elevation: 6,293 ft (1,918 m)
- Coordinates: 35°18′16″N 113°46′22″W

Dimensions
- Length: 26 mi (42 km) N-S
- Width: 10 mi (16 km) (about 14-mi at south)

Geography
- Country: United States
- State: Arizona
- Regions: Arizona transition zone, Mojave Desert, Sonoran Desert, Colorado Plateau and Basin and Range
- County: Mohave
- Communities: Valle Vista, (Hackberry) and (Kingman)
- Range coordinates: 35°18′59″N 113°46′33″W
- Borders on: Cerbat Mountains, Music Mountains-Grand Wash Cliffs, Cottonwood Mountains-Cottonwood Cliffs, Aquarius Mountains-Knight Creek, Hualapai Mountains and Hualapai Valley

The Peacock Mountains are a small, 26 mi (42 km) long mountain range in northwest Arizona, US. The range is a narrow sub-range, and an extension north, at the northeast of the Hualapai Mountains massif, which lies to the southwest. The range is defined by the Hualapai Valley to the northwest, and north and south-flowing washes on its east border, associated with faults and cliffs; the Cottonwood Cliffs (Cottonwood Mountains) are due east, and are connected to the Aquarius Cliffs southward at the west perimeter of the Aquarius Mountains; the cliffs are a result of the Aquarius Fault, which is an extension southward from the Grand Wash Cliffs and Grand Wash Fault which crosses the Colorado River at Lake Mead, and the west perimeter of the Grand Canyon/Colorado Plateau.

== Description ==
The Peacock Mountains, are a smaller, lower elevation range, only about 10 mi (16 km) wide. Peacock Peak (Arizona), 6,293 feet (1,918 m) is the range highpoint, in the approximate center of the range, with a ridgeline north to the range terminus (13 mi). At the north terminus, Arizona State Route 66 transits northeast to southeast around the range; the Grand Wash Cliffs lie due north; the northwest-trending Hualapai Valley extends from the terminus, and the Grand Wash Cliffs form its east border, also forming the southwest border of the Music Mountains; the cliffs extend approximately 100 mi northwards approaching southwest Utah.

The east side of the Peacock Mountains are defined by due-north and due-south flowing drainages on the west of the Cottonwood Cliffs. At the approximate mountain range center, a water divide finds Hackberry Wash flowing due-north to Truxton Wash, which descends from the northeast, (off east Music Mountains, and west region Aubrey Valley). Truxton Wash meets the northeast of the Peacock Mountains, then turns due northwest at the Peacock Mountains foothills, to enter the southeast of Hualapai Valley.

At the southeast of the Peacock Mountains, the headwaters of the south-flowing Knight Creek begins. Within 25 mi from the water divide the creek becomes the Big Sandy River. The southern section of the Peacock Mountains also widens to about 14 mi, with McCarrys Wash feeding east off the northeast of the Hualapai Mountains, and numerous other washes feeding from the south and southeast off the Peacock Mountains into Knight Creek.

== Vegetation communities ==
The Peacock Mountains lie at a regional confluence of five vegetation biotic communities. Mohave Desertscrub has a limit to the north (in the Grand Canyon, along the Colorado River), and is located northwest, west, and southwest of the Peacock Mountains/Kingman, Arizona region; also northwest, at the north of Hualapai Valley. To the south, the north limits of the 'Arizona Upland Sonoran Desert-scrub' is found up the Big Sandy River and its tributaries, which is north-south along the Aquarius Fault, the fault being the Grand Wash Cliffs southern extension. Another lower elevation community is the Semidesert Grassland, found especially in southeast Arizona, (middle elevation locales, Madrean Sky Islands region, Cochise County), but the zone extends northwestwards along the Arizona transition zone mountains and valleys, higher elevation grassland at the base of the northwest–by–southeast lineage of the Mogollon Rim, and associated ridges or plateaus (Mogollon Plateau); the Semidesert Grassland reaches its terminus northwest up the Big Sandy River and west to the Sacramento Valley at the west of Kingman, and northwards up into Detrital Valley.

=== Great Basin Grassland, Great Basin Conifer Woodland ===
Two higher elevation biotic communities find their west limits at the Peacock Mountains region. Upstream up Truxton Wash to the northeast, is a region of Plains and Great Basin Grassland along the Truxton Wash and mountain foothills; further east and northeast, on the west of the Coconino Plateau, (Hualapai Indian Reservation, and Aubrey Valley region), a large mostly continuous expanse of the grassland exists. The grassland is surrounded and intermixed with the 2nd higher elevation biotic community, Great Basin Conifer Woodland. Together, the woodland and the grassland encompass almost the entire north half of Arizona except for specific regions of desert (Painted Desert, the Great Basin Desertscrub, on the Colorado Plateau, or associated perimeter regions). Other exceptions are the highpoint communities of trees or alpine grasslands at the San Francisco Peaks region, or the Kaibab Plateau on the Grand Canyon North Rim, or a few other higher altitude locales. (The exceptions are the Subalpine Grassland, found especially in the White Mountains, or small areas at the San Francisco Peaks, and the Rocky Mountain Subalpine Conifer Forest found at both the White Mountains and San Francisco Peaks.)

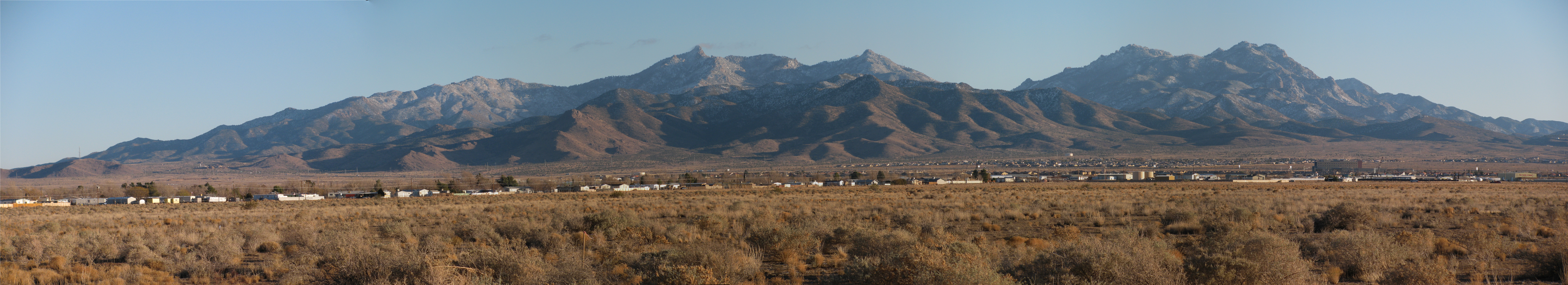
Panorama of the Hualapai Mountains massif taken from Kingman (Sacramento Valley) in December 2009.
View northeast (location of west region of Peacock Mountains), east, and southeast.
A panorama of the Hualapai Mountain range seen from Kingman, Arizona. The photographs were taken in late December and the mountains have a light dusting of snow. The camera location was south of Northern Avenue, east of Bank Street.
