= Penstemon distans =

Conservation status
- Imperiled (NatureServe)

Scientific classification
- Kingdom: Plantae
- Clade: Tracheophytes
- Clade: Angiosperms
- Clade: Eudicots
- Clade: Asterids
- Order: Lamiales
- Family: Plantaginaceae
- Genus: Penstemon
- Species: P. distans

Binomial name
- Penstemon distans N.H.Holmgren

Plant species in the veronica family

Penstemon distans, the Mount Trumbull penstemon or Mount Trumbull beardtongue, is a rare species in veronica family from Arizona.

== Description ==
Penstemon distans is a perennial herbaceous plant that typically has flowering stems that are 30 to 60 centimeters (12–24 in) tall, but can occasionally be as short as 25 cm (10 in). It has a taproot that is long and narrow topped by a branching, woody caudex. In addition to flowering stems is often has short stems without flowers that are thickly covered in leaves.

Plants of this species have both leaves on the stems and basal leaves that are not leathery. Towards their bases they are puberulent, covered in very short and thin hairs that are usually erect, while toward the ends they are puberulent and glandular. The basal leaves and the ones lower on the stems are 5.5 to 14 centimeters (2–5.5 in) long and just 0.2 to 1.4 cm wide. They are narrowly oblanceolate shaped with smooth edges to faintly toothed edges and a tapering base, sometimes stretched into an especially long petiole. The middle to upper stem leaves are 2.5 to 6 centimeters (1–2.5 in) long and just 1-7 millimeters wide, usually 3 mm or less.

The flowers are small, blue, and not particularly showy for a penstemon species.

== Taxonomy ==
Penstemon distans was scientifically described and named in 1980 by the botanist Noel Herman Holmgren. It is part of the genus Penstemon which is classified in the Plantaginaceae family and has no subspecies or botanical synonyms. Holmgren collected the type specimen together with fellow botanists Patricia Kern Holmgren and Rupert Charles Barneby in Whitmore Canyon at a site 12.5 kilometers (7.8 mi) south of the abandoned town of Mount Trumbull, Arizona on 25 May 1979.

The species name, distans, is Botanical Latin meaning "widely spaced", which refers to the spacing between groups of flowers on the stems. It is known by the common names Mount Trumbull penstemon and Mount Trumbull beardtongue.

== Range and habitat ==
Mount Trumbull penstemon is endemic to just Mohave County at the southeastern edge of the Shivwits Plateau in northeastern Arizona. There it grows in remote canyons such as Parashant Canyon and Whitmore Canyon. The estimated size of its range is 461 square kilometers (178 sq mi), but only eight populations have been documented in this area with a likely population of less than 30,000 plants in 2013. They are found between 1,200 and 1,600 meters (3,900 and 5,200 ft) in elevation. The species grows on gravelly slopes from Kaibab limestone and sandy soils of decomposed Hermit Shale in pinyon–juniper woodland. It is more often found in relatively cool and moist habitats on north or east facing slopes in the canyons.

=== Conservation ===
The species was evaluated by NatureServe in 2024 and rated imperiled at the global level. Though it can be locally abundant it is a very narrow endemic that is potentially threatened by mineral development and wildfires. Part of its population grows on land belonging to the Bureau of Land Management and subject to possible development.

== See also ==
List of Penstemon species
