= Grand Wash Cliffs =

Landform in Mohave County, Arizona, U.S.

- Cliffs
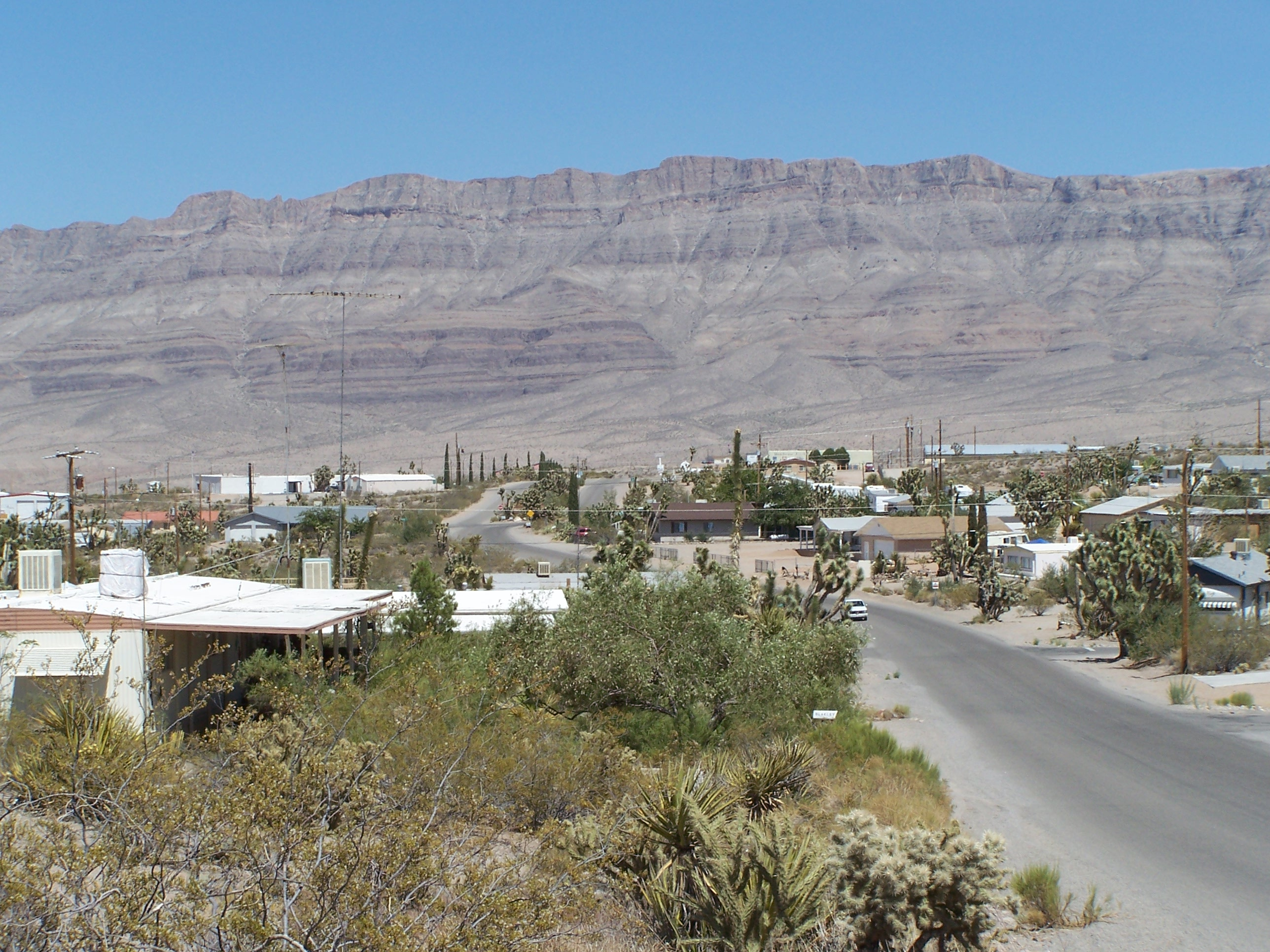
- Grand Wash Cliffs at Meadview, Arizona (view due-east)
- Interactive map of Grand Wash Cliffs
- Coordinates: 35.983°N 113.967°W
- Location: Mohave County, Arizona, Arizona, United States
- Formed by: Colorado River

Dimensions
  - Length: 115 ft (35 m)
  - Width: 5 ft (1.5 m)

Foothills of Grand Wash Cliffs (city-or-landform locations)

The Grand Wash Cliffs extend south-southeast from the Grand Canyon–Parashant National Monument in northwest Arizona west of the Shivwits Plateau south through the Grand Cliffs Wilderness and into the Lake Mead Recreation Area. The Grand Wash Cliffs cross the Grand Canyon where the Colorado River enters Lake Mead. To the south of the Grand Canyon the Grand Wash Cliffs continue past the east side of Grapevine Mesa and then southeast above and east of the Hualapai Valley forming the southwest margin of the Music Mountains.

== List of landforms/communities along Grand Wash Cliffs ==
(form north-to-south)

- Grand Wash Cliffs Wilderness (~north terminus) (Loc. dot 1)
- Squaw Canyon
- Pigeon Canyon
- Pearce Canyon
- Pearce Ferry, Lake Mead (at Colorado River)
- Meadview, Arizona (Grapevine Mesa, west, at foothills) (Loc. dot 2)
- Garnet Mountain (Loc. dot 3)
- Music Mountains (part of Hualapai Plateau elevations, east)
- Crozier, Arizona
- Valentine, Arizona (at south terminus) (Loc. dot 4)
- Peacock Mountains
- Cane Springs, Arizona (using Upper Burro Creek Wilderness coord.) (Loc. dot 5)
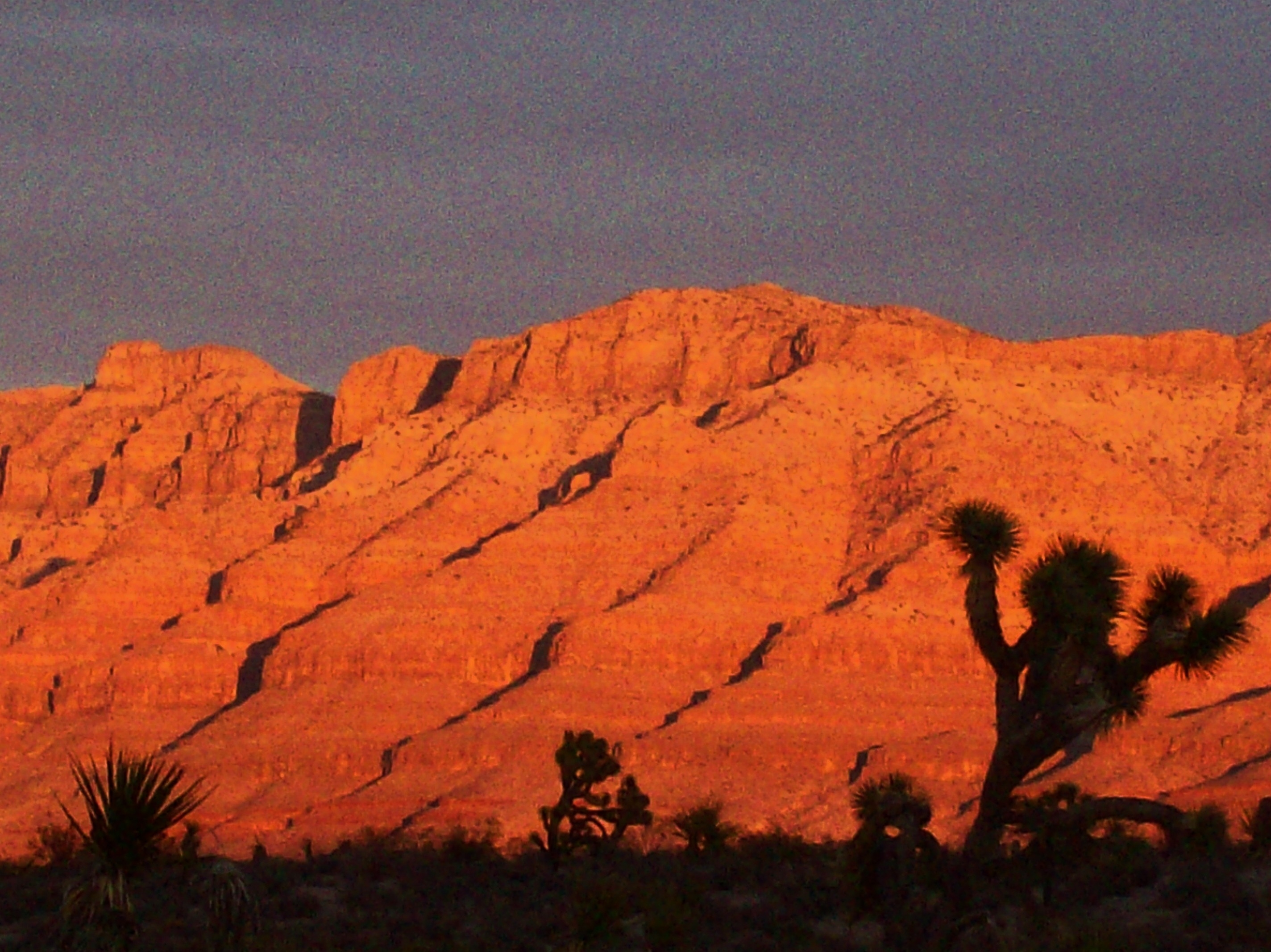
Sunset at Meadview with Joshua trees

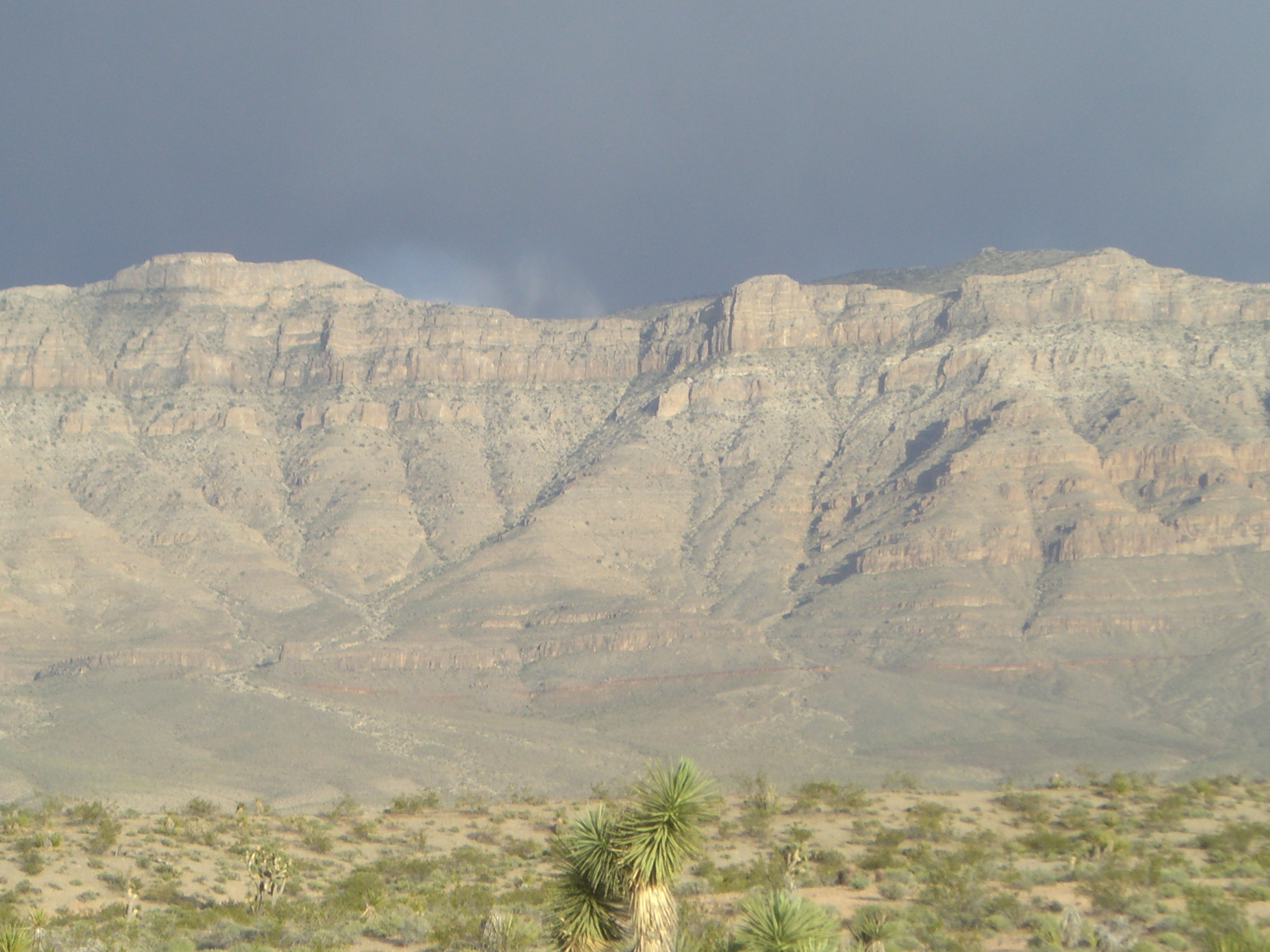
Cliffs, and foothills with Joshua Trees

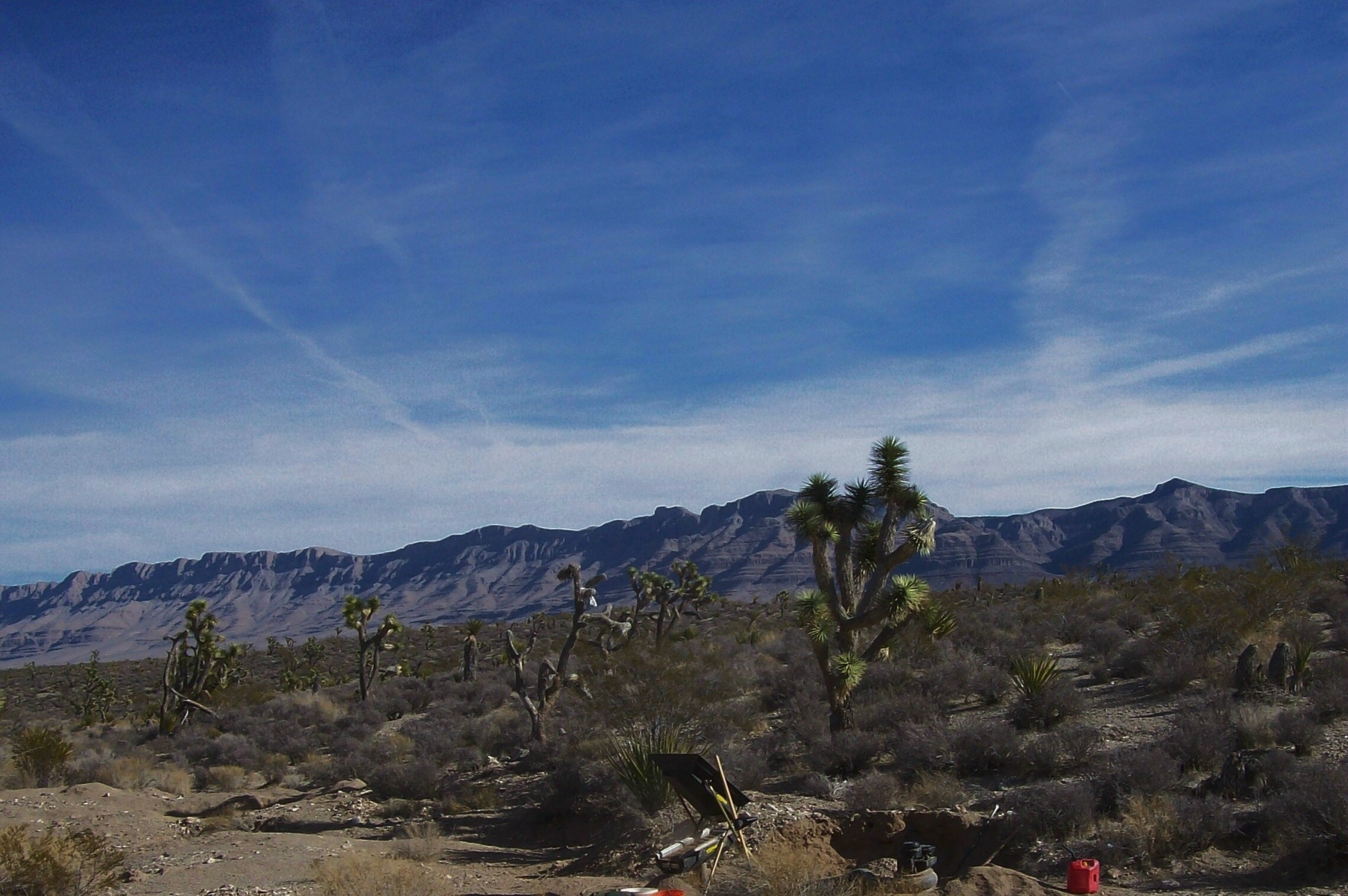
Grand Wash Cliffs, from Pierce Ferry Road

== See also ==
- Hurricane Cliffs
- Aubrey Cliffs
- Aubrey Valley
