= Union Line =

Union Line may mean:

- Union Company, also known as the Union Line and Union Steam Ship Company (USS Co), was started in Dunedin, New Zealand, in 1875.
- Union Line (Colorado River), a rival steamboat company to George A. Johnson & Company on the Colorado River 1864–1865.
- Union-Castle Line a British steamship line also called the Union Line.
