= Bonelli's Ferry =

Bonellis Ferry, Nevada
- Unincorporated community
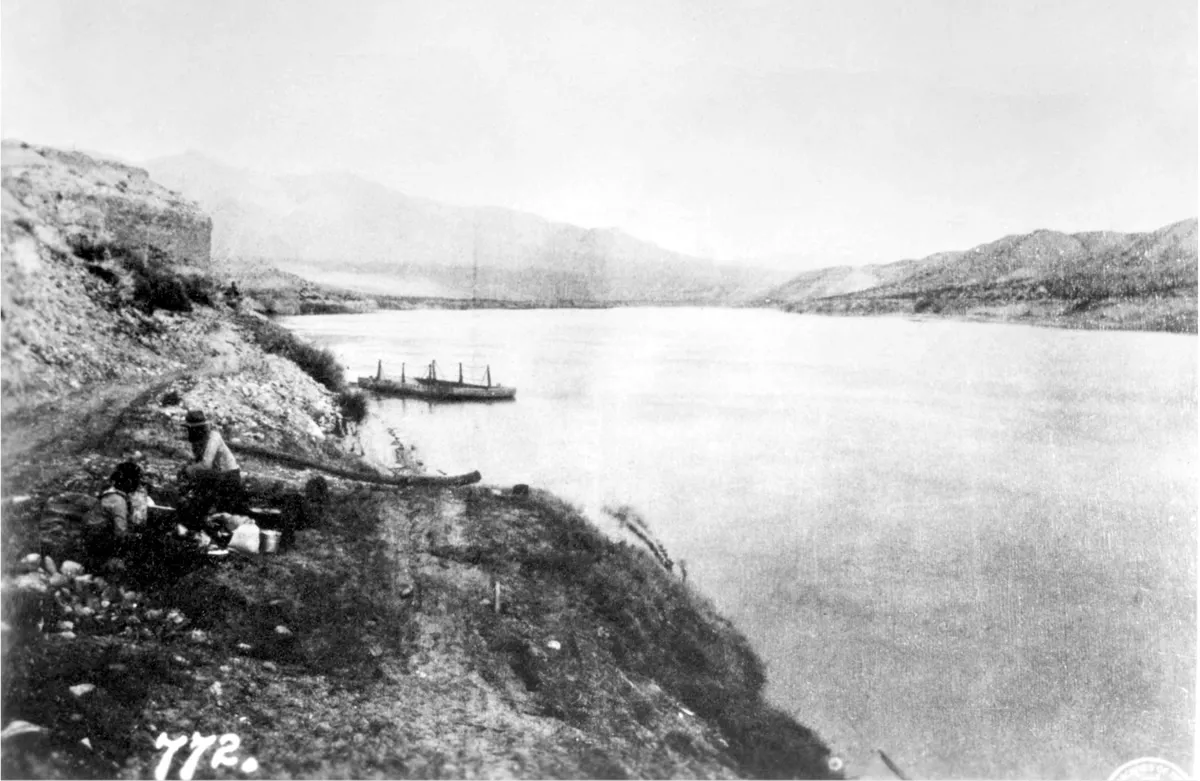
- View of the landing in 1890

- Location within the state of Nevada Bonellis Ferry, Nevada (the United States)
- Coordinates: 36°08′55″N 114°24′53″W
- Country: United States
- State: Nevada
- County: Clark
- Elevation: 1,204 ft (367 m)
- Time zone: UTC-8 (Pacific (PST))
  - Summer (DST): UTC-7 (PDT)
- GNIS feature ID: 863137

Bonelli's Ferry or Old Bonelli Ferry was a Colorado River ferry between Arizona and Nevada. It was located on the Colorado just above the Virgin River, near Junction City. The latter was later known as Rioville, Nevada in the late nineteenth century. Both the former sites of the ferry and of Rioville were submerged below Lake Mead, created by a dam on the Colorado River.

== History ==
Bonelli's Ferry replaced Stone's Ferry, 2 miles down river, which was a flatboat ferry established in 1871. Ferry rights were sold to James Thompson who, in 1870, sold them to Daniel Bonelli, a Swiss immigrant and member of the Church of Jesus Christ of Latter-day Saints from St. Thomas, Nevada.

Bonelli moved his ferry operation up river to near Junction City in 1876, at the mouth of the Virgin River. A wagon and 2 persons were charged $10.00 to cross, and $0.50 for each additional person.

The ferry connected the road to the mining camps like Cerbat and Mineral Park, and to the Hardyville - Prescott Road, in Mohave County, Arizona to the road to the settlements on the Muddy and Virgin Rivers in Nevada and Southwestern Utah that supplied the camps.

Bonelli's Ferry was destroyed by a flood in 1904, the same year that Daniel Bonelli died. His son rebuilt and ran the ferry at least until the 1920s. A ferry operated at this site until 1935, when Lake Mead began to rise behind a dam on the Colorado River.

== Today ==
The sites of Bonelli's Ferry and Rioville are now under Lake Mead.
