= Thomas Tilden =

Thomas Tilden may refer to:

- Tom Tilden, fictional character in Under the Dome
- Thomas Tilden of Philadelphia Silver and Copper Mining Company

== See also ==
- George Thomas Tilden
- Tilden family
