= White Hills (Arizona) =

Range of hills in Mohave County, Arizona

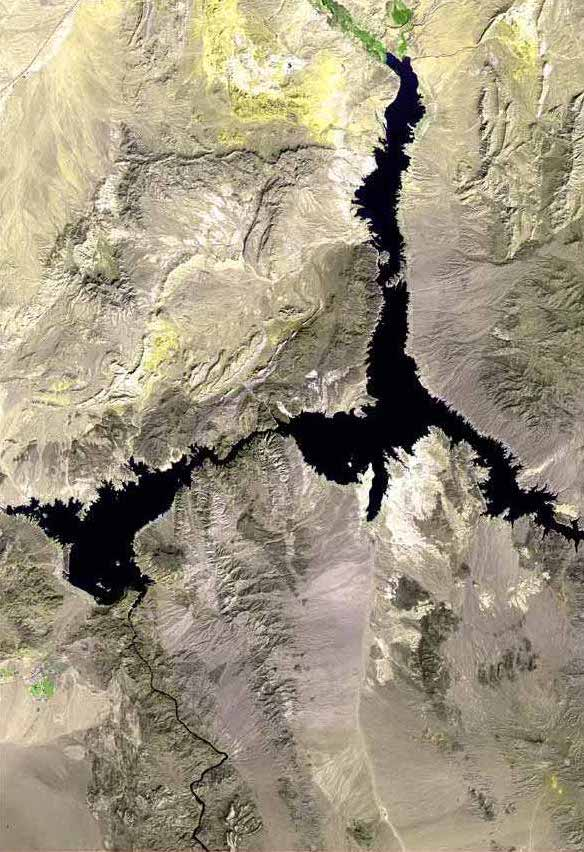
- White Hills-(north & central regions) at photo right (bright WHITE), adjacent Lake Mead

Highest point
- Peak: Table Mountain (Arizona), south, near terminus
- Elevation: 5,175 ft (1,577 m)
- Coordinates: 35°49′43″N 114°18′58″W

Dimensions
- Length: 28 mi (45 km) N-S
- Width: 11 mi (18 km) E-W (variable)

Geography
- Location within Arizona
- Country: United States
- State: Arizona
- Region: Mojave Desert
- County: Mohave
- Communities: White Hills, Arizona, Temple Bar, Arizona and Dolan Springs, Arizona
- Borders on: Lake Mead, Colorado River, Lake Mead National Recreation Area, Grapevine Mesa, Hualapai Valley, Cerbat Mountains, Mount Tipton Wilderness, Detrital Valley and Black Mountains (Arizona)

The White Hills are a range of hills in northern Mohave County, Arizona. These hills lie north of the Cerbat Mountains and extend south from the Colorado River at Lake Mead between the Detrital Valley to the west and the Gold Basin and the upper Hualapai Valley to the east. The north region of the White Hills is located in Lake Mead National Recreation Area.

The White Hills occur in a north, central, and south region. The approximate mountain range center is slightly northeast of White Hills, Arizona, the Senator Mountain, 5,127 feet (1,563 m).

== History ==
The west side of the White Hills were the site of a silver rush in 1892. It resulted in the establishment of the boomtown of White Hills, in Arizona Territory, twenty miles east of the steamboat landing at Eldorado Canyon.
