= Mount Tipton =

Landform in Mohave County, Arizona, U.S.

- Location within Arizona

Highest point
- Elevation: 7,153 ft (2,180 m) NAVD 88
- Prominence: 3,628 ft (1,106 m)
- Listing: Desert Peaks Section List
- Coordinates: 35°32′20″N 114°11′34″W

Geography
- Location: Mohave County, Arizona, U.S.
- Parent range: Cerbat Mountains
- Topo map: USGS Mount Tipton

Mount Tipton is a mountain in northwestern Arizona in the United States. With a summit elevation of 7,153 feet (2,180 m), it is the tallest mountain in the Cerbat Mountains which border Kingman on the north, and is the high point of the Mount Tipton Wilderness which comprises the entirety of the northern portion of the Cerbat Mountains. The community of Dolan Springs lies west at the base of Mount Tipton at the northwest side of the Cerbat Range.

== See also ==
- Cerbat Mountains
- List of mountain ranges of Arizona
