= Detrital Valley =

Landform in Mohave County, Arizona

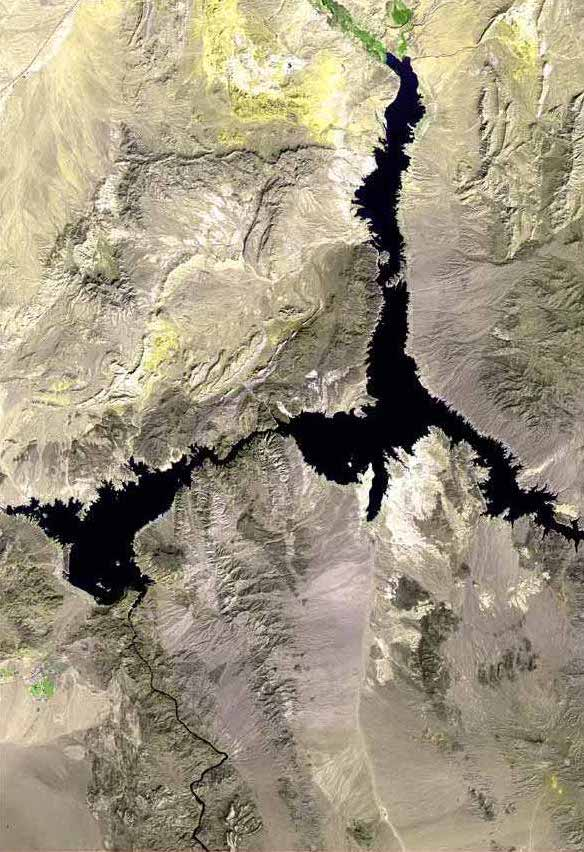
- Detrital Valley, between Black Mountains (west), and White Hills (east).
- Length: 51 mi (82 km) N-S (arced to West)
- Width: 10 mi (16 km)

Geography
- Country: United States
- State: Arizona
- Communities: Bonelli Landing; Dolan Springs; Grasshopper Junction
- Borders on: List: Black Mountains (Arizona); Lake Mead; White Hills (Arizona); Cerbat Mountains; Sacramento Valley (Arizona)
- Lake: Lake Mead
- Interactive map of Detrital Valley

The Detrital Valley is a 51-mi (82 km) long valley in northwest Mohave County, Arizona that drains into Lake Mead. It is parallel to the valley just east, Hualapai Valley with the White Hills (Arizona) being the divider between.

Detrital Valley contains Detrital Wash which drains the entire valley, from just north of Kingman, Arizona, specifically at the water divide near Grasshopper Junction, Arizona, where the drainage runs southwards (then west to the Colorado River), the valley being the Sacramento Valley (Arizona). Unlike Detrital Valley, neighboring Hualapai Valley only drains its north region into Lake Mead; most of Hualapai Valley is endorheic, creating the ephemeral lake of Red Lake.

The center of Detrital Valley parallels the lengthy north-south range on its west border, the Black Mountains (Arizona), and is located at Boulder Inn, the junction road, Temple Bar Road, to Temple Bar, Lake Mead-(opposite Bonelli Landing across Bonelli Bay, a sub-bay); the junction is with U.S. Route 93 which traverses much of the valley from Kingman, to Hoover Dam.

== See also ==
- Lake Mead National Recreation Area
- Sacramento Valley & Wash
