= Mohave II =

Colorado River stern-wheel steamboat

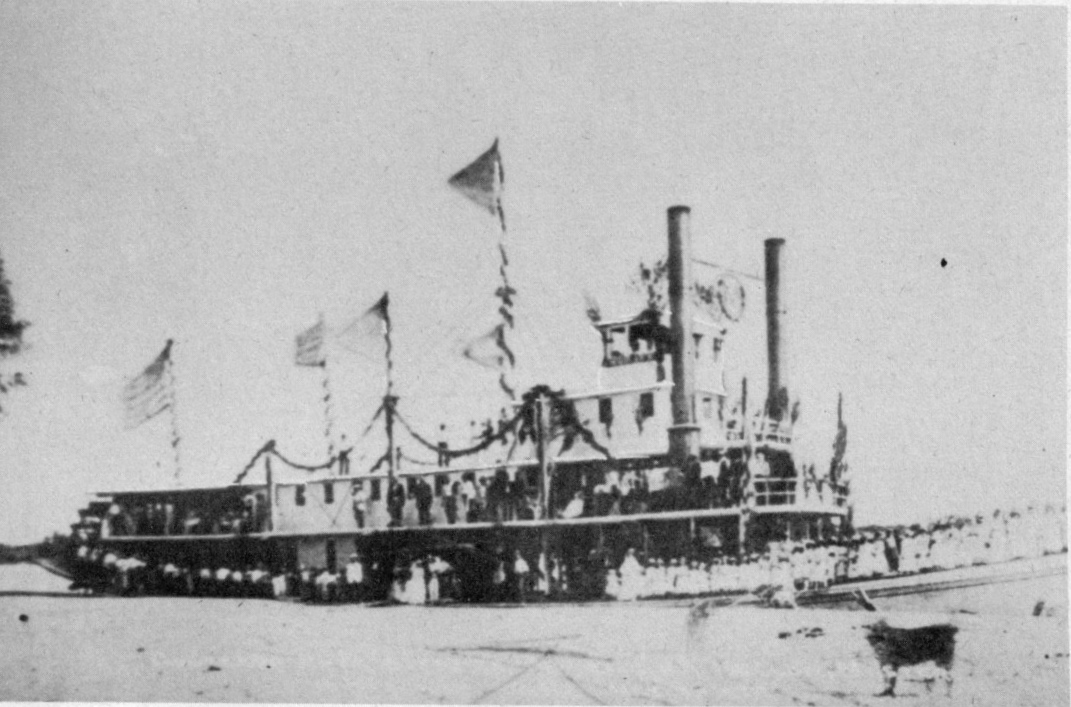
Mohave II at Yuma, Arizona, with Sunday school group embarked, 1876.

Mohave, the second stern-wheel steamboat of that name running on the Colorado River for the Colorado Steam Navigation Company (C.S.N.C) between 1875 and 1876. It was the first and only double smokestack steamboat to run on the river.

== History ==
The Mohave II was built to replace the worn out Mohave I that had been towing barges from 1865 until 1875 when the worn out boat was hauled out of the river and dismantled at Port Isabel. She was replaced in 1876 by the largest steamboat ever on the Colorado River, the double stacked, stern-wheeler Mohave II. The company chose the same builder that made the Gila, San Francisco, shipbuilder Patrick Henry Tiernan. He built her in San Francisco and had her taken apart, and shipped to the shipyard of Port Isabel, Sonora, at the mouth of the Colorado River. There she was reassembled and launched in May 1876. The Mohave II weighed 188 tons, was 149.5 feet in length, 31.5 feet abeam, and in addition to being longer and broader, half a foot shallower than the Gila, drawing only a foot of water which permitted her to venture farther into the sloughs and shallows than any other boat. In 1881, she reached Rioville, Nevada, highest point of steam navigation on the lower Colorado, under her captain Joseph H. Godfrey, nephew of Issac Polhamus. In outer appearance she looked like one of the palatial river boats of the Mississippi River, but within had few of the luxurious accommodations of those vessels and was instead a working boat, towing barges up and down river. Nevertheless, she was a favorite excursion boat over the years of her service.

== Fate of the Mohave II ==
In the face of competition from rival steamboat companies, the owners of C.S.N.C, Issac Polhamus and Jack Mellon had the engine of the old Gila taken out in put in a new boat the 135 foot long Cochan that began work on the river carrying freight for the Searchlight mines in January 1900. At the same time the old Mohave II was stripped of its machinery and was run into Jaeger's Slough and left to decay.
