= Jaeger's Slough =

Jaeger's Slough, was a former course of the Colorado River, reduced to a slough sometime before 1849. It ran from its head on the north or California) bank of the river, from the main channel, that at that time ran two or three miles northwest and then east of Fort Yuma. The slough rejoined the river at its mouth nearly a mile west of Fort Yuma. The slough can be seen on Lieutenant Amiel Weeks Whipple's 1849 map "Map of a Survey and Reconnaissance of the Vicinity of the Mouth of the Rio Gila". The map shows two Quechan villages along either side of the slough. The slough would have flooded in the high water months of May and June and then been planted with crops as the water receded, the common practice of the native people along the Colorado River.

Jaeger's Ferry and Jaeger City were later located just west of the mouth of this slough. In January 1900, the Mohave II, stripped of its machinery, was run into the slough and left to decay. Subsequent course changes of the Colorado cut it off from the river. Some of its course has been used for canals. A remnant of it at its mouth, remains as an inlet on the north bank of the river across from Yuma, Arizona at 32°43′50″N 114°37′45″W.
