= Cerbat, Arizona =

Ghost town in Mohave County

- Ghost town
- Location within Arizona Location within the United States
- Coordinates: 35°18′11″N 114°08′23″W
- Country: United States
- State: Arizona
- County: Mohave
- Founded: 1860s
- Elevation: 3,865 ft (1,178 m)
- Time zone: UTC-7 (MST (no DST))
- Post Office Opened: December 23, 1872
- Post Office Closed: June 15, 1912

Cerbat is a ghost town just west of the Cerbat Mountains in Mohave County, Arizona, United States. Mining in the area began in the late 1860s and a camp was established soon after. Cerbat was built in a canyon 38 miles (61 km) from Hardyville. The town was prosperous and contained several mining and public buildings, along with cabins for over 100 settlers, as well as a school, a doctor's office and a lawyer's office. In the 1870s the town was connected by dirt road to Fort Rock, Camp Hualapai and Prescott. Cerbat was the third seat of Mohave County until 1877 when Mineral Park took the title.

As of 2010, a cemetery and a few wooden buildings and stone foundations, including a large mill and the post office, remain. The post office was completed on December 23, 1872, and was closed on June 15, 1912. From June 25, 1890, to October 24, 1902, the town was known as Campbell.
