= Mount Tipton Wilderness =

Protected area in Mohave County, Arizona

- IUCN category Ib (wilderness area)
- Location within the United States
- Location: Mohave County, Arizona, US
- Nearest city: Dolan Springs, Arizona
- Coordinates: 35°32′19″N 114°11′28″W
- Area: 30,760 acres (124 km^{2})
- Established: 1990
- Governing body: U.S. Bureau of Land Management

The Mount Tipton Wilderness is a 30,760-acre (124.5 km^{2}) wilderness area in the U.S. state of Arizona. It is located in northwestern Arizona and comprises the north portion of the Cerbat Mountains; the Cerbat Mountains extend 23 miles (37 km) northwesterly from the northern edge of Kingman.

Mount Tipton at 7,148 feet (2,179 m) is the highest peak of the Mount Tipton Wilderness. The nearest access point to the wilderness is the Dolan Springs community located on the northwest flank of the Cerbat Mountains and directly west of the wilderness area. Five access routes are described for the wilderness.

Besides hiking trails during seasonally good weather, attractions of the wilderness are wild mustang horses. Besides the peak at Mount Tipton, the Cerbat Pinnacles is a rockscape attraction on the north of the Cerbat Mountains. Some vegetation species found in the wilderness are, a Ponderosa Pine stand on Mount Tipton; also pinon pine, manzanita, and ceanothus; this is part of a piñon-juniper woodland.

== See also ==
- List of Arizona Wilderness Areas
- List of LCRV Wilderness Areas (Colorado River)
- List of U.S. Wilderness Areas
- Wilderness Act
