= Rioville, Nevada =

American now-submerged settlement (1869–circa 1934)

- Location within Arizona

Geography
- Coordinates: 36°9′0″N 114°23′57″W
- Interactive map of Rioville, Nevada

Rioville (first known as Junction City) was a settlement founded by Latter-day Saints in what they thought was Utah Territory in 1869, now under Lake Mead and within Clark County, Nevada.

== History ==
Junction City, was located on the Colorado River, above its confluence with the Virgin River (also known as the Rio Virgin). Stone's Ferry was purchased in 1870 and moved to a location adjacent to Junction City in 1876 and renamed Bonelli's Ferry after its new owner Daniel Bonelli.

After being deserted by its first Mormon settlers in 1871, new settlers came in the 1880s, and renamed the town Rioville. It had its own post office from 1881-1906.

On July 8, 1879, Rioville became the uppermost landing for steamboats of the Colorado River, when Captain Jack Mellon piloted the steamboat Gila up river through Boulder Canyon to the town, making it the high water head of navigation on the Colorado River. From then until 1887 when silver mining activity declined, steamboats in high water, and from 1879 to 1882 the sloop Sou'Wester in low water, carried locally mined salt to process silver ore in El Dorado Canyon. By the 1890s the settlement was virtually abandoned but the post office lingered to 1906 and the ferry until 1934.

== Present day ==
The site of Rioville has been submerged under Lake Mead since the 1930s.

== See also ==
- Steamboat transport on the Colorado River
