= Major Powell (steamboat) =

Twin screw driven steamboat

Major Powell was a 3-ton, twin-screw-driven steamboat built and launched in 1891 on the Green River at Green River, Utah, in August 1891.

== Details ==
Major Powell's owner was the Green Grand & Colorado River Navigation Company headed by B. S. Ross. The company was formed to run a line of excursion steamers down the Green River to its conjunction with the Colorado River and four miles down the Colorado as far as the first cataract at the head of Cataract Canyon, to a hotel to be built for tourists. The Major Powell was 35 feet long and 8 feet abeam, with a 26 inch draft. It had an open deck covered by a canvas canopy. Its two 6 horsepower steam engines were coal-fired, each driving one of the twin screws.

At first a failure on its first trial run after its launch due to the screws being struck by rocks in the fast moving and shallow water, the screws were afterward protected by iron guards, which enabled its success in its first voyage under the command of a local rancher Arthur Wheeler. Leaving April 15, 1882 the Major Powell descended to the Colorado River on the Green River, through Labyrinth Canyon and Stillwater Canyon and then down to the first cataract below the confluence with the Green River. Under-powered it barely made headway against the current of the Green River on its return journey on this first voyage and ran low on coal, forcing the crew to tie it up at Wheeler's ranch, 22 miles below Green River on the river and travel over land to announce their success at that town on July 3, 1892.

A second voyage down river was made, after the Major Powell was converted to using wood for fuel. This voyage took a month to complete, however it took only 4 days of that time to make the round trip on the river between Wheeler's ranch and the first cataract of the Colorado. Much of the rest of the time was spent obtaining the cottonwood logs to fire the engine. However despite these two successes, the Major Powell was dismantled in 1894 for its machinery, its hull left, to be washed away in the next flood.
