= Gila (sternwheeler) =

Stern-wheel steamboat of the Colorado Steam Navigation Company

Gila, a stern-wheel steamboat of the Colorado Steam Navigation Company running on the Colorado River between 1873 and 1899.

== History ==
The Gila came to be built by the Colorado Steam Navigation Company as a replacement for the old Opposition steamboat, "Nina Tilden" that had been on the river since August 1864. George Alonzo Johnson had it acquired after the creditors of the rival Arizona Navigation Company could not be salvaged from bankruptcy in the fall of 1867. By 1872 the Nina Tilden was wearing out. To build the new steamboat, the company chose San Francisco, shipbuilder Patrick Henry Tiernan. The 236-ton Gila was 149 feet long, with a 31-foot beam. It drew only 16.5 inches with a 3.8 foot deep hull. Knocked down the Gila was shipped to Port Isabel, Sonora, and reassembled and launched there under the direction of veteran Captain David C. Robinson in January 1873.

In 1879, after the California Steam Navigation Company was purchased by the owners of the Southern Pacific Railroad, the Gila was under charter to Joseph Wharton, whose company had just consolidated most of the mines in Eldorado Canyon. Gila was captained by Jack Mellon, who after bringing up machinery to the canyon was ordered to make the attempt to steam up the Colorado River, through the uncharted Boulder Canyon to the mouth of the Virgin River at Rioville where the salt needed for the reduction of silver ore there was mined. Leaving at 8:30 a.m. on 7 July, Mellon tied up that evening at the deserted town of Callville, then the following day was able to negotiate the hazards of Boulder Canyon to his destination, to the amazement of the Mormon population at Rioville. Jack Mellon finally proved that the Virgin River was indeed the head of steam navigation on the Colorado River, that Johnson, Ives, and Trueworthy before him had all believed but had failed to reach. During the next eight years the Gila went up the Virgin River to Rioville 22 times to get salt for the Eldorado Canyon mills.

== Fate of the Gila ==
After 35 years on the Colorado River the old "Gila" was rebuilt as the Cochan, in 1899. It continued to on the river until steam navigation ended in 1909.
