= Pearce Ferry, Lake Mead =

Location on the Grand Canyon, Arizona

Coordinates: 36°6′54.49″N 113°59′48.79″W

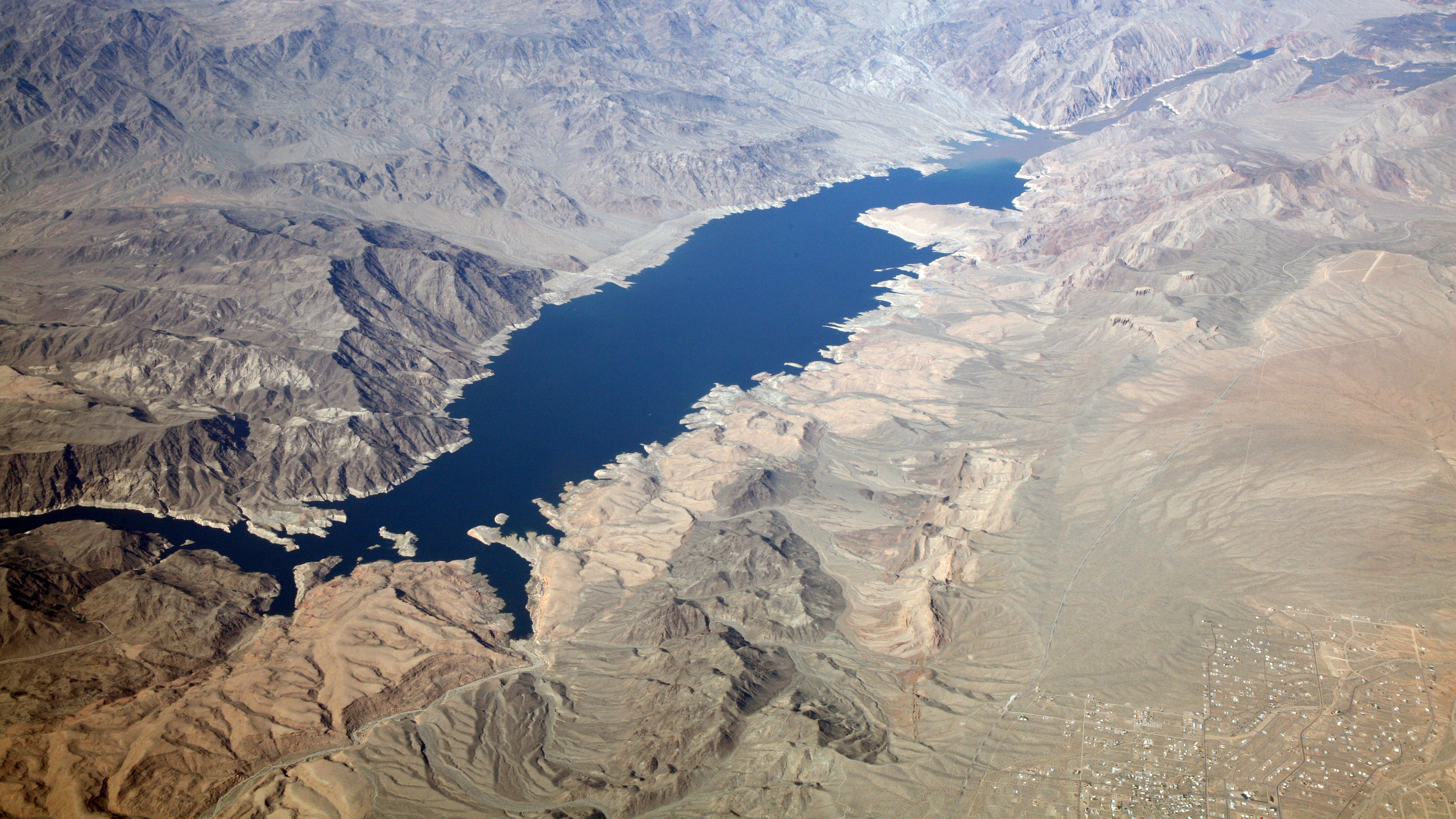
Pearce Ferry & upper Lake Mead. Meadview, Arizona at lower right, Hualapai Indian Reservation upper right. 2012 photo by Doc Searls

Pearce Ferry (sometimes misspelled Pierce Ferry) marks the boundary between Lake Mead and the Grand Canyon, where the low sandy banks around the lake give way to imposing, colorfully layered cliffs that enclose the Colorado River for the next 277 miles upstream. Lake Mead, and all of its points of interest, is managed by the National Park Service and available to the public for recreational purposes. A ferry was operated here by the Pearce family starting around 1876.

== Location ==
The ferry is located at the end of the 52-mile Dolan Spring Road, starting from US Route 93 halfway between the Hoover Dam and Kingman. This road is also the access to Meadview, Arizona.

== Fish species ==
- Largemouth bass
- Striped bass
- Crappie
- Sunfish
- Channel catfish
- Carp
