= Mexican-Colorado Navigation Company =

Mexican-Colorado Navigation Company was a steam navigation company formed in Los Angeles, California, that operated on the Colorado River from 1901 to 1907. It was owned by Alphonso B. Smith, W. S. Twogood, and E. E. Busby. It ran the steamboats, Retta (1900-1905), St. Vallier (1901-1907), and San Jorge (1901), from Yuma, Arizona.
