= Shivwits Plateau =

Landform in northwest Arizona

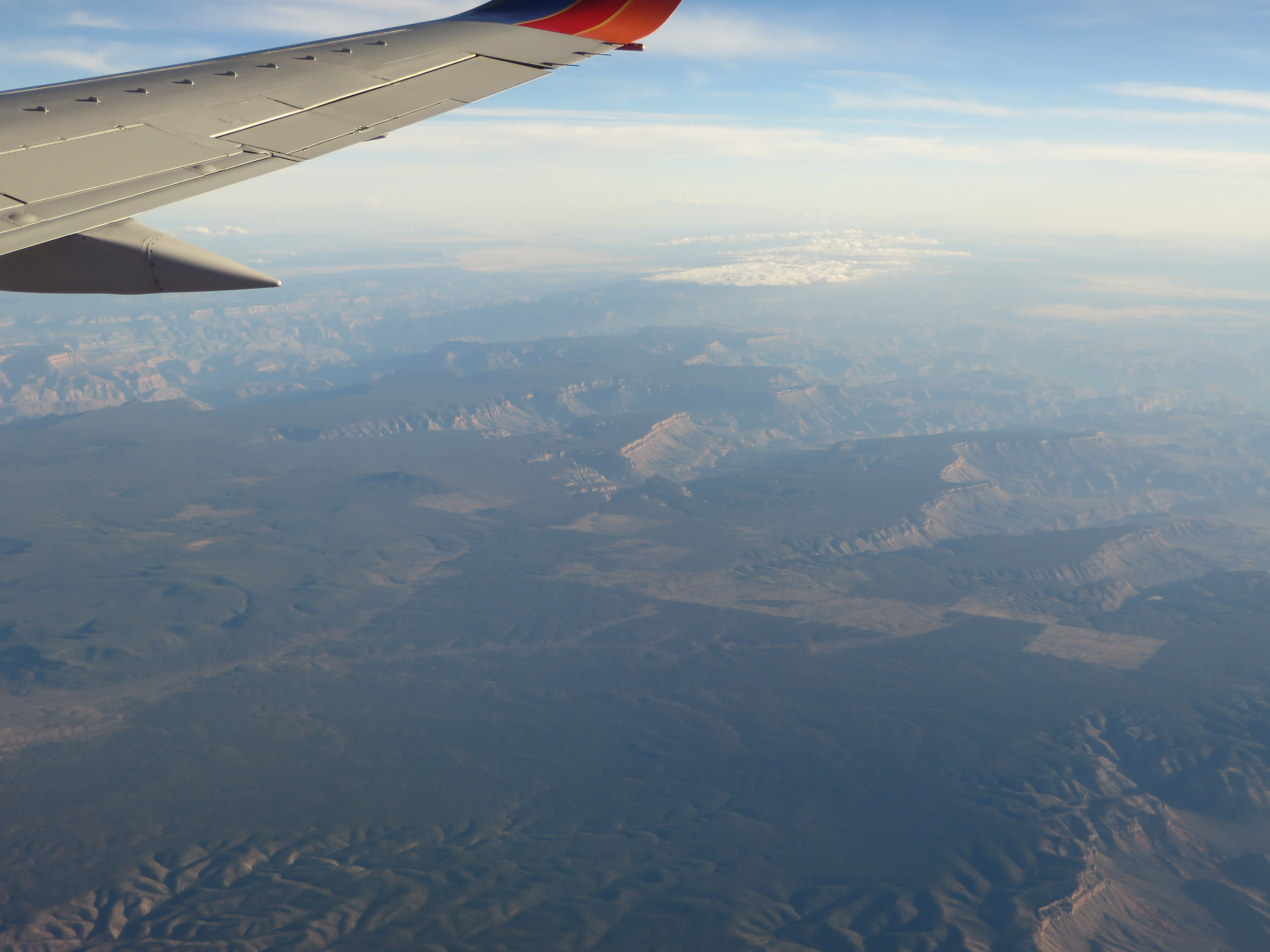
- Shivwits Plateau, southeast terminus

- Location within Arizona
- Length: 50 mi (80 km) NW to SE
- Width: 23 mi (37 km) E-W (at southeast terminus)

Geography
- Country: United States
- State: Arizona
- Region: Grand Canyon-Parashant National Monument; Grand Canyon
- District: Mohave County, Arizona
- Communities: Littlefield, Arizona; Peach Springs, Arizona
- Borders on: Hurricane Cliffs-E; Colorado River and Aubrey Cliffs-E to SE; Peach Springs, Arizona-S (Sanup Plateau)-(southwest border); Colorado River and (southwest)- Hualapai Indian Reservation-SW; Grand Wash Cliffs-W and NW; Grand Wash Cliffs Wilderness-WNW; Virgin Mountains-NNW; Black Rock Mountain & Paiute Wilderness
- Coordinates: 36°25′00″N 113°30′04″W
- River: Colorado River
- Interactive map of Shivwits Plateau

The Shivwits Plateau is a large plateau in northwest Arizona, and in the northwest of the Grand Canyon region. Just like the Kaibab Plateau in the east Grand Canyon forces the course of the Colorado River encircling it, the Shivwits Plateau is the major course changer of the Colorado in west Grand Canyon. The Colorado River goes due-south on the east perimeter of the plateau, goes west, then northwest to its outfall at Lake Mead. The southwest of the plateau borders the Colorado, but a lower elevation section is directly riverside; it is lower elevation hills and small canyons, called Sanup Plateau, and bordering the section of the Colorado called the Lower Granite Gorge. (The Lower Granite Gorge starts on the east side at the start of its due-south excursion around Shivwits Plateau.)

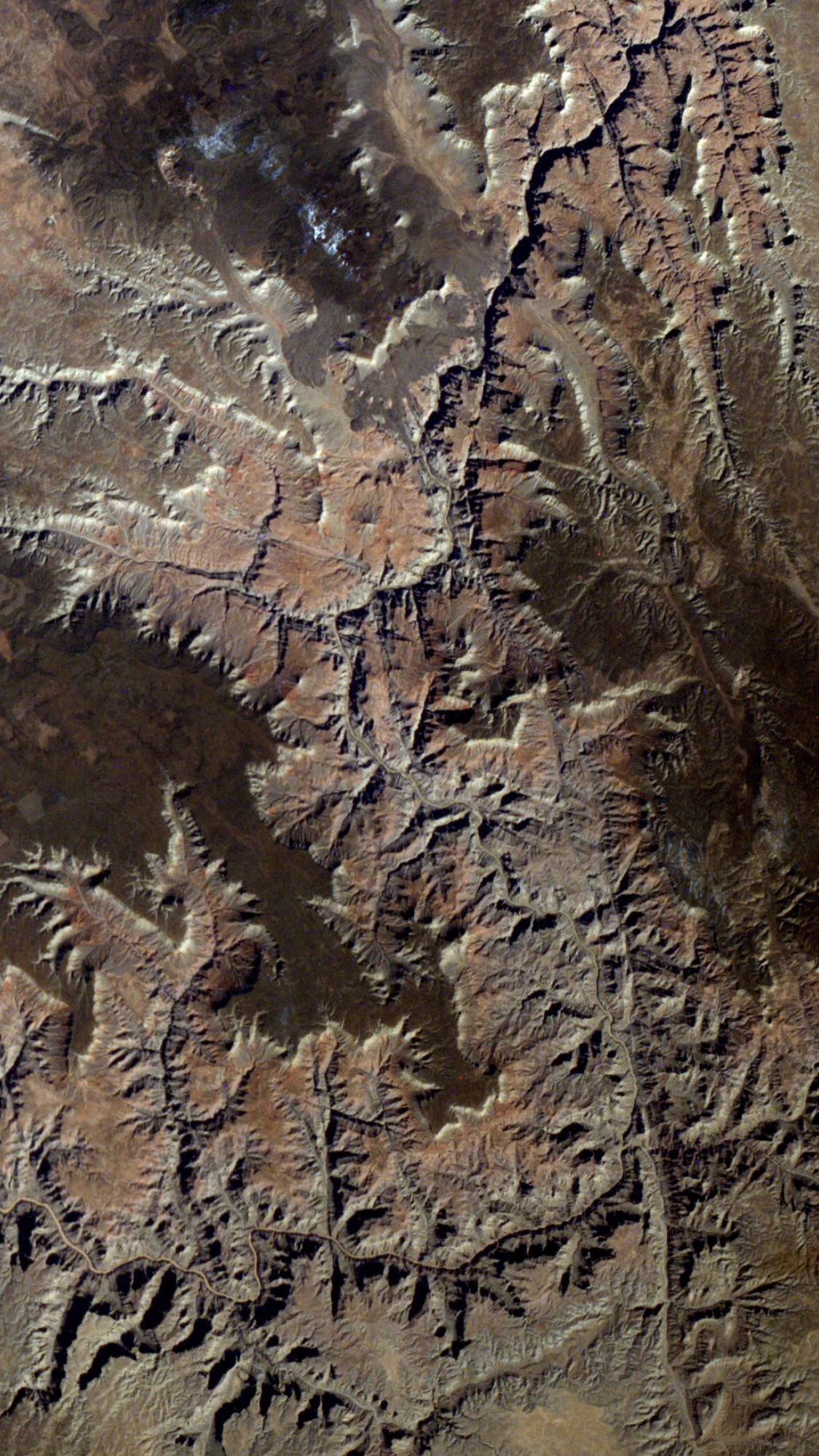
(forested)-Shivwits Plateau, (center-left)

The Shivwits Plateau is named for the Shivwits section of the Paiute Indian tribes. The plateau is also one of the major areas of the Grand Canyon-Parashant National Monument that is bordered by the Lake Mead National Recreation Area (west), the Hualapai Indian Reservation (southeast), and Grand Canyon National Park (east).

== Geography ==
The southwest, south, and southeast around the plateau is composed of the Hualapai Indian Reservation along the course of the Colorado River, the section named the Lower Granite Gorge. The north section is enclosed within Grand Canyon National Park and the Grand Canyon-Parashant National Monument.

The Hurricane Cliffs are on the east and the Grand Wash Cliffs are at the west.

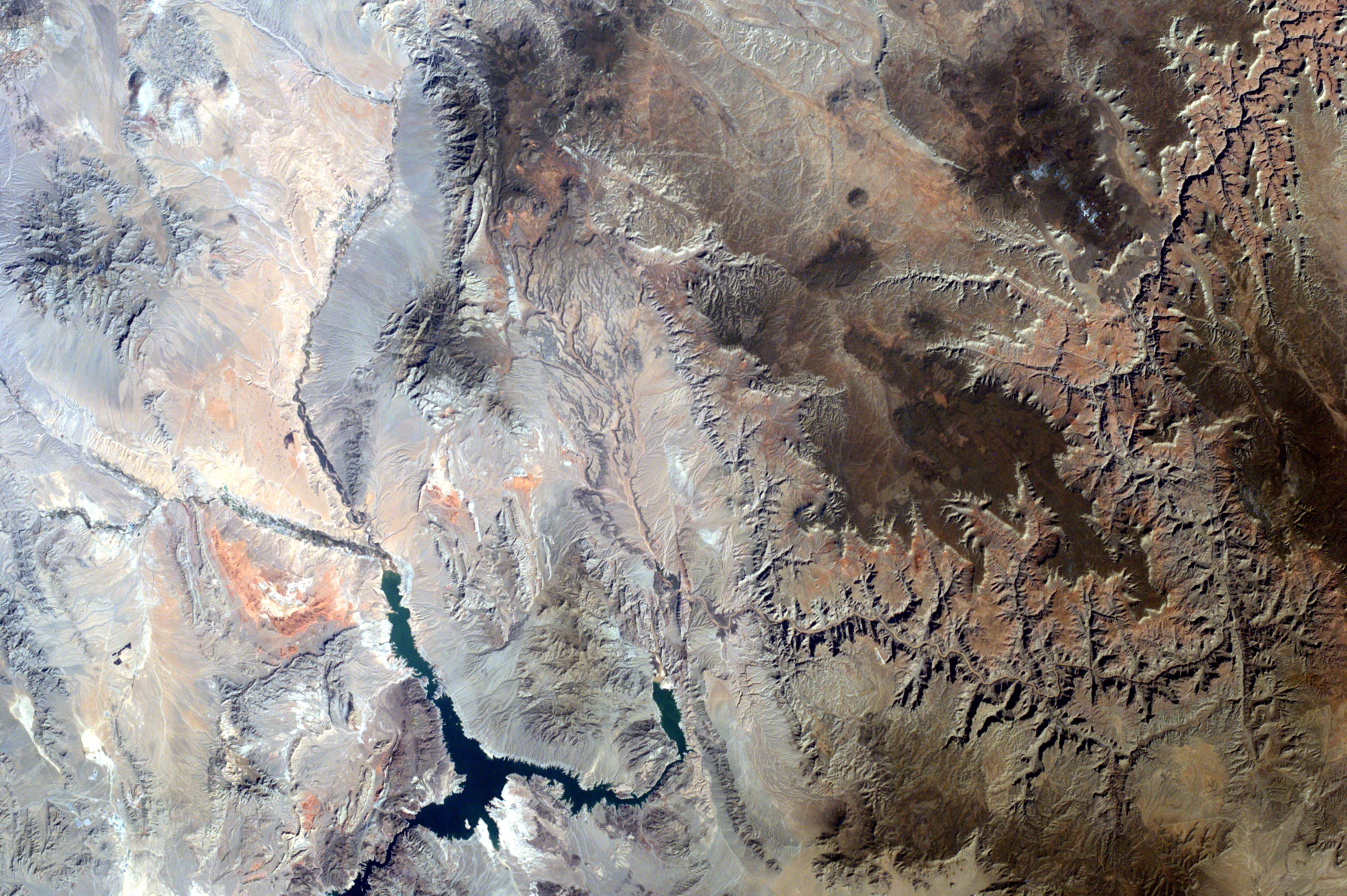
View from space: The excursion of the Colorado River around the Shivwits Plateau. (about 50-mi from Lake Mead)

== See also ==
- Grand Canyon-Parashant National Monument
