= Esmerelda (sternwheeler) =

Stern-wheel paddle-steamer

Esmerelda, was a stern-wheel paddle-steamer, built for the Sacramento River trade, in 1864 it became the first of the opposition steamboats on the Colorado River. It was also the first steamboat to tow large cargo barges on that river, in May 1864 and to reach Callville, Nevada in 1866.

== History ==
Esmerelda was built in San Francisco at the 3rd Street shipyard of Patrick Henry Tiernan at Steamboat Point in 1862 for Captain Washington Pitts. It was a stern wheeler, 100 feet long, 24 feet by the beam, hold 3.5 feet deep.

In 1864, the Esmerelda was now owned by the Union Line of Captain Thomas E. Trueworthy. He sent her and the Victoria, a four-masted schooner converted from a barge, under Captain Charles C. Overman, to the Colorado River to establish the Union Line as the opposition line to George A. Johnson & Company there. The Victoria was to be a store ship at the mouth of the river, but she was soon broken up by the tidal bore soon after it reached the mouth of the Colorado in March.

After Overman arrived at the river he built the Black Crook, first tow barge to be used on the Colorado River. Of a type commonly used on the San Francisco Bay and Sacramento River and its tributaries, the barge was 128 x 28 feet capable of carrying 100 tons of freight. These barges were towed on a 100-foot cable secured to a short mast atop the steamboat amid-ship to avoid fouling with the stern-wheel. Each barge had a helmsman that steered the barge in the wake of the boat towing it. In early May Trueworthy took the Esmerelda up river for the first time with the Black Crook in tow making it to Fort Yuma in three days, eight hours.

With the addition of the other opposition steamer "Nina Tilden" and a third Johnson steamer the "Mohave" in furious competition, the backlog of freight that had stimulated the creation of the rival steamboat companies went away by the fall of 1864. The only new business to be had by the opposition was to service the settlements Utah, up river at a landing Callville cutting costs of transportation by $100 a ton, on third of the cost of the overland route from Los Angeles. Trueworthy proposed to do this at all times of the year, and tried to take the Esmerelda there in 1865, towing a barge loaded with merchandise and timber, but turned back at the Roaring Rapids in Black Canyon, to tie up his boat at El Dorado Canyon and sell his cargo. Johnson associate William Harrison Hardy had succeeded in getting there first, leaving January 2, poling and sailing (when the wind was favorable) a 50 by 8 foot flat boat "Arizona" 90 miles from Hardyville to Callville in 12 days.

In the summer of 1865, Esmerelda was consolidated with the other rival boat, into the Pacific and Colorado Steam Navigation Company, also headed by Thomas E. Trueworthy, with backing from San Francisco financiers. Trueworthy tried again to reach Callville during the high water in the summer of 1866. Esmeralda with a barge and ninety tons of freight, under Trueworthy's former first mate Captain Robert T. Rogers. After three months, the Esmeralda reached the landing at Callville on October 8, 1866. She was slowed by lack of firewood and at became known as the Ringbolt Rapids, with insufficient power to ascend the rapids, a ringbolt had had to be set in the canyon wall and the boat pulled through with a line run to her capstan. Despite her triumph at reaching the new "head of navigation" at Callvile, Esmerelda was seized by the Sheriff of Yuma County, for debts owned by Thomas E. Trueworthy's company, and passed through the hands of Arizona Navigation Company, another company the creditors tried to form hoping to salvage the opposition steamboat business. This failing, Esmerelda was sold in the fall of 1867, to George A. Johnson & Company, that had the boat dismantled 1868.
