= Mohave I =

19th-century steamboat

Mohave was the first stern-wheel steamboat of that name running on the Colorado River between 1864 and 1875.

== History ==
The Mohave came to be built by the George A. Johnson Company in response to a challenge to their monopoly of the Colorado River trade. Discontent by miners and merchants in upriver mines and settlements over high prices and shortages arose in late 1863. A lack of adequate shipping on the part of the company to carry the volume of cargo caused by the Colorado River mining boom had slowed delivery of goods upriver from the ships in the estuary of the Colorado. Additionally steamboat captains were profiteering on the resulting shortages brought on by this bottleneck in the supply chain. The consequence was the arrival of the sternwheeler Esmerelda for the Union Line, the first "Opposition Line", on the river.

George Alonzo Johnson, who had neglected to deal with the building crisis, finally took action and had a third boat built by famed shipbuilder John G. North. North built it at his shipyard in San Francisco in sections and brought it down to the estuary, where it was assembled and launched in late May 1864. The 193 ton Mohave was 135 feet long and 29 feet by the beam with a 4 foot deep hull.

The power of its engines and cargo carrying capacity was illustrated by its May 27 – June 6, 1866 run upriver 365 miles to El Dorado Canyon from Yuma, under the command of Captain Issac Polhamus. She carried 225 tons of cargo in a record time of ten days and two hours despite being slowed for four days out of the ten, where the captain made only 41 miles against the strong current of the spring rise of the river. To do it Polhamus had to transfer the cargo off the two barges he was towing, on board his boat, and leave the barges behind.

== Fate of the Mohave ==
The Mohave continued to run the river, towing barges from 1865 until 1875, when the worn out boat was hauled out of the river at Port Isabel. She was dismantled there and her machinery was sent back to equip the Sacramento River stern-wheeler, Onward, a longer, heavier steamboat, being built in San Francisco in 1877 and which ran until 1909. The first Mohave was replaced in 1876 by the largest steamboat ever on the Colorado River, the double stacked, stern-wheeler Mohave II.
