= Hualapai Valley =

Valley in Arizona, United States

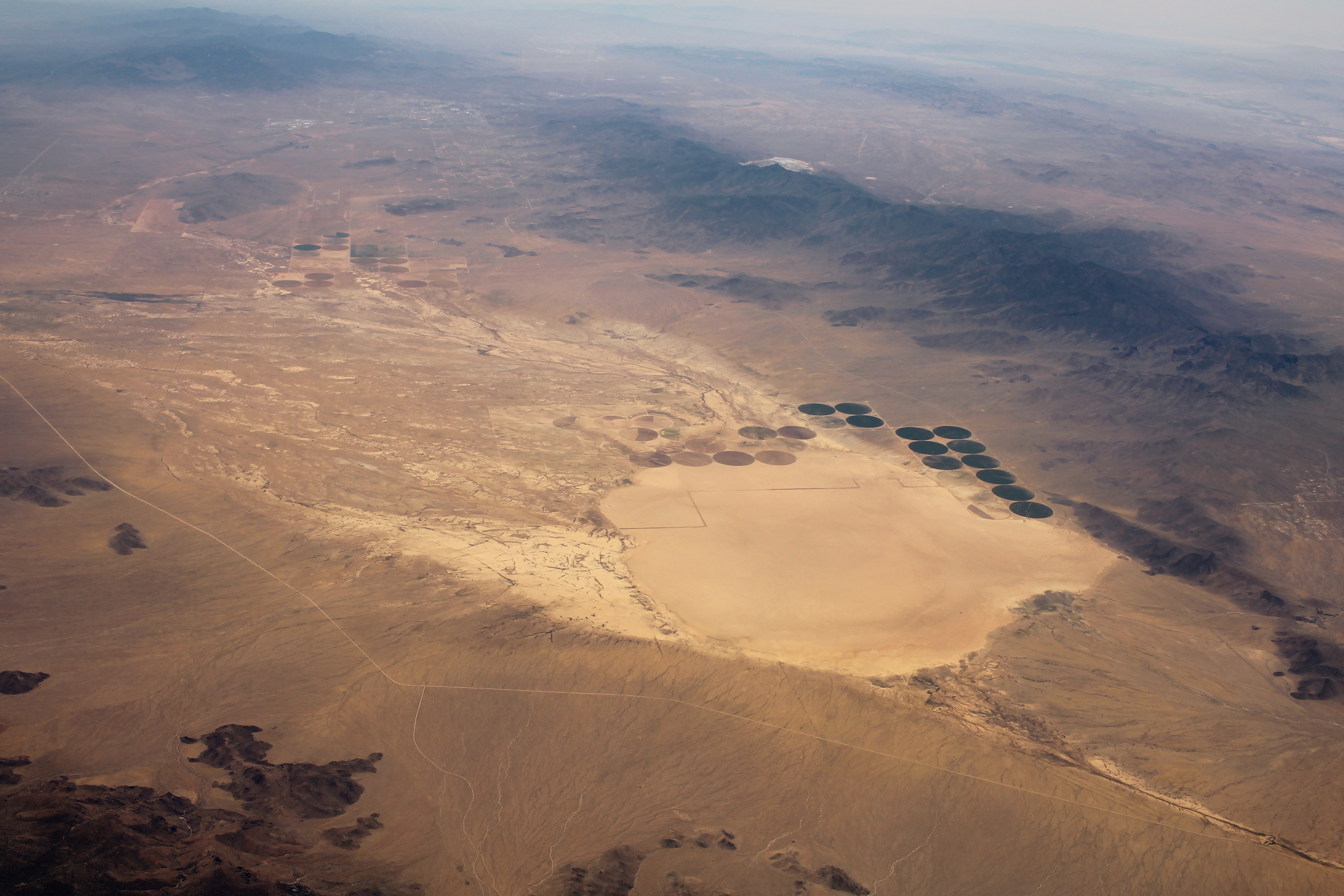
Aerial view of the Hualapai Valley

Hualapai Valley is a valley in Mohave County, Arizona.

== Location ==
Hualapai Valley is an endorheic basin and its watershed terminates in the dry lake or playa called Red Lake at an elevation of 2762 feet. It is bounded on the east by the Grand Wash Cliffs and Peacock Mountains, on the south by the Hualapai Mountains, on the west by the Cerbat Mountains and the White Hills. It extends from its divide with Gold Basin 35°46′57″N 114°07′53″W at over 2680 feet, southward to Red Lake, and northward from Kingman and the Hualapai Mountains 35°10′21″N 113°50′17″W at 4439 feet, to Red Lake.

=== Walapai ===
Walapai is a populated place on Arizona State Route 66 (former U.S. Route 66) in Mohave County, Arizona, United States. Walapai is located in the Hualapai Valley along a railroad line 14 miles (23 km) northeast of Kingman. Walapai has a post office with ZIP code 86412.

== History ==
From 1857 to 1858 Lieutenant Edward Fitzgerald Beale, built the first federal highway in the southwest, Beale's Wagon Road. Beale's road roughly followed the 35th Parallel railroad route laid out by Lieutenant Amiel Weeks Whipple west across New Mexico Territory through the Flagstaff area and then turned away northward through Peach Springs, Truxton Wash, and the Hualapai Valley, making its way through what became Kingman to a crossing on the Colorado River near the location of Fort Mohave.

J. L. Smith, was known as Hualapai Smith for being first to explore the Hualapai Valley of Arizona before any other prospector in the early 1860s.
