= Cerbat Mountains =

Landform in Mohave County, Arizona

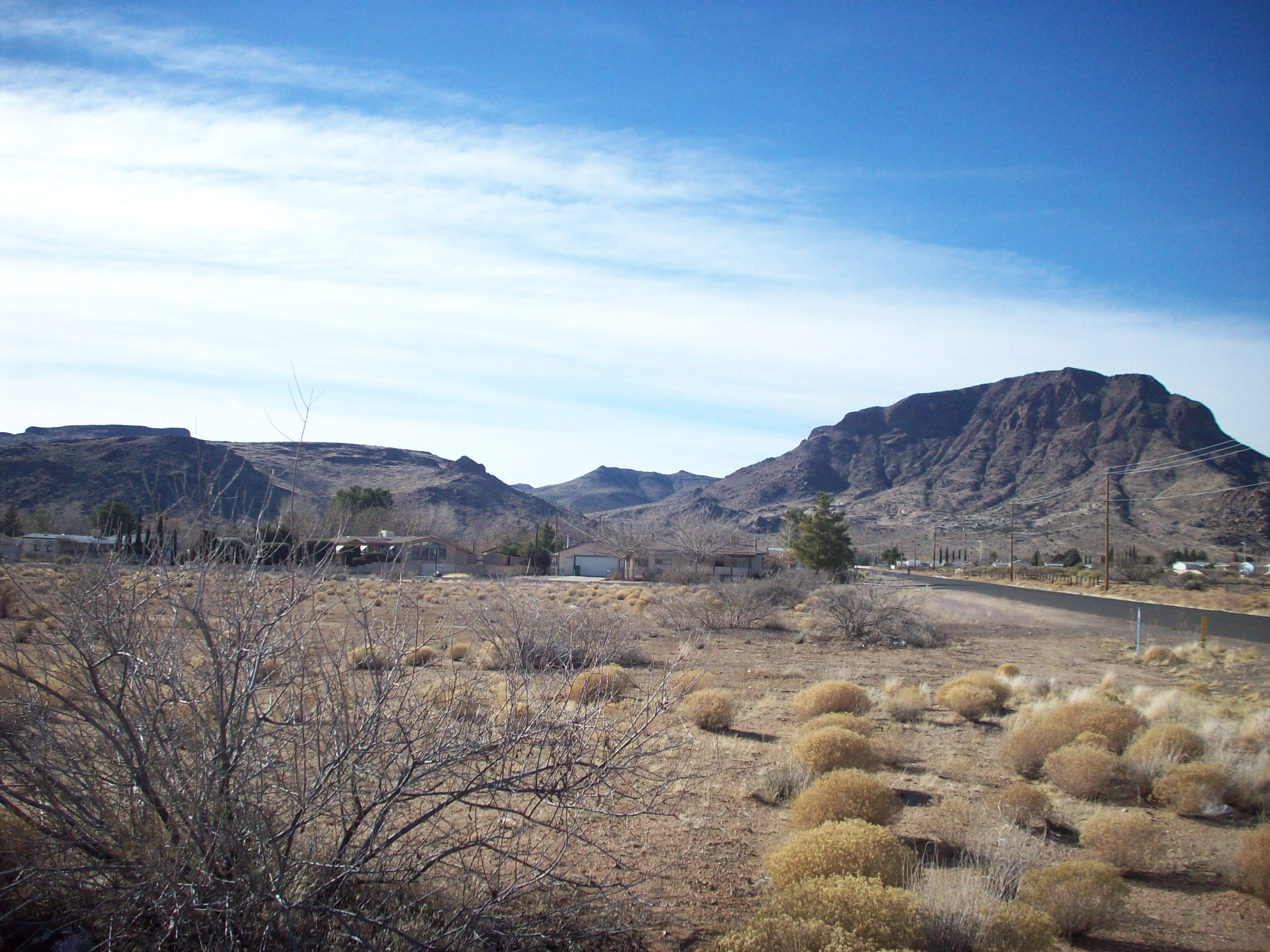
- Cerbat Mountains near Kingman

Highest point
- Peak: Mount Tipton
- Elevation: 7,138 ft (2,176 m)

Geography
- Country: United States
- State: Arizona
- Range coordinates: 35°25′52″N 114°10′04″W

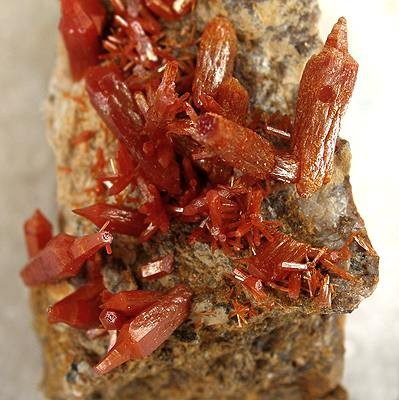
Vanadinite from the old Western Mine, in the southern Cerbat Mountains

The Cerbat Mountains (Walapai: Ha'emede) is a mountain range in Mohave County in northwest Arizona immediately north of Kingman. The Cerbat Mountains and the White Hills (Arizona) adjacent north, are the dividing ranges between the Detrital Valley west, and the Hualapai Valley east.

It is a 23 mi long range trending slightly northwest–southeast. It lies directly east of the 130-mile long Black Mountains range and is separated by the Sacramento Valley bordering southwest of Kingman through which Interstate 40 turns south and west to meet Needles, California; the long Detrital Valley and plains drains northwest of the mountains into southern Lake Mead.

A series of peaks can be found towards the southern end of the range, including Packsaddle Mountain at 6,431 feet (1,960 m), and Cherum Peak at 6,983 feet (2,128 m).

The northern section of the Cerbat Mountains is composed mostly of the Mount Tipton Wilderness, with Mount Tipton being its peak at 7,148 feet (2,179 m). The Dolan Springs community is at the base of the wilderness on the northwestern side of the Cerbat Mountains.

The Mineral Park mine, a large copper and turquoise mine, is located in the Cerbat Mountains 14 miles northwest of Kingman, Arizona.

== See also ==
- List of mountain ranges of Arizona
- List of LCRV Wilderness Areas (Colorado River)
