= Mineral Park mine =

Copper mine in Mohave County, Arizona

- Location within Arizona
- Location: Mohave County, Arizona, United States; 35°21′55″N 114°08′33″W
- Products: Copper and molybdenum
- Company: Origin Mining Company
- Acquired: 2015

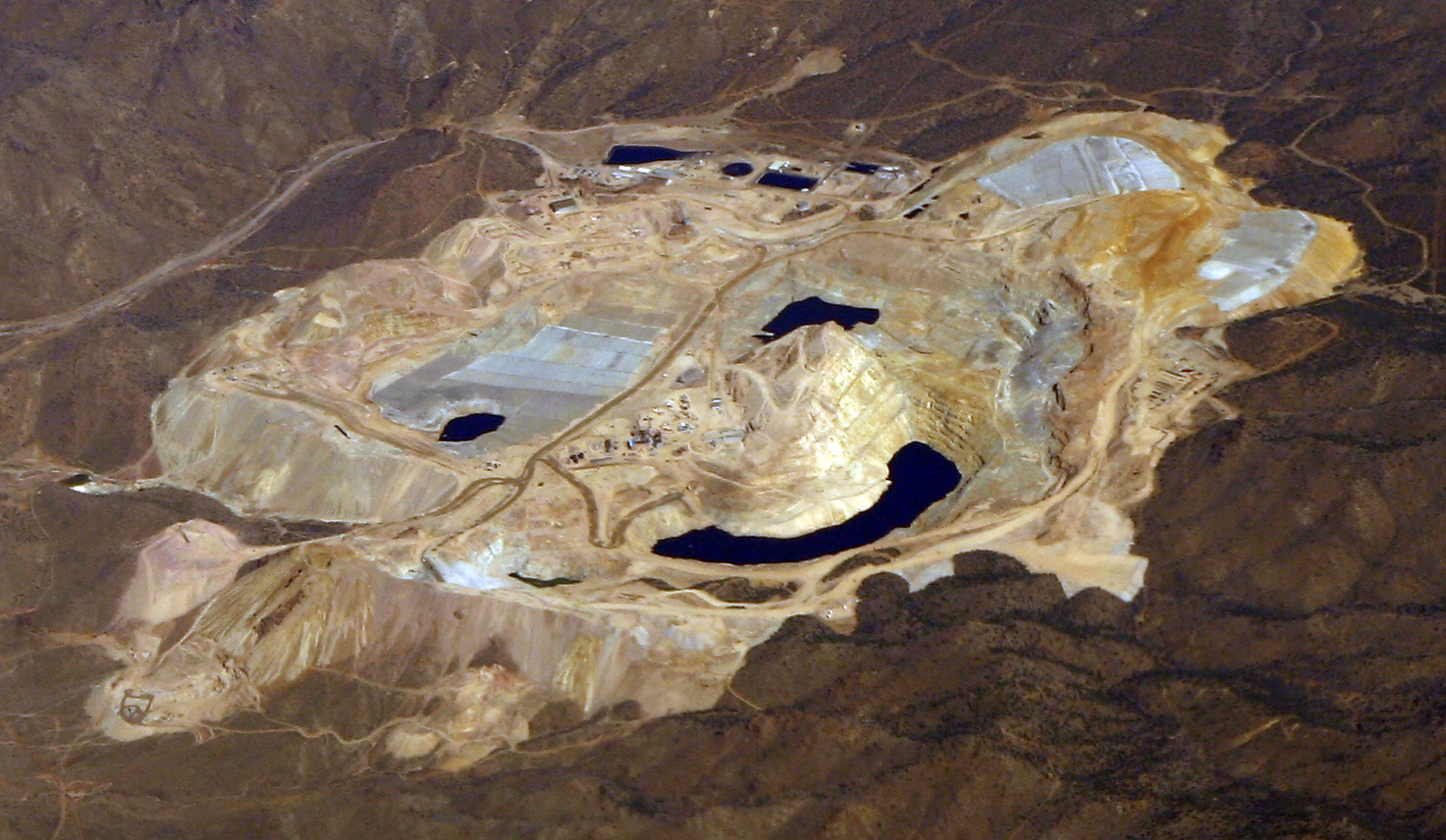
Mineral Park mine from the air, 2008

The Mineral Park mine is a large open-pit copper mine located in the Cerbat Mountains, 14 mi (23 km) northwest of Kingman, Arizona (in the southwestern United States). A 2013 report said that Mineral Park has an estimated reserves of 389 million t (383 million long tons; 429 million short tons) of ore grading 0.14% copper and 31 million oz (1.9 million lb; 880 t) of silver.

Large scale copper mining began in the old Mineral Park district in 1963 when Duval Corporation began the open pit operation. Cypress Mines (later Cyprus Amax Minerals acquired Duval's copper mines in 1986 and sold Mineral Park in 1997. The mine was acquired by Mercator Mineral Park Holdings of British Columbia in 2003. In December 2014 the mine closed as the company filed for bankruptcy. On January 20, 2015, it was reported that Origin Mining Company, a subsidiary of the Canadian company Waterton Global Resources who also own Elko Mining Group and Carlin Resources LLC in Nevada, had purchased the property.

In 2023 Origin began to refurbish and rebuild the mill that has sat dormant since it closed in 2014 using contractors from DRA Global and Mastec Corp to get the upgrades complete.

== Turquoise mining ==
Turquoise mined at this location is known as "Kingman Turquoise."

This mine was worked for turquoise by Native Americans before European contact. Archaeological evidence includes "Hohokam hammers, dating back to 600 a.d." and the Navajo hammers. "In the late 1880s to the early 1900s, Mineral Park was mined by the Aztec Turquoise Co., the Los Angeles Gem Co., Arizona Turquoise Co., Southwest Turquoise Co. and Mineral Park Turquoise Co." Since the 1970s, turquoise has been mined by members of the Colbaugh family.

== Mineral Park ==
Mineral Park, Arizona
- Ghost Town
- Interactive map of Mineral Park, Arizona
- Coordinates: 35°22′35.0″N 114°09′13.4″W
- State: Arizona
- County: Mohave
- Founded: 1871
- Elevation: 4,252 ft (1,296 m)
- Time zone: UTC-7 (MST (no DST))
- Post Office Opened: December 23, 1872
- Post Office Closed: June 15, 1912

Mineral Park was a mining town, now a ghost town in the Mineral Park valley of the Cerbat Mountains in Mohave County, Arizona. Its ruins and cemetery are now located within the property of the mine. Mining in the area began in 1871 and a camp was established soon after. The mines produced primarily silver, gold, copper, lead and zinc. The post office was opened December 23, 1872. It grew to be the largest town in the county and became the county seat in 1873. It had the county courthouse and jail, stores, hotels, saloons, shops, doctors, lawyers, assay offices and two stagecoach stations. The town published a newspaper, the Mohave County Miner.

In 1887 it lost the county seat to the railroad town of Kingman in an election. Some of the population and the newspaper moved and mining began to slacken with the price of silver. The post office closed on April 30, 1893. It reopened in September 1894, but closed for the last time in 1912. Mining revived in the area since the 1960s, but the town never did.

As of 2015, a cemetery, a few ruins and foundations remain within the property of the new mine.
