= Union Line (Colorado River) =

Former steamboat transport company

The Union Line was a transport company of steamboats of the Colorado River, owned by Thomas E. Trueworthy, operating in southeastern California, western Arizona Territory, and northwestern Mexico.

It was an opposition steamboat company to the George A. Johnson & Company on the Colorado River from 1864 to 1865. It was the first to use towed barges on the Colorado.

== Establishment of the Union Line ==
Merchants and miners held a protest meeting at La Paz, Arizona on December 1, 1863, fed up with shortages, delayed and slow deliveries of freight to their stores and mines, by Johnson & Company, who owned the Colorado River's only two steamboats. They condemned the Johnson Company as a monopoly, that was trying to drive the miners out in order to gain control of the mines. The meeting voted to send a representative to San Francisco with a petition calling for the establishment of an opposition steamboat line on the Colorado River.

In San Francisco, their representative Samuel "Steamboat" Adams convinced the Chamber of Commerce to endorse an opposition line. Merchants of the city raised $25,000 by subscription, and Adams persuaded Captain Thomas E. Trueworthy, to send the Sacramento River steamboat Esmerelda under Captain Charles C. Overman and the Victoria, a four-masted schooner converted from a barge, to the Colorado River to establish the Union Line there.

== Union Line on the Colorado River ==
The Victoria was to be a store ship at the mouth of the river, but she was soon broken up by the tidal bore soon after it reached the mouth of the river at the Colorado River Delta in March 1864.

After Overman arrived at the river in March 1864, he built the Black Crook, first tow barge to be used on the Colorado River. From May 1864, its success in delivering large amounts of cargo up river forced the Johnson Company to lower rates, build another steamboat and to add tow barges to his steamboats in 1864.

=== Union Line Consolidated ===
In the summer of 1865, with the steamboats Esmerelda of the Union Line and Nina Tilden of the Philadelphia Silver and Copper Mining Company (the other opposition line to the Johnson Company), was consolidated into the Pacific and Colorado Steam Navigation Company, also headed by Thomas E. Trueworthy, with backing from San Francisco financiers.

== See also ==
- Steamboat transport on the Colorado River
