= Philadelphia Silver and Copper Mining Company =

19th-century American mining corporation

Philadelphia Silver and Copper Mining Company was a 19th-century mining corporation chartered in Pennsylvania, April 8, 1864.

== Background ==
The company owned mining properties along the Colorado River in the Lower Colorado River Valley, in California and Arizona Territory in the 1860s. The company involved eastern financiers including Thomas Tilden, Adolph Hugel, John Potter, William Reich, Alphonso F. Tilden, and Robert Smith.

Its managing director was Alphonso F. Tilden, based in San Francisco.

The company mining properties were silver mines in El Dorado Canyon in the Colorado Mining District of what was then Arizona Territory and after 1869 Lincoln County, Nevada; and copper mine in the Freeman Mining District in San Bernardino County, California across the river from Aubrey Landing.

== See also ==
- Colorado Mining District (New Mexico Territory)
- Steamboat transport on the Colorado River
