= Arizona's 9th congressional district =

U.S. House district for Arizona

Coordinates: 33°25′N 111°55′W

- Interactive map of district boundaries since January 3, 2023
- Representative: Paul Gosar; R–Bullhead City
- Population (2025): 953,808
- Median household income: $81,736
- Ethnicity: 57.5% White; 29.9% Hispanic; 4.2% Black; 4.2% Two or more races; 2.3% Asian; 1.3% Native American; 0.6% other
- Cook PVI: R+15

Arizona's 9th congressional district was created as a result of the 2010 census. The first candidates ran in the 2012 House elections, and the first representative was seated for the 113th Congress in 2013. Formerly located in the Phoenix area, the 9th district has been in western Arizona since 2023.

Paul Gosar, who previously represented the 1st and 4th districts, was elected to the seat in 2022 following redistricting. He was sworn in on January 3, 2023. With a Cook Partisan Voting Index rating of R+15, it is the most Republican district in Arizona.

== History ==
Because it was created in the 2010 redistricting cycle, the first iteration of the 9th district was in effect for election cycles from 2012 to 2020. This version of the district was entirely within Maricopa County. The district included parts of the 2003–2013 versions of the 3rd, 4th, 5th, and 6th districts. Over 60% of the district's population came from the previous 5th district. During this period, the 9th district included liberal bastions such as Tempe, strongly conservative portions of the East Valley, and more moderate Republican voters in eastern and southern Phoenix.

Following the 2020 redistricting cycle, this district essentially became the 4th district, while the 9th was redrawn to cover most of the old 4th district. The 9th district's updated boundaries include all of La Paz County, most of Mohave County, most of Yuma County, and the western part of Maricopa County. It covers the majority of Arizona's western border, and like its predecessor is heavily Republican, being the most Republican district in Arizona and the fifth-most-Republican district in the West. The 4th's incumbent, Paul Gosar, transferred to the 9th and was re-elected unopposed.

== Composition ==
For the 118th and successive Congresses (based on redistricting following the 2020 census), the district contains all or portions of the following counties and communities.

La Paz County (17)
All 17 communities

Maricopa County (16)
Aguila, Arlington, Buckeye, Circle City, Citrus Park, El Mirage, Glendale (part; also 8th), Goodyear (part; also 7th), Litchfield Park, Morristown, Surprise (part; also 8th), Tonopah, Wickenburg, Wintersburg, Wittmann, Youngtown

Mohave County (42)
Antares, Arizona Village, Beaver Dam, Bullhead City, Cane Beds, Centennial Park, Chloride, Clacks Canyon, Colorado City, Crozier, Crystal Beach, Desert Hills, Dolan Springs, Fort Mohave, Golden Shores, Golden Valley, Hackberry, Katherine, Kingman, Lake Havasu City, Lazy Y U, Littlefield, McConnico, Meadview, Mesquite Creek, Mojave Ranch Estates, Mohave Valley, New Kingman-Butler, Oatman, Pine Lake, Pinion Pines, Scenic, So-Hi, Topock, Truxton, Valentine, Valley Vista, Walnut Creek, White Hills, Wikieup, Willow Valley, Yucca

Yuma County (11)
Aztec, Dateland, Buckshot, El Prado Estates, Fortuna Foothills, Martinez Lake, Padre Ranchitos, Tacna, Wellton (part; also 7th), Yuma (part; also 7th), Yuma Proving Ground

== Recent election results from statewide races ==
Year	Office	Results
2013–2023 Boundaries
2008	President	Obama 51.3% - 47.4%
2010	Senate	McCain 55.5% - 37.7%
2010	Governor	Goddard 49.8% - 46.3%
2012	President	Obama 51.1% - 46.6%
2012	Senate	Carmona 51.8% - 43.4%
2014	Governor	DuVal 49.1% - 46.3%
2016	President	Clinton 54.7% - 38.4%
2016	Senate	McCain 47.8% - 46.7%
2018	Senate	Sinema 61.3% - 36.4%
2018	Governor	Garcia 52.3% - 45.6%
2018	Attorney General	Contreras 57.7% - 42.1%
2020	President	Biden 60.8% - 37.3%
2020	Senate (Spec.)	Kelly 62.2% - 37.8%
2023–2033 Boundaries
2016	President	Trump 61.4% - 32.3%
2016	Senate	McCain 60.9% - 31.0%
2018	Senate	McSally 59.4% - 37.7%
2018	Governor	Ducey 67.9% - 30.0%
2018	Attorney General	Brnovich 63.9% - 36.0%
2020	President	Trump 62.2% - 36.4%
2020	Senate (Spec.)	McSally 61.1% - 38.9%
2022	Senate	Masters 60.0% - 37.6%
2022	Governor	Lake 63.4% - 36.3%
2022	Secretary of State	Finchem 61.6% - 38.3%
2022	Attorney General	Hamadeh 64.0% - 35.9%
2022	Treasurer	Yee 68.3% - 31.7%
2024	President	Trump 65.1% - 34.0%
2024	Senate	Lake 60.1% - 37.5%

== List of members representing the district ==
Arizona began sending a ninth member to the House after the 2010 census, the 2012 congressional election, and the convening of the 113th Congress.

Representative (Residence)	Party	Years	Cong ress	Electoral history	District location
District created January 3, 2013
Kyrsten Sinema (Phoenix)	Democratic	January 3, 2013 – January 3, 2019	113th 114th 115th	Elected in 2012. Re-elected in 2014. Re-elected in 2016. Retired to run for U.S. senator.	2013–2023: Part of Maricopa County
Greg Stanton (Phoenix)	Democratic	January 3, 2019 – January 3, 2023	116th 117th	Elected in 2018. Re-elected in 2020. Redistricted to the 4th district.	2013–2023: Part of Maricopa County
Paul Gosar (Bullhead City)	Republican	January 3, 2023 – present	118th 119th 120th	Redistricted from the 4th district and re-elected in 2022. Re-elected in 2024. Re-elected in 2026.	2023–present: Parts of La Paz, Mohave, Yuma, and Maricopa counties

== Complete election results ==
Graph of election results in Arizona's 9th congressional district and its predecessors (Since 2012) View source data.

=== 2012–2022 ===
==== 2012 ====
Arizona's 9th congressional district election, 2012
Party	Candidate	Votes	%
Democratic	Kyrsten Sinema	121,881	48.7
Republican	Vernon Parker	111,630	44.6
Libertarian	Powell Gammill	16,620	6.6
Write-in		363	0.1
Majority		10,251	4.1
Total votes		250,494	100.0
Democratic win (new boundaries)			

==== 2014 ====
Arizona's 9th congressional district election, 2014
Party	Candidate	Votes	%	±%
Democratic	Kyrsten Sinema (incumbent)	88,609	54.7	+6.0
Republican	Wendy Rogers	67,841	41.9	–2.7
Libertarian	Powell Gammill	5,612	3.5	–3.2
Majority		20,768	12.8	+8.7
Total votes		162,062	100.0	
Democratic hold		Swing	+4.4	

==== 2016 ====
Arizona's 9th congressional district election, 2016
Party	Candidate	Votes	%	±%
Democratic	Kyrsten Sinema (incumbent)	169,055	60.9	+6.2
Republican	Dave Giles	108,350	39.1	–2.8
Green	Cary Dolego (write-in)	60	0.0	N/a
Independent	Axel Bello (write-in)	46	0.0	N/a
Majority		60,705	21.9	+9.1
Total votes		277,507	100.0	
Democratic hold		Swing	+4.5	

==== 2018 ====
Arizona's 9th congressional district election, 2018
Party	Candidate	Votes	%	±%
Democratic	Greg Stanton	146,659	60.9	–0.0
Republican	Steve Ferrara	94,264	39.1	+0.1
Majority		52,395	21.7	–0.1
Total votes		240,923	100.0	
Democratic hold		Swing	–0.0	

==== 2020 ====
Arizona's 9th congressional district election, 2020
Party	Candidate	Votes	%	±%
Democratic	Greg Stanton (incumbent)	217,094	61.6	+0.8
Republican	Dave Giles	135,180	38.4	–0.8
Majority		81,914	23.3	+1.5
Total votes		352,274	100.0	
Democratic hold		Swing	+0.8	

=== 2022–present ===
==== 2022 ====
Arizona's 9th congressional district election, 2022
Party	Candidate	Votes	%
Republican	Paul Gosar (incumbent)	192,796	97.8
Democratic	write ins	4,389	2.2
Majority		188,407	95.5
Total votes		197,185	100.0
Republican win (new boundaries)			

==== 2024 ====
Arizona's 9th congressional district election, 2024
Party	Candidate	Votes	%	±%
Republican	Paul Gosar (incumbent)	249,583	65.3	–32.5
Democratic	Quacy Smith	132,640	34.7	+32.5
Majority		116,943	30.6	–65.0
Total votes		382,223	100.0	
Republican hold		Swing	▼32.5	
