= County Route 10 (Mohave County, Arizona) =

Highway in Mohave County, Arizona, United States

County Road 10
- Oatman Highway; Oatman–Topock Highway
- CR 10 highlighted in red

Route information
- Maintained by Mohave County Public Works
- Length: 50.1 mi (80.6 km)
- Existed: 1955–present
- History: Previously known as the National Old Trails Road (1914–1927) and US 66 (1926–1952)
- Tourist routes: Historic Route 66

Major junctions
- West end: I-40 / Historic US 66 in Topock
- CR 1 in Golden Shores; CR 153 near Boundary Cone; CR 155 southwest of Goldroad; Historic US 66 near Walnut Creek
- East end: Old Cooks Road in McConnico

Location
- Country: United States
- State: Arizona
- County: Mohave

Highway system
- Mohave County Roads

County Route 10 (CR 10), locally known as the Oatman Highway or the Oatman–Topock Highway, is a 50.1-mile-long (80.6 km) northeast–southwest highway in Mohave County, Arizona, United States. The highway is primarily used to serve the cities of Oatman and Topock. The road is almost entirely concurrent with Historic Route 66. The 8-mile-long (13 km) stretch through the Black Mountains, also known as "The Sidewinder", has 191 curves, turns, and switchbacks.

== Route description ==
CR 10 begins at Interstate 40 (I-40) near the Old Trails Bridge, which is the bridge that carried the National Old Trails Road over the Colorado River between Topock, Arizona and Parker Junction, California. 2,185 feet (666 m) west of I-40, it then crosses under BNSF Railway (formerly the Atchison, Topeka and Santa Fe Railway). CR 10 then passes through Catfish Paradise, an area located within the Havasu National Wildlife Refuge. In Golden Shores, CR 10 has an intersection with CR 1 (Powell Lake Road). CR 10 then passes through Golden Shores after CR 1.

Approximately 11.9 miles (19.2 km) north of Golden Shores, CR 10 arrives at the foothills of the Black Mountains, following the base of those mountains for six miles (9.7 km) before entering them. Shortly afterward, the highway arrives in the town of Oatman, passing through the center of the old mining town. North of Oatman, CR 10 turns in a generally eastward direction winding its way up and through the Black Mountains over treacherous curves. CR 10 passes through the small mining community of Goldroad and the adjacent mine, before continuing on its winding path up the mountainsides.

Less than two miles (3.2 km) east of the Goldroad Mine, CR 10 crosses over Sitgreaves Pass at an elevation of 3,550 feet (1,080 m), making its slow winding descent towards the other side of the Black Mountains. The highway finally exited the mountains at Cold Springs Station, heading straight east before curving northeast again, away from the mountains. As it heads northeast, Historic Route 66 turns right onto Shinarump Drive, ending its concurrency with CR 10. After Shinarump Drive, CR 10 makes a big curve and then travels closely parallel to I-40. Several thousand feet after the big curve, CR 10 meets its eastern terminus at a northeast-southeast L-shaped turn with Old Cooks Road in McConnico.

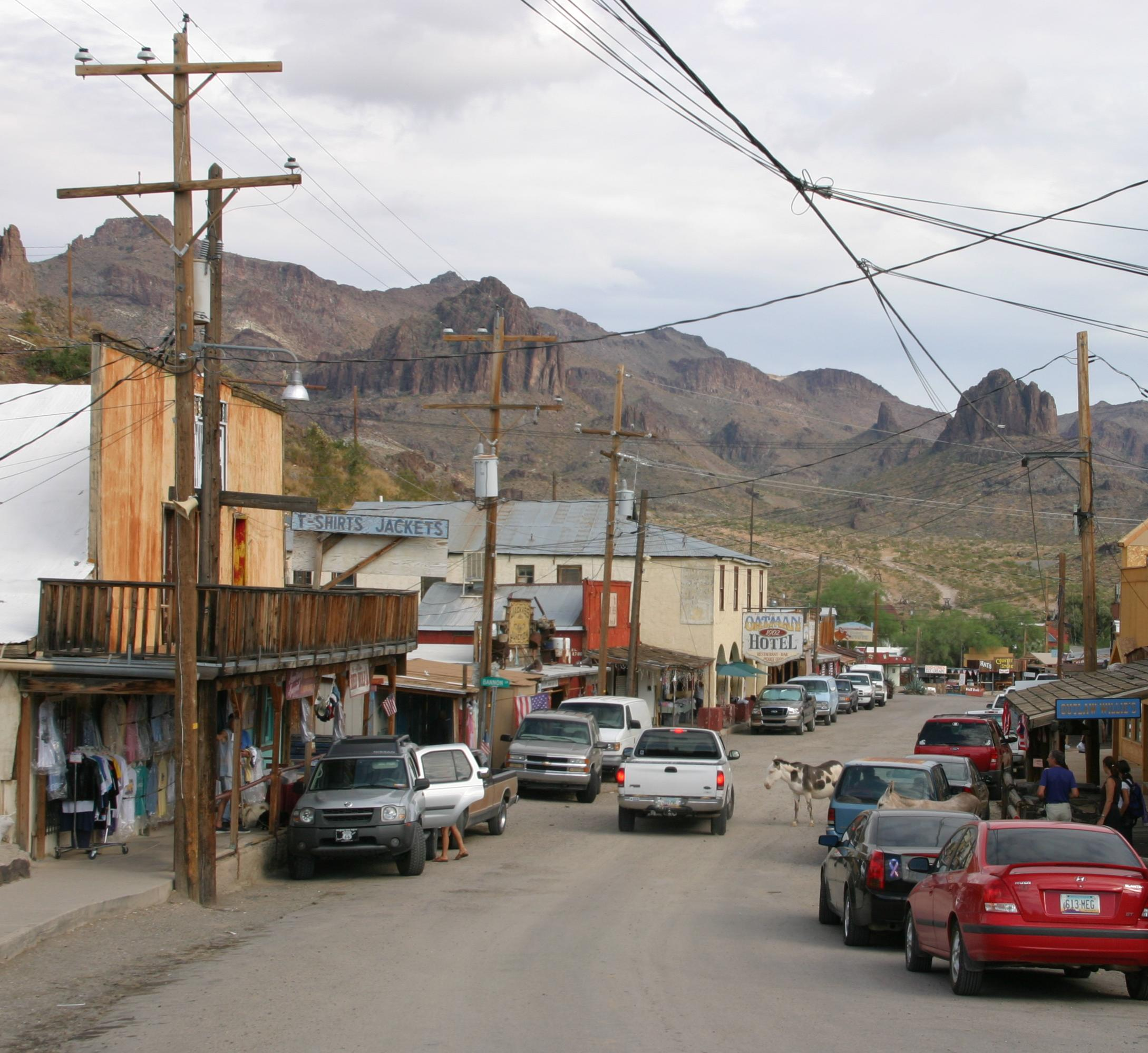
CR 10 through downtown Oatman

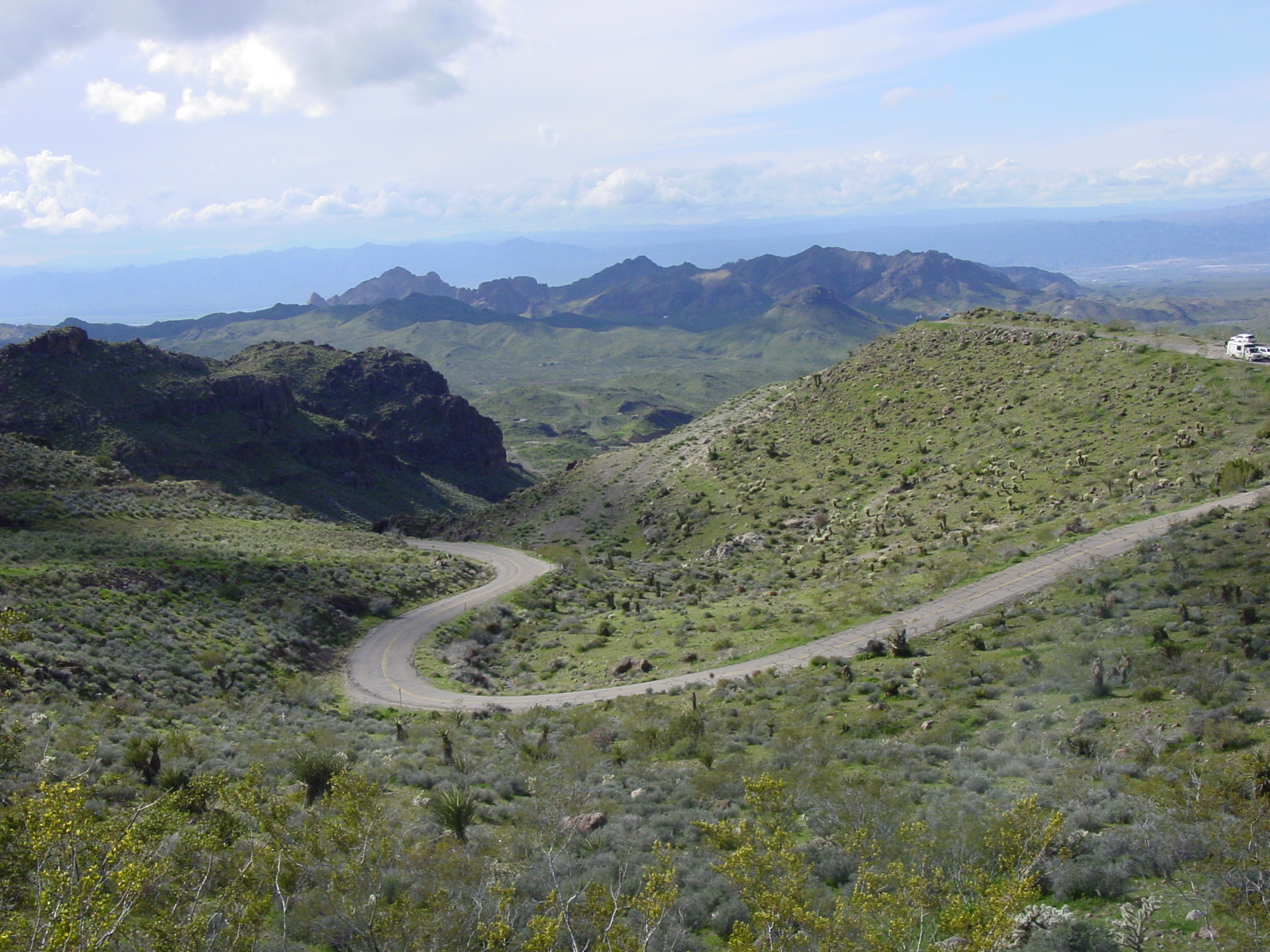
CR 10 over Sitgreaves Pass, east of Oatman

== History ==
In 1950, the State Highway Department began planning construction of a new alignment of US 66 through Yucca. Construction was planned to start near Topock and head northeast through Yucca to connect with the existing highway near Kingman. At the time, the section between Topock and Kingman still followed the steep and winding path through Oatman into the Black Mountains and through Sitgreaves Pass. This section was built across this rough terrain instead of following the more level route to the east adopted by the railroad because the road followed the National Old Trails highway which was for gold mining in Oatman and Goldroad (now a ghost town). It was fraught with hairpin turns and was the steepest along the entire route, so much so that some early travelers, too frightened at the prospect of driving such a potentially dangerous road, hired locals to navigate the winding grade. By September 1950, the Oatman bypass was given priority on the state highway construction agenda, as US 66 was crucial to military defense traffic. The State Highway Department contracted the Phoenix-Tempe Stone Company to construct the first six miles (9.7 km) of the new route on September 15, 1950, at a cost of $262,152 (equivalent to $2.63 million in 2023).

By early 1951, the bypass was under construction. Phoenix-Tempe was awarded a second contract on February 1, 1951, to build an overpass over the Santa Fe Railway in Yucca along with the approach roads to the overpass. In April 1951, a contract to construct 10 miles (16 km) of the new bypass was given to the W.J. Henson company for $234,872 (equivalent to $2.21 million in 2023). The Highway Department created another contract job in October 1951 to pave and construct a further 18 miles (29 km) of the bypass route, in hopes of speeding up the project. The Phoenix-Tempe company was again awarded the contract. Despite the highway's priority and rushed construction, the Yucca Overpass was delayed for several months due to a shortage of available steel. The steel was finally delivered to begin the overpass construction on January 25, 1951.

Construction of the bypass continued through late 1951 to the middle of 1952. By August 1952, construction on the bypass was winding down. By this point, 28 miles (45 km) had been completed with the final 17 miles (27 km) under construction. The bypass was completed and opened to traffic on September 17, 1952. The overall construction of the bypass from 1950 to 1952 was done at record speed at the time, being the fastest major highway construction project within the state's history. US 66 was rerouted onto the new bypass, removing Oatman from US 66. The new route ran along level ground close to the railroad, from Topock to Kingman through Yucca. The bypassing of Oatman lead to the town's decline and near abandonment, while Yucca enjoyed a small period of increased success from US 66 traffic. Oatman Highway remained an undesignated state highway until September 2, 1955, when it was completely transferred to Mohave County.

== Major intersections ==
Location	mi	km	Destinations	Notes
Topock	0.0	0.0	I-40 – Old Trails Bridge, Flagstaff, Los Angeles	Western terminus of CR 10; western end of Historic US 66 concurrency; I-40 exit 1
Golden Shores	5.1	8.2	CR 1 west / Powell Lake Road – Golden Shores, South Point Calpine, Arizona Village	Eastern terminus of CR 1
	22.6	36.4	CR 153 west (Boundary Cone Road / Oatman Road) – Mesquite Creek	Eastern terminus of CR 153
	26.1	42.0	CR 155 west (Silver Creek Road) – Bullhead City	Eastern terminus of CR 155
	47.8	76.9	Historic US 66 east / Shinarump Drive / Prescription Road – Kingman	Eastern end of Historic US 66 concurrency
McConnico	50.1	80.6	Old Cooks Road north	Eastern terminus of CR 10
1.000 mi = 1.609 km; 1.000 km = 0.621 mi: Concurrency terminus

== See also ==
- Interstate 40 Business (Kingman, Arizona)
- Arizona State Route 66
