= Antares, Arizona =

- Census-designated place
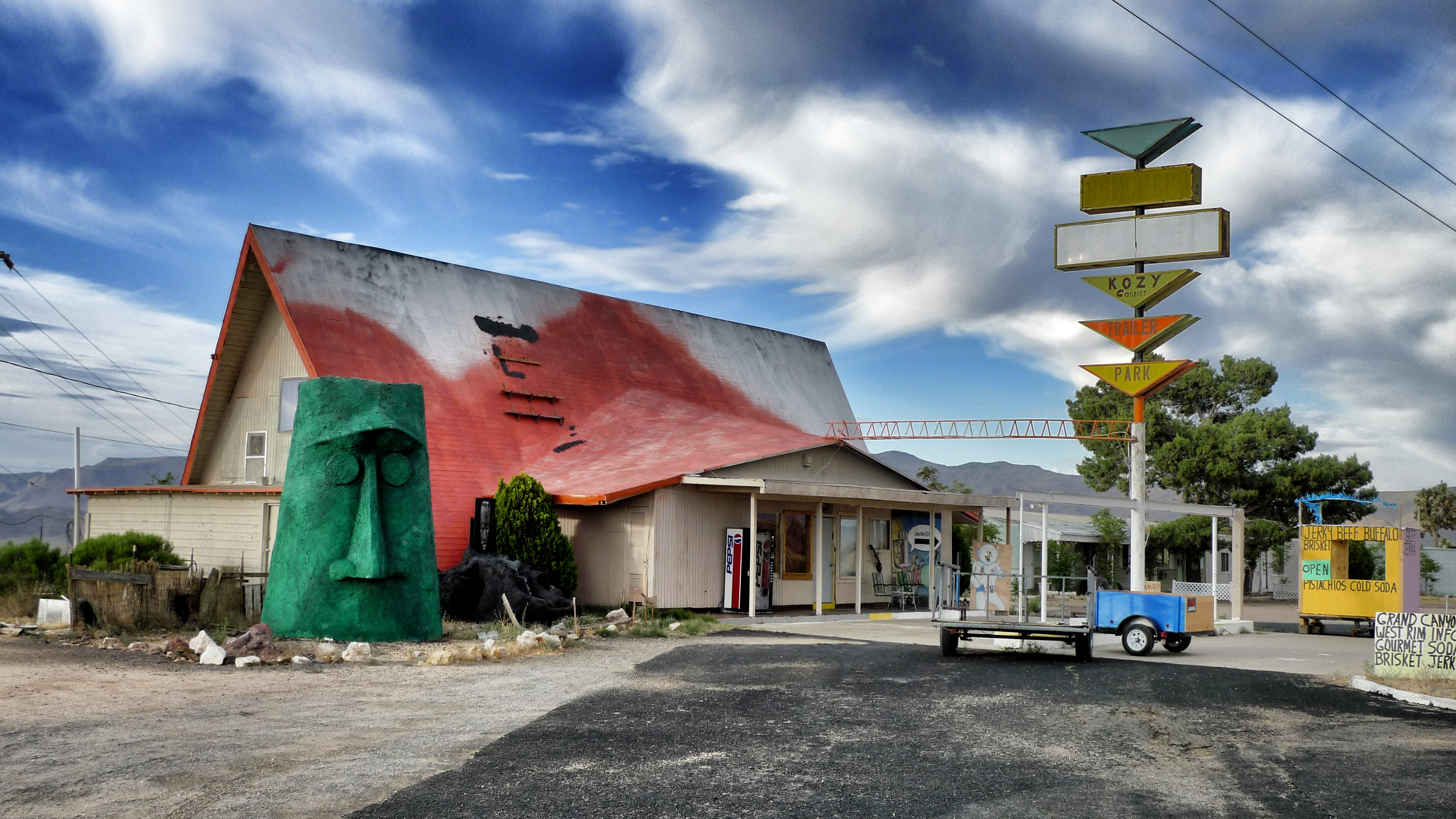
- Tourist attractions in 2011

- Location in Arizona

- Location within Arizona Location within the United States
- Coordinates: 35°25′23″N 113°48′30″W
- Country: United States
- State: Arizona
- County: Mohave

Area
  - Total: 0.65 sq mi (1.7 km^{2})
  - Land: 0.65 sq mi (1.7 km^{2})
  - Water: 0 sq mi (0 km^{2})
- Elevation: 3,498 ft (1,066 m)

Population (2020)
  - Total: 132
  - Density: 200/sq mi (78/km^{2})
- Time zone: UTC−07:00 (Mountain Standard Time)
- ZIP code: 86401
- Area code: 928
- GNIS feature ID: 2582728

Antares is an unincorporated community and census-designated place (CDP) in Mohave County, Arizona, United States. As of the 2020 census, it had a population of 132. It exists along part of historic U.S. Route 66.

== Etymology ==
Antares is named after the red supergiant star Antares, in the constellation of Scorpio; the word is Greek and means "rival of Mars", given to the star because of its prominent red color.

== History ==
The village of Antares began as a railroad siding. The Atlantic and Pacific Railroad was laying tracks through the area in 1883 and had to reroute around the Peacock Mountains, diverting south of the mountains to the easier gradient through nearby Hackberry; when continuing west, the gradient was lower in the Hualapai Valley 6 miles (10 km) to the north of Hackberry, where Antares now lies. The railroad thus took a large curve to travel through this point down into Kingman. The siding built on the curve became incorporated as Antares after the National Old Trails Highway was constructed in 1910, following the railroad in this part of Arizona; when Route 66 was built in 1926 it also ran parallel to the railroad. Antares was first recorded as a "town and railroad station" in the United States Geological Survey of 1923.

There are over 6,000 mining claims in and around Antares, of which 5,566 are closed. There are 213 identifiable mines in the area, which primarily dug for copper, gold, lead, and silver.

== Geography ==
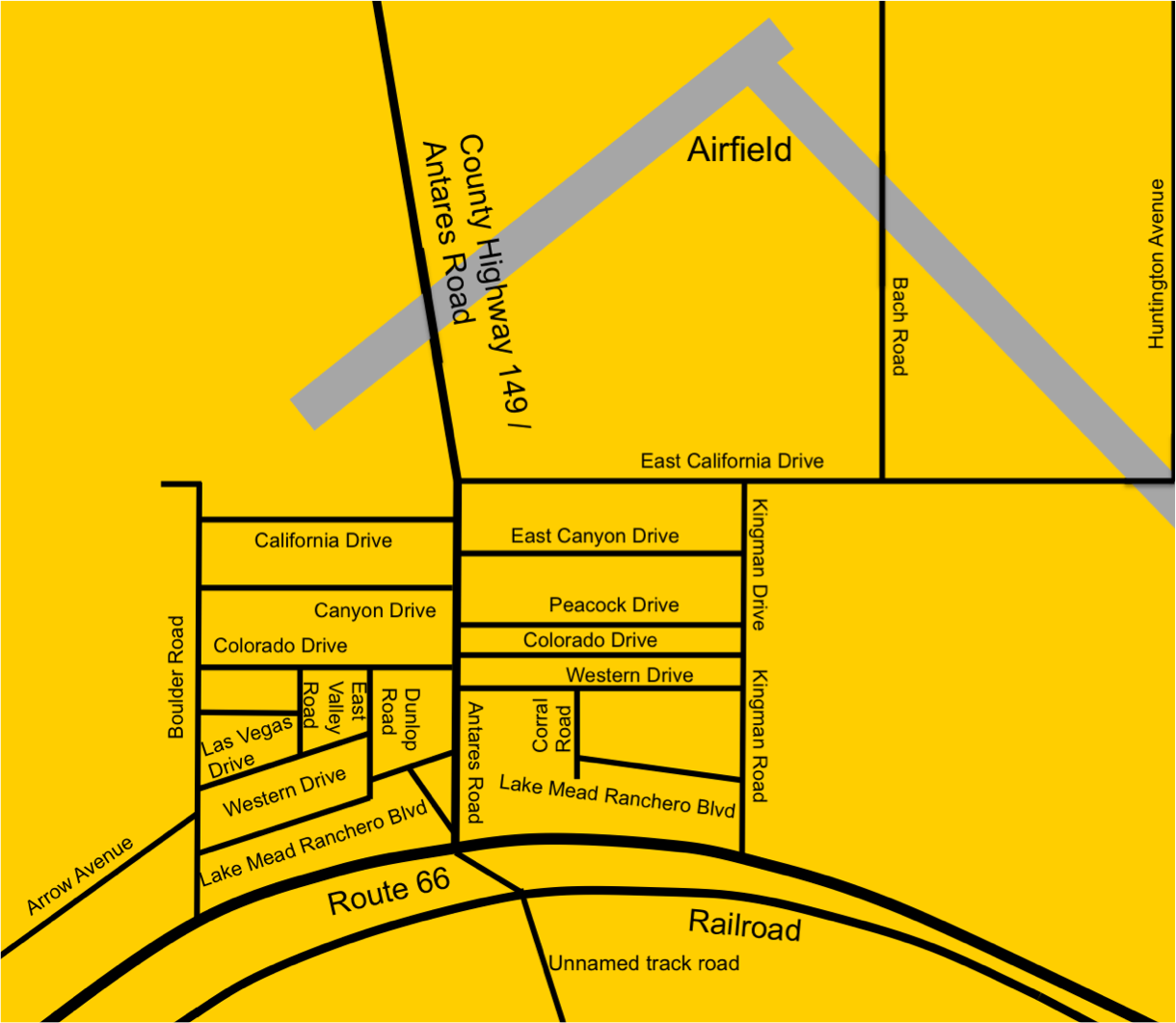
The road layout in and around Antares

Antares is located in northwestern Arizona, in central Mohave County, 21 miles (34 km) northeast of Kingman, the county seat. The Antares census-designated place encompasses 0.65 square miles (1.7 km^{2}) of land, and is at 3,556 feet (1,084 m) elevation above sea level. The southern edge of the CDP follows State Route 66 (former U.S. 66) and so curves, peaking near the center of the village. The eastern border is a roughly south–north road that is called Kingman Road south of Colorado Drive, and Kingman Drive north of this intersection. The western border runs parallel and is called Boulder Road. The village is bisected by Antares Road, which forms part of the northern border where California Drive, the west–east road at the village limit, staggers: the California Drive section from Boulder Road to Antares Road is slightly further south than East California Drive, which continues due east of the village until it reaches North Music Mountain Road. Only the eastern border road and California Drive west of Antares Road are entirely contained within Antares village limits. There are several other roads in the village, all named for nearby features and locations. The Valle Vista planned community is 4 miles (6 km) west of Antares.

Most of the buildings in Antares lie to the west of Antares Road, though there are some in the southeast corner, some in the tourist spots in the center-south on Route 66, and a few buildings on the extension of Boulder Road that lies to the northwest of the village limits. Mailboxes for the residents all lie at the Route 66–Antares Road intersection.

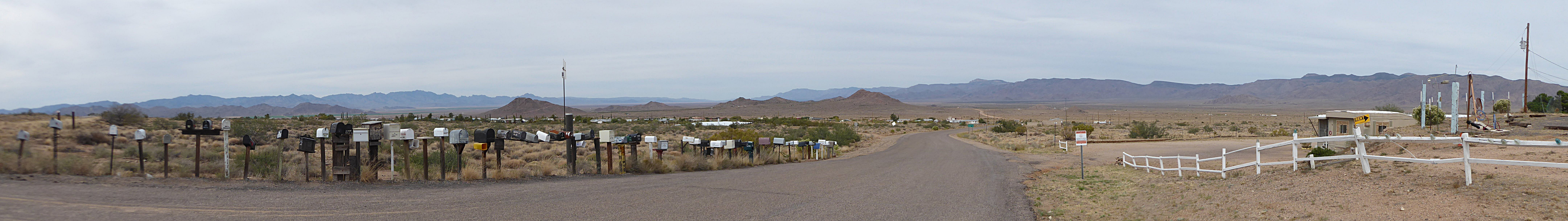
Panoramic view of Antares in 2016

== Demographics ==
Historical population
Census	Pop.	Note	%±
2010	126		—
2020	132		4.8%
U.S. Decennial Census

Antares first appeared on the 2010 U.S. Census as a census-designated place (CDP). Of the 126 Antares residents as of 2010, 64 (50.8%) were male and 62 (49.2%) were female. The median age of its citizens was of 64.1 years at that time. The majority of the population is White American, with a small number of Native Americans and no others. The town's population density rated at 194.81 per square mile, ranking the town as #217 in population density. The city experienced a 17.6% decrease in population from 2006 to 2010.

== Climate ==
Climate data for Truxton Canyon (Antares CDP), Arizona
Month	Jan	Feb	Mar	Apr	May	Jun	Jul	Aug	Sep	Oct	Nov	Dec	Year
Mean daily maximum °F (°C)	53.5 (11.9)	58.5 (14.7)	64.2 (17.9)	72.0 (22.2)	81.1 (27.3)	91.7 (33.2)	96.4 (35.8)	93.9 (34.4)	87.8 (31.0)	77.7 (25.4)	65.4 (18.6)	55.5 (13.1)	74.8 (23.8)
Mean daily minimum °F (°C)	27.4 (−2.6)	30.3 (−0.9)	33.8 (1.0)	39.5 (4.2)	46.9 (8.3)	55.3 (12.9)	64.0 (17.8)	62.3 (16.8)	55.5 (13.1)	44.7 (7.1)	34.2 (1.2)	28.1 (−2.2)	43.5 (6.4)
Average precipitation inches (mm)	1.05 (27)	1.07 (27)	0.97 (25)	0.69 (18)	0.29 (7.4)	0.21 (5.3)	1.27 (32)	1.97 (50)	1.13 (29)	0.70 (18)	0.56 (14)	1.00 (25)	10.91 (277.7)
Average snowfall inches (cm)	1.1 (2.8)	0.6 (1.5)	0.5 (1.3)	0.1 (0.25)	0.0 (0.0)	0.0 (0.0)	0.0 (0.0)	0.0 (0.0)	0.0 (0.0)	0.0 (0.0)	0.2 (0.51)	1.7 (4.3)	4.2 (10.66)
Source: WRCC

== Transportation ==
=== Road and rail ===
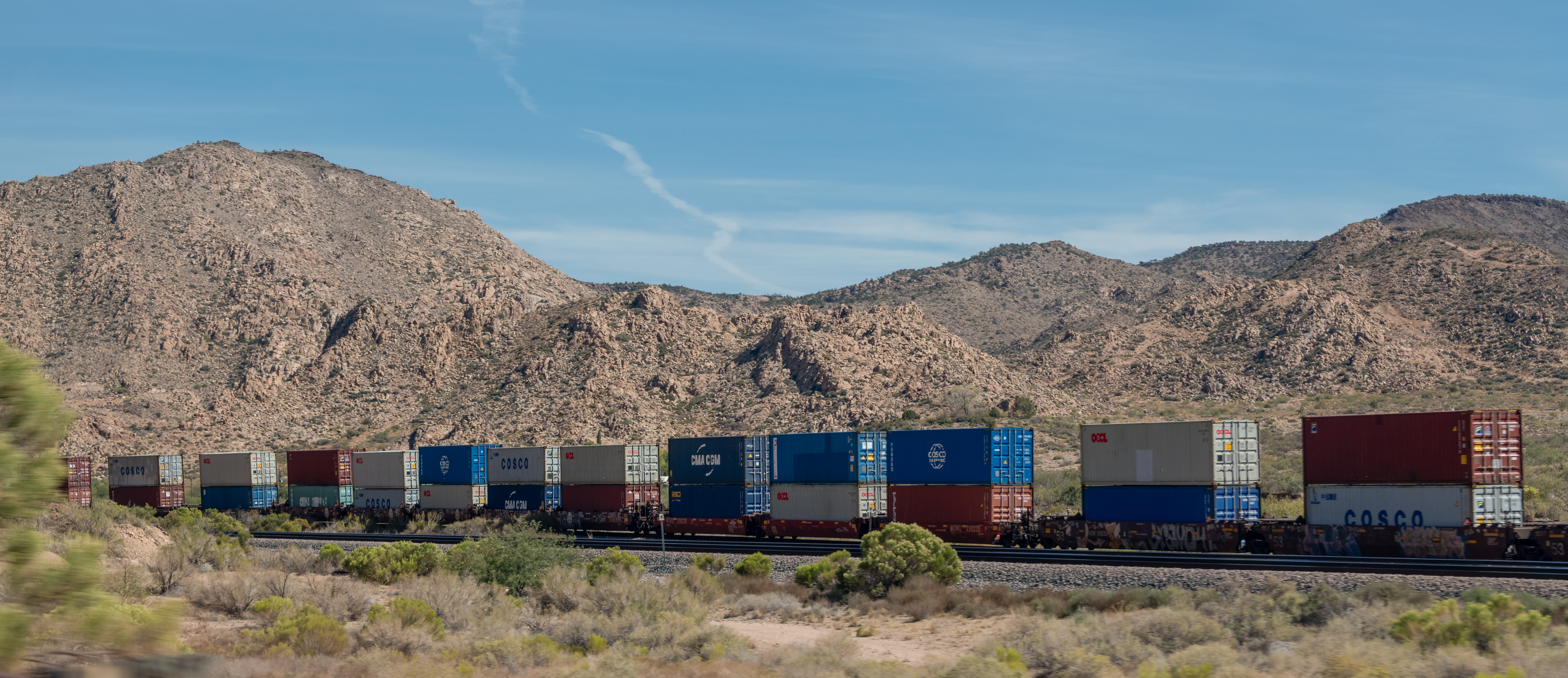
A passing freight train in 2019

Antares is along Route 66, which is the main road of the village. The BNSF Railway runs parallel to Route 66.

An unpaved side road called Antares Road and described as "fine for all vehicles" also runs north through the Hualapai Valley. Antares Road is a county road. It runs from Route 66 heading roughly northwest until it meets Pierce Ferry Road, giving access to Meadview and the Colorado River at Lake Mead. The U.S. Geological Survey says that "Antares Road is unpaved for 31 of the 32 miles; however, Mohave County does maintain the road to a native material standard." Antares Road is designated County Highway 149, and after the intersection at Pierce Ferry Road it continues as County Highway 139/Gregg's Hideout Road.

The part of Route 66 that runs through the village is a long curve. This curve, known as "Antares Point", is the longest continuous curve on any United States Highway, running for about 2 mi (3.2 km).

=== Air ===
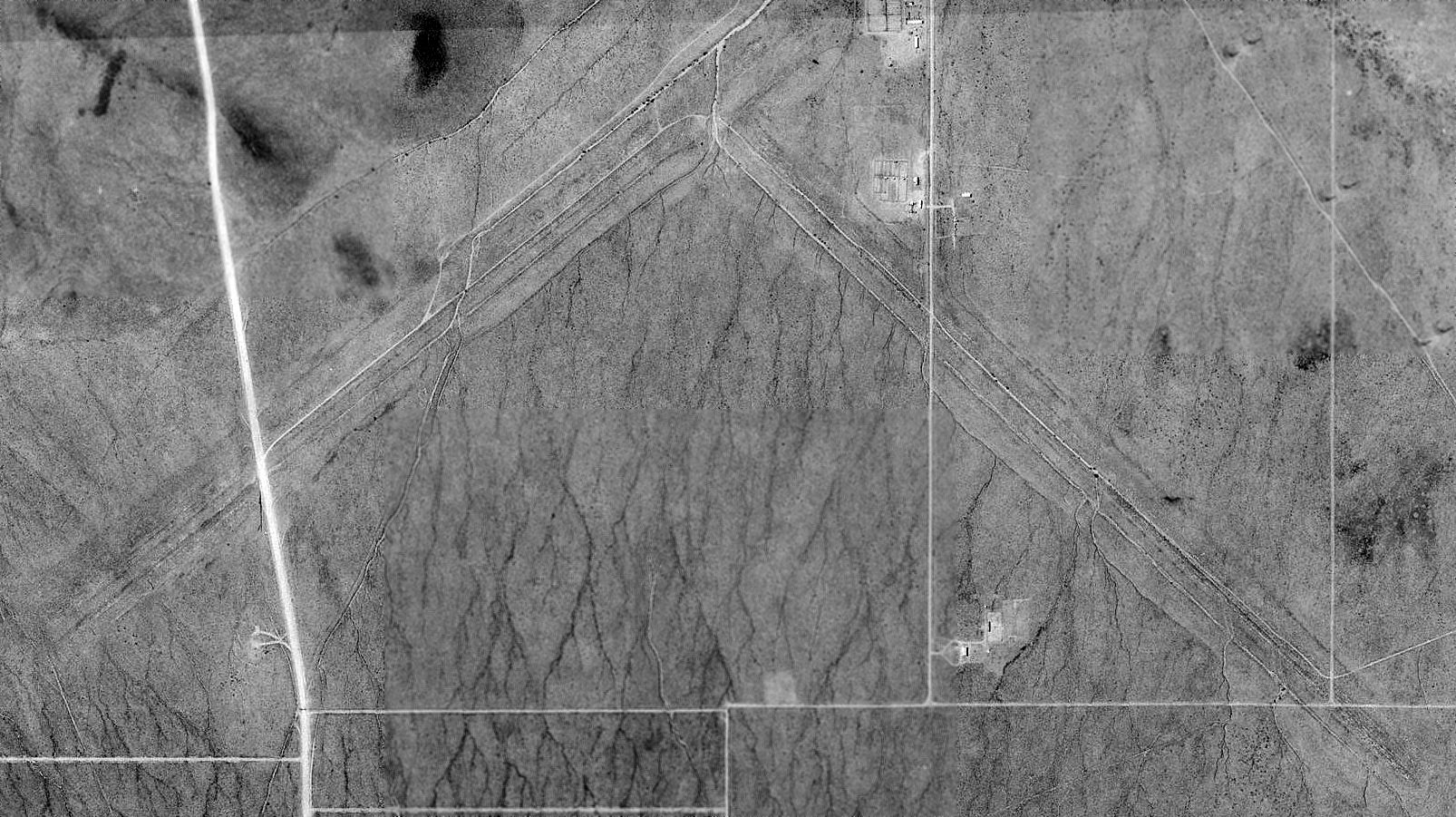
An aerial photograph of the Hackberry airfield in 1993; Antares Road is visible on the left.

The local airport, Music Mountain Air Ranch, operates two dirt runways, both of which had become overgrown by 2004. Formerly Kingman Number 3 Army Airfield and also known as Hackberry Airfield, the airport is located off Antares Road just to the north of the village—the western runway intersects the road. Kingman Airport is the closest commercial airport, 15 miles (24 km) west of Antares. The Kingman Army Airfield had opened during World War II. Laughlin/Bullhead International Airport in Bullhead City is the closest international airport, having formerly had charter flights to Canada, and is also relatively close. Phoenix Sky Harbor International Airport in Phoenix and Harry Reid International Airport in Las Vegas are the closest large international airports to Antares.

== Services ==
The Valle Vista District Fire Station #2 is located on Antares Road, half a mile north of State Route 66. Some electrical services for the nearby Hualapai Indian reservation are connected on Antares Road.

== Tourism ==
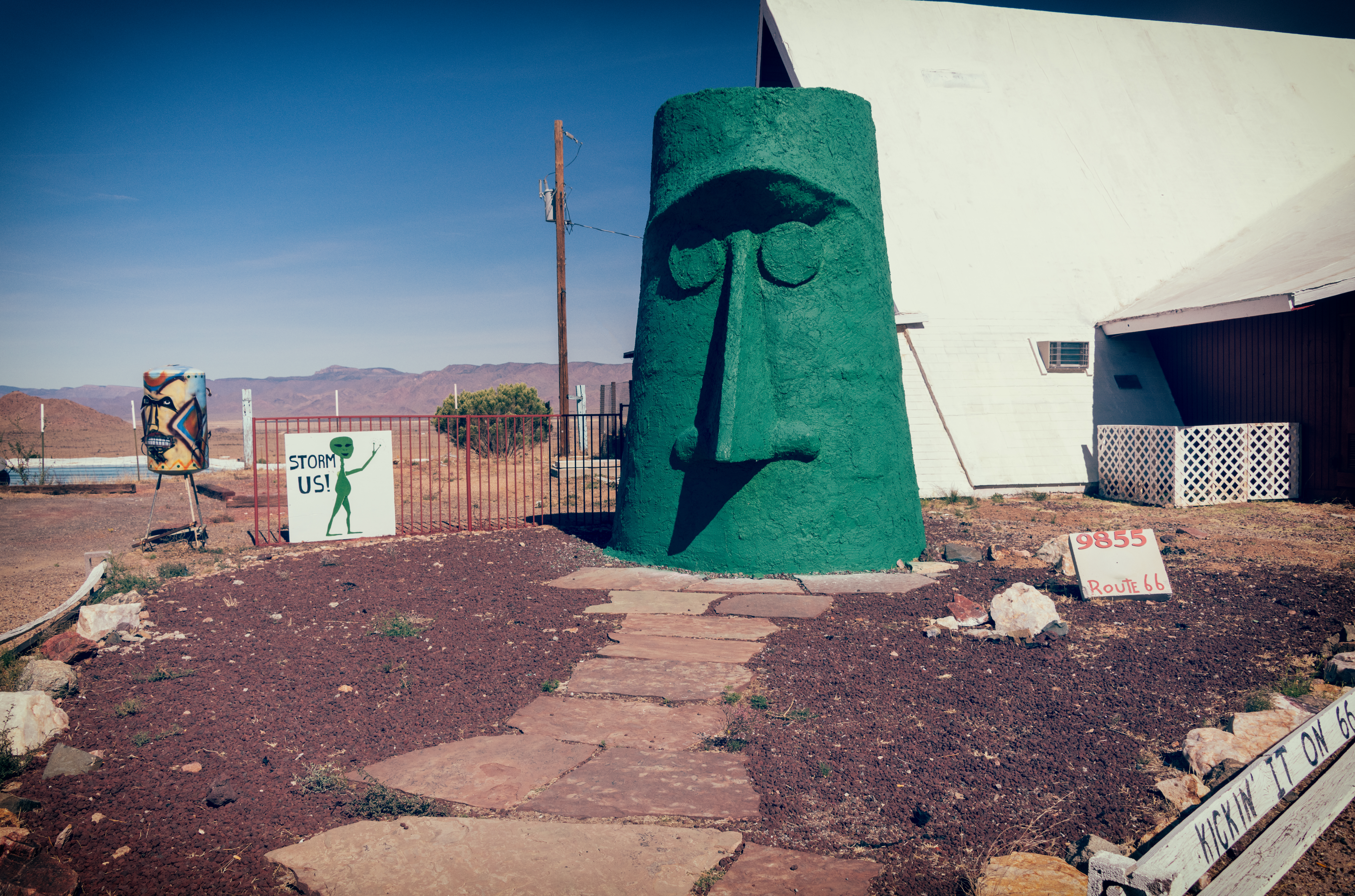
The Giant Head

The main destination in Antares is a camp park known both as Kozy Corner RV park and Ranchero Motel. The site also features the "Giganticus Headicus" attraction, a 14-foot-tall (4.3 m) homemade monument resembling the Easter Island heads. The park is on the Antares Point curve.

The RV park is isolated, bracketed between the Peacock Mountains and Route 66 and the Burlington Northern & Santa Fe Railway, which run parallel; it began as a camp for railroad workers in the early 1900s. A local legend claims that Gene Roddenberry stayed at the motel and named the Antares ship in Star Trek after its location.
