= Shaffer Springs =

Water source in Arizona

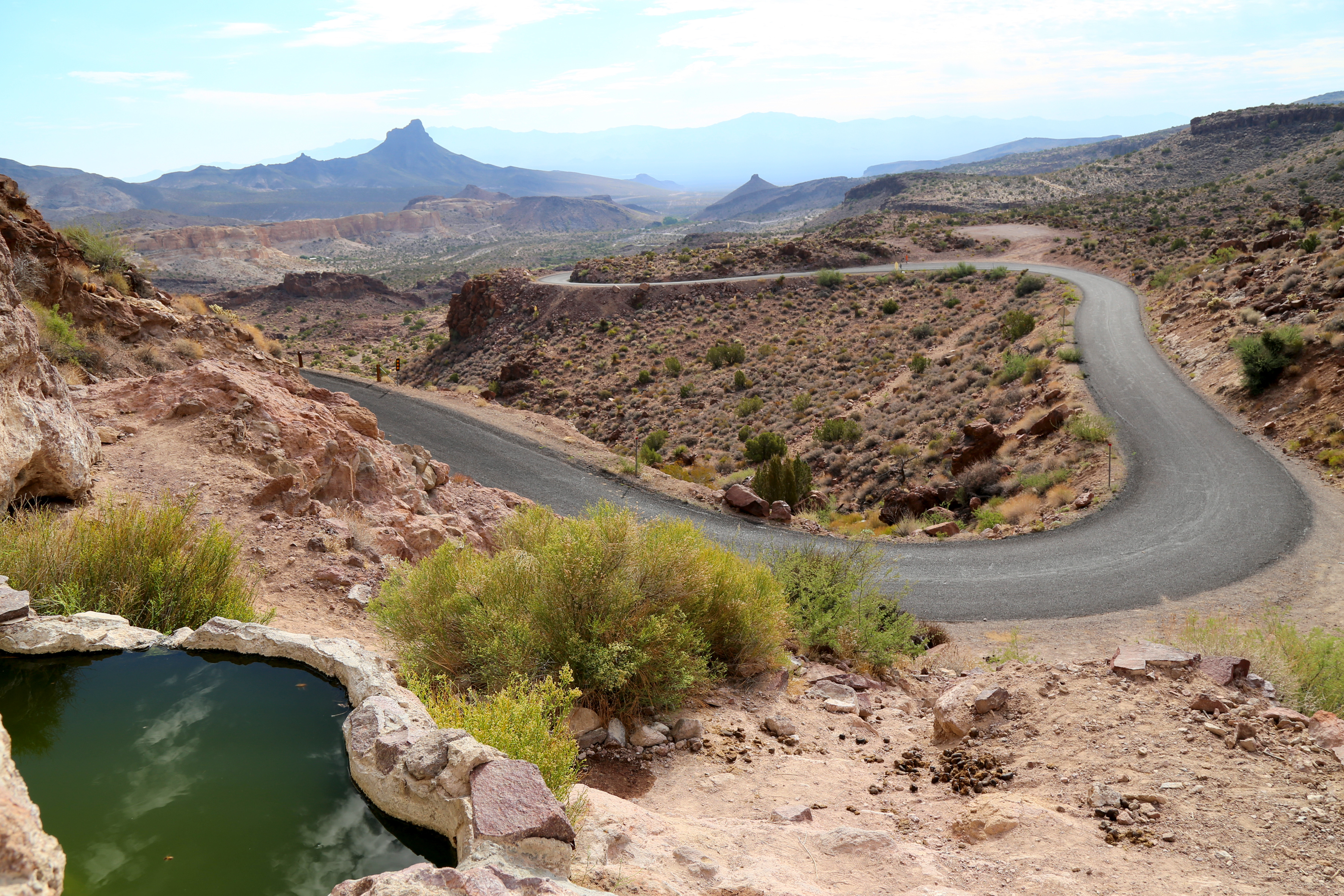
- Shafer Spring and historic Route 66
- Interactive map of Shaffer Springs
- Coordinates: 35.0386°N 114.35662°W

Shaffer Springs, sometimes called Shaffer's Fish Bowl, is a natural seep and minor roadside attraction in the Black Mountains of Arizona, United States. Located in Mohave County, alongside the old alignment of U.S. Route 66 (US 66) that runs between Kingman, Arizona and Oatman, the water from the seep flows into a manmade basin stocked with domestic goldfish. Shaffer Springs serves a vital water source for wild burros.

== Description and history ==
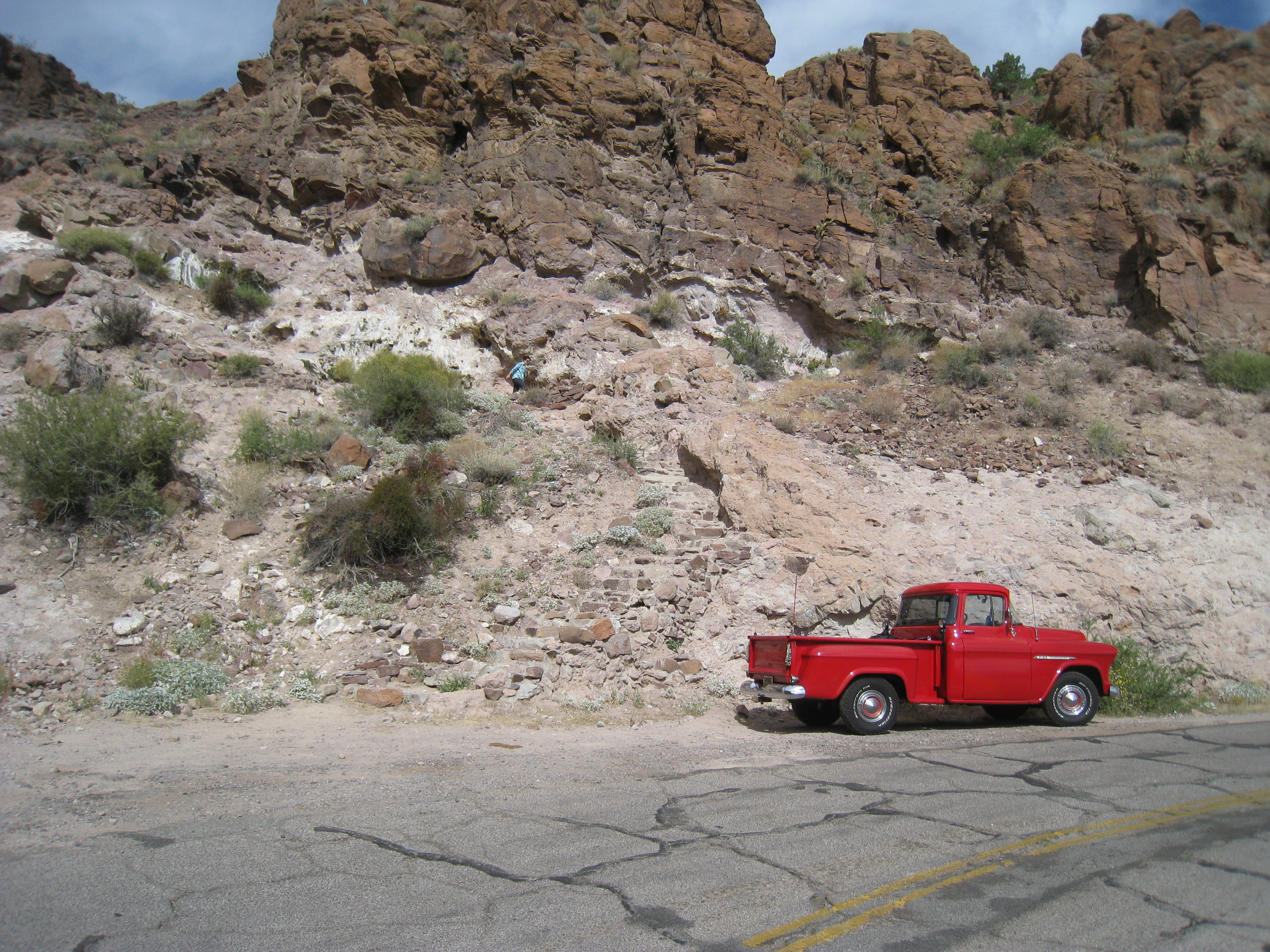
'55 Chevy, Route 66 at Shaffer Springs

Shaffer's Fish Bowl is located in Mohave County, Arizona, not far from the California border. The spring is on a stretch of Arizona highway known as the Goldroad because the area was once was a gold mining district. The Goldroad has "the steepest grade on all of Route 66".

The surrounding area is marked by "creosote-dotted sand flats" until the road makes a steep rise into the Black Mountains. Near the spring the road is mostly hairpin turns and "steep dropoffs" but the higher elevation has the benefit of offering scenic vistas of the surrounding country.

The history of the spring is as murky as the green-tinted water but most accounts credit the New Deal-era Civilian Conservation Corps or the Works Progress Administration for building the basin, which is made of local stone and concrete, and collects water that naturally seeps out of the cliffside at this point in the mountain range. According to Scenic Driving Arizona, "Early drivers filled waterbags at the spring, and in the 1950s the state highway department installed a hand-pump drinking fountain, which was removed a few years later." There are hand-cut stairs leading up to the basin; human visitors should be conscious that animal droppings left by wildlife can make the steps slippery and treacherous. The red flowers growing along the edge of the water are a native species known as crimson monkeyflower (Erythranthe verbenacea). The bowl is "stocked with goldfish" and/or snails in order to prevent algae growth and keep the water clean. The water is used by a population of naturalized burros that live in and around Oatman.

Other than the fishies, the main attraction of the stop is the view and the relative solitude. Arizona writer Roger Naylor comments of the site that "The stillness seems palpable. Traffic is thin, a whisper of engine noise that barely dents the expanse and is gone as soon as the vehicle rounds the next bend. I like to hunker here and—as unlikely as it seems while sitting in the Mojave Desert—watch goldfish swim."

== See also ==
- U.S. Route 66 in Arizona
  - U.S. Route 66 in Arizona § The golden age
- Sitgreaves Pass
- Radiator Springs
