= Artillery Peak mine =

Manganese mine in Arizona, United States

Coordinates: 34.3450°N 113.5696°W

- Interactive map of Artillery Peak mine

Location
- Location: Mohave County, Arizona, United States

Production
- Products: Manganese

Owner
- Company: Public Service of Oklahoma

The Artillery Peak mine is a mine located in the western United States, about 3 miles (4.8 km) north of Alamo Lake in Mohave County, Arizona. Artillery Peak represents one of the largest manganese reserves in the United States, with estimated reserves of 159 million tons of manganese ore graded 3.9% manganese metal.

It is currently not in production. Alternate names are Artillery Mountain Mine and Hanna Mine.
