= Bagdad Middle and High School =

Secondary school in Yavapai County, Arizona

Coordinates: 34.5741°N 113.1839°W

Location
- 500 Sultan Way; Bagdad, Arizona 86321; United States

Information
- School type: Public high school
- School district: Bagdad Unified School District
- CEEB code: 030010
- Principal: Tom Finnerty
- Teaching staff: 16.02 (FTE)
- Grades: 6-12
- Enrollment: 216 (2023–2024)
- Student to teacher ratio: 13.48
- Colors: Royal blue, silver and white
- Mascot: Sultans
- Website: sites.google.com/bagdadschools.org/busd20home/schools/bagdad-high-school?authuser=0

Bagdad Middle and High School is a junior high and high school in Bagdad, Arizona. It is the only high school in the Bagdad Unified School District,

Bagdad Middle and High School is accredited by Cognia, a division of AdvancED and participates in the Arizona Interscholastic Association. The District achieved the "A" letter grade by the Arizona Department of Education for academic performance rating for the 2021–2022 school year.

Bagdad's Middle School serves students in 7 – 8 grades. .In addition to traditional core classes, Middle School students are provided instruction in music, Art, P.E., Computers, Business and Welding Career Prep, Family and Consumer Science, and Industrial Technology.

Bagdad High School has initiated elective classes that support math education under the headings of Engineering, Career and Technical Programs and Aviation. The Aviation classes culminating activity is an actual flight from the Bagdad Airport. Bagdad students also participate in community service, fine arts and athletics.

The school has core academics: American Government, Biology, Anatomy & Physiology, Chemistry, Physics, Choir, Art / Graphic Design, Drama, Economics, Algebra I/II Geometry, College Algebra, Pre-Calculus, Health, History (U.S./world), Adv. Journalism, Language Arts, Music, Physical Fitness, Physics, Engineering, and Technology.

Career and Technical Education classes are varied with the additional resources available from the Mountain Institute Joint technological education district in conjunction with other Yavapai County Districts. Currently, the school offers approved programs in Auto, Business, Culinary, Building Trades, Welding, and Nursing (CNA).

== History ==
Circa 1993 there were political issues with the board of trustees and the school administration which culminated in the president of the board leaving his post.

== Attendance area ==
Owens-Whitney Elementary School District students may choose to attend Bagdad USD for high school.
