= Sitgreaves Pass =

Gap in the Black Mountains in Arizona, US

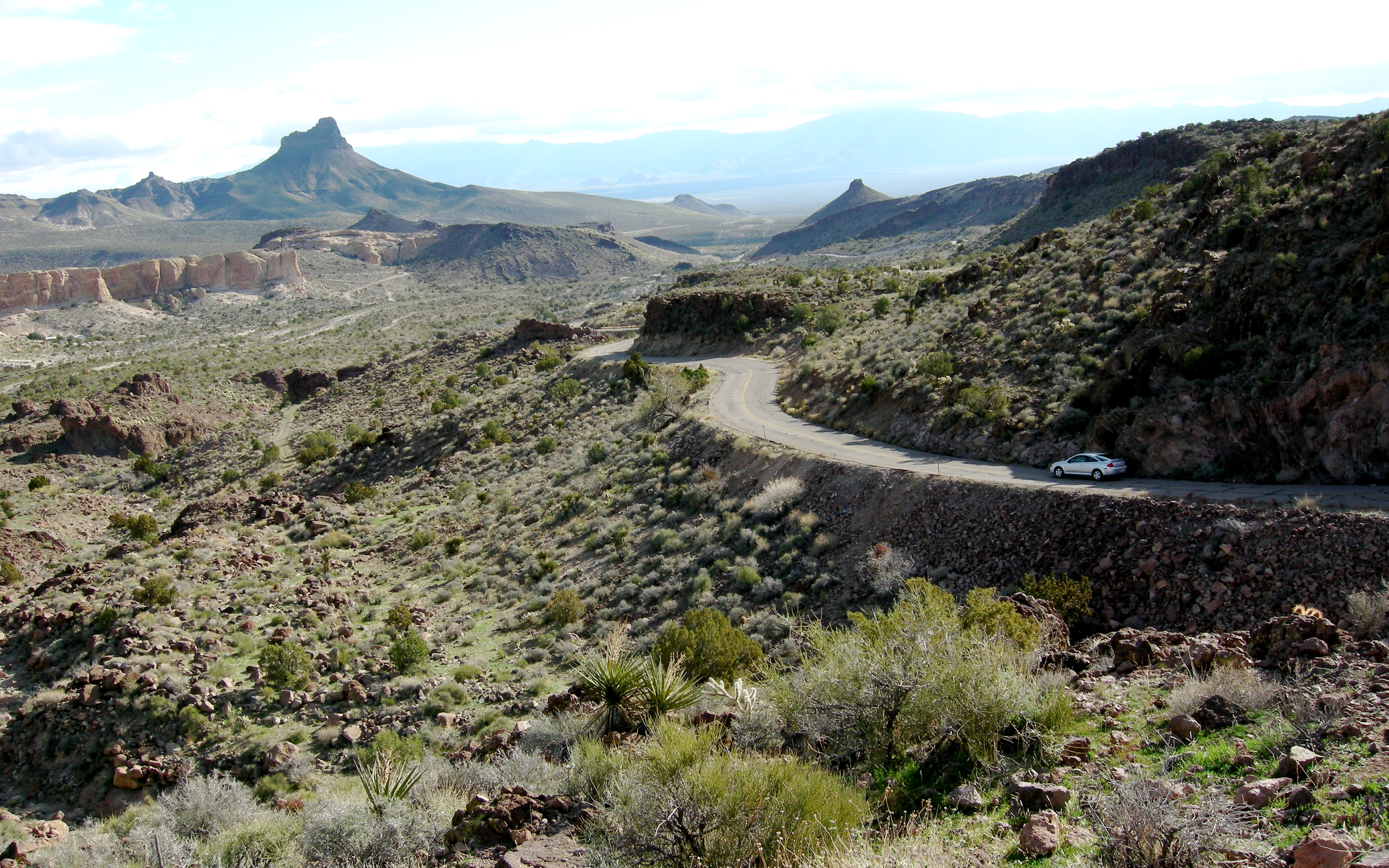
- View from Sitgreaves Pass
- Interactive map of Sitgreaves Pass
- Elevation: 3,586

Third Approach
- Location: Mohave County, Arizona, United States
- Range: Black Mountains
- Coordinates: 35°02′45″N 114°21′38″W

Sitgreaves Pass is a gap crossed by a road at an elevation of 3,586 feet / 1,093 meters, in the Black Mountains of Mohave County, Arizona. When Edward Fitzgerald Beale built Beale's Wagon Road over this pass, he named it John Howells Pass for one of the men in his expedition in October, 1857. Subsequently, the pass was named for Captain Lorenzo Sitgreaves, of the Corps of Topographical Engineers, who led the 1851 Expedition Down the Zuni and Colorado Rivers. Sitgreaves' expedition never crossed the Black Mountains by this pass, but did farther north, at Secret Pass or at Union Pass. Under the mistaken impression Sitgreaves and his expedition had crossed this pass, the name was given to it by Lieutenant Joseph Christmas Ives of the Corps of Topographical Engineers in March 1858, as he passed eastward to survey the Colorado Plateau on his way to Fort Defiance, following his exploration of the Colorado River.

The pass was a landmark on historic U.S. Route 66. It is now part of the 42-mile Route 66 Historic Back Country Byway, maintained by the Bureau of Land Management. The section of road that crosses Sitgreaves Pass is characterized by "hairpin curves and steep grades". The pass is located 4.4 miles northeast of Oatman, Arizona by road.

== See also ==
- County Route 10 (Mohave County, Arizona)
