= Mount Tipton School =

Coordinates: 35°36′10″N 114°15′20″W

Location
- 16500 Pierce Ferry Rd; Dolan Springs, Arizona 86441; United States

Information
- School type: Public school
- School district: Kingman Unified School District
- CEEB code: 030613
- Principal: Tony Victory
- Grades: K-6
- Enrollment: 189 (2023–2024)
- Colors: Black and gold
- Mascot: Panthers
- Website: www.kusd.org/tipton/home.htm

The Mount Tipton School is a K-6 public school in Dolan Springs, Arizona. It serves the towns of Meadview, White Hills, Chloride, and Dolan Springs. It is operated by the Kingman Unified School District.

In 2013, the Kingman Unified School District voted to convert the K-12 school into a K-6 school, due to the difficulty of finding high school and middle school teachers that are certified across multiple subjects as well as the need to close a $1.1 million budget gap across the district.
