= 2018 Arizona Attorney General election =

- November 6, 2018
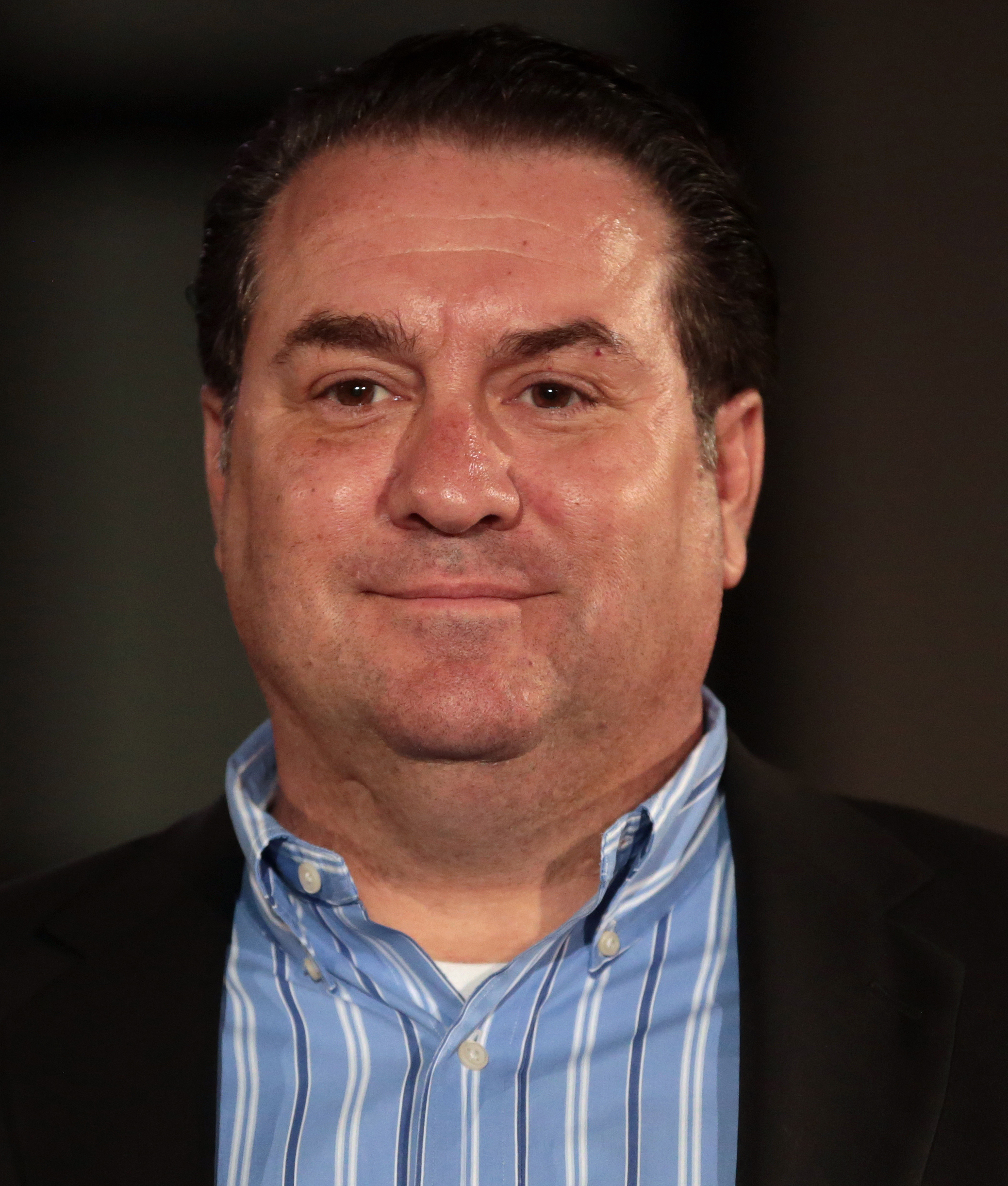

Nominee	Mark Brnovich	January Contreras
Party	Republican	Democratic
Popular vote	1,201,398	1,120,726
Percentage	51.73%	48.26%
- Brnovich: 50–60% 60–70% 70–80% 80–90% >90% Contreras: 40–50% 50–60% 60–70% 70–80% 80–90% >90% Tie: 50% No data
Attorney General before election
Mark Brnovich
Republican
Elected Attorney General
Mark Brnovich
Republican

The 2018 Arizona Attorney General election took place on November 6, 2018, to elect the attorney general of Arizona. Incumbent Republican Mark Brnovich won re-election to a second term, defeating former Arizona Department of Health Services Director January Contreras. Primaries took place on August 28, 2018.

== Republican primary ==
Brnovich won the Republican primary unopposed.

Republican primary results
Party	Candidate	Votes	%
Republican	Mark Brnovich (incumbent)	561,370	100.0
Total votes		561,370	100.0

== Democratic primary ==
January Contreras, former director of Arizona Department of Health Services and senior advisor to former U.S. Homeland Security Secretary Janet Napolitano, won the Democratic primary unopposed.

Democratic primary results
Party	Candidate	Votes	%
Democratic	January Contreras	464,510	100.0
Total votes		464,510	100.0

== Libertarian primary ==
Michael Kielsky, former Chair of the Arizona Libertarian Party, won the Libertarian nomination as a write-in candidate.

Libertarian primary results
Party	Candidate	Votes	%
Libertarian	Michael Kielsky (write-in)	2,156	100.0
Total votes		2,144	100.0

== General election ==
=== Predictions ===
Source	Ranking	As of
Governing	Lean R	October 26, 2018

=== Debate ===
One debate was hosted by Arizona PBS on October 10.

Dates	Brnovich	Contreras	Link
October 10, 2018	Participant	Participant	Full debate – AZCentral

=== Polling ===
Poll source	Date(s) administered	Sample size	Margin of error	Mark Brnovich (R)	January Contreras (D)	Undecided
OH Predictive Insights	September 5–6, 2018	597	± 4.0%	48%	36%	16%
Data Orbital	October 1–3, 2018	550	± 4.2%	46%	33%	19%

=== Results ===
Brnovich won the general election by a 3.47% margin of victory.

General election results
Party	Candidate	Votes	%
Republican	Mark Brnovich (incumbent)	1,201,398	51.73%
Democratic	January Contreras	1,120,726	48.26%
Write-in		346	0.01%
Total votes		2,322,470	100.00%
Republican hold			

==== By congressional district ====
Despite losing the state, Contreras won five of nine congressional districts.

District	Brnovich	Contreras	Representative
1st	49.892%	49.894%	Tom O'Halleran
2nd	46%	54%	Ann Kirkpatrick
3rd	35%	65%	Raúl Grijalva
4th	69%	31%	Paul Gosar
5th	61%	39%	Andy Biggs
6th	56%	44%	David Schweikert
7th	26%	74%	Ruben Gallego
8th	60%	40%	Debbie Lesko
9th	42%	58%	Greg Stanton
