= White Hills, Arizona =

Census-designated places in Mohave County, Arizona

- Census-designated place
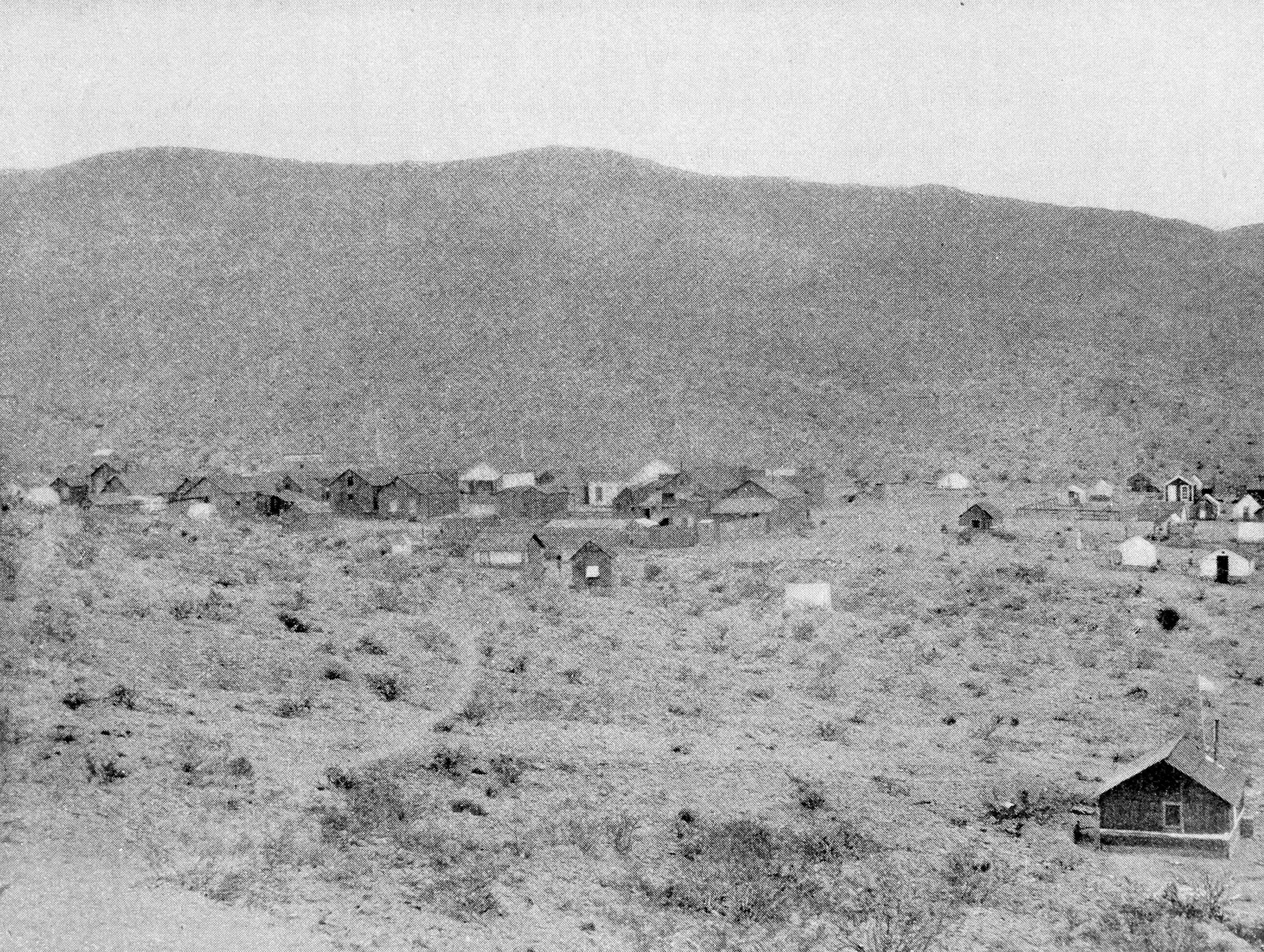
- White Hills Mining Camp (1898)

- Location in Mohave County, Arizona

- Location within Arizona Location within the United States
- Coordinates: 35°44′17″N 114°23′51″W
- Country: United States
- State: Arizona
- County: Mohave

Area
  - Total: 51.92 sq mi (134.48 km^{2})
  - Land: 51.92 sq mi (134.48 km^{2})
  - Water: 0 sq mi (0.00 km^{2})
- Elevation: 2,792 ft (851 m)

Population (2020)
  - Total: 345
  - Density: 6.7/sq mi (2.57/km^{2})
- Time zone: UTC-7 (Mountain (MST))
- ZIP code: 86445
- Area code: 928
- GNIS feature ID: 24687
- FIPS code: 04-82425

White Hills is an unincorporated community and census-designated place (CDP) in Mohave County, Arizona, United States. It is 12.5 miles (20.1 km) northwest of Dolan Springs. As of the 2020 census, White Hills had a population of 345.

== History ==
In 1892, Henry Shaffer discovered silver deposits in the area, with the help of local Native Americans. The resulting mining efforts led to the creation of the town of White Hills, which reportedly grew to a population of 1,500. The mines consisted of 27 miles (43 km) of tunnels, and a full fifteen mines were being worked within one mile (1.6 km) of the town. In 1894, the White Hills Mining Company was formed to run the operations, but they sold out in 1895 for a price of $1,500,000. The new owners, part of an English company, constructed a 40-stamp mill in the town. However, water had to be piped in from 7 miles (11 km) away, and the supply was never able to meet the mine and mill's demands. Production peaked in 1898, and soon after the mill began operating only half of the time. The town went into decline, and eventually became a ghost town.

White Hills received media attention in 2014 when Charles Vacca, a shooting instructor, was accidentally shot and killed by a 9-year-old girl at a local gun range.

In 2020, NextEra Energy began construction of a long-planned 127-turbine wind farm in the White Hills area, with initial power output expected by the end of the year. Southern California Clean Power Alliance has a 20-year power purchase agreement for 300 megawatts from the wind farm.

== Geography ==
White Hills is in northwestern Mohave County, in the Detrital Valley and at the base of the White Hills, which rise to the east. U.S. Route 93 runs through the west side of the CDP, leading southeast 42 miles (68 km) to Kingman, the Mohave county seat, and northwest 64 miles (103 km) to Las Vegas, Nevada.

== Demographics ==
Historical population
Census	Pop.	Note	%±
2010	323		—
2020	345		6.8%
U.S. Decennial Census

== Education ==
The CDP is in the Kingman Unified School District.
