= Owens-Whitney Elementary School District =

School district in Arizona, United States

Owens Whitney School District 6

Location
- 14109 East Chicken Springs Road; Wikieup, Arizona 85360 United States

Other information
- Website: www.owens-whitney.org

Owens Whitney School District 6 a.k.a. Owens School District No. 6 is a public school district based in Mohave County, Arizona.

The district includes Wikieup and sections of the Hualapai Indian Reservation.

For senior high school, students may choose between the Bagdad Unified School District or the Kingman Unified School District.

== History ==
In 1984, the district had 44 students and four teachers, with one of them also being the principal. That year the district had proposed having a four day school week to save money, and the Arizona Board of Education approved the proposal. It would begin in fall 1984. In 1987 all members of the state board decided that Owens-Whitney could continue having four days per week instruction.

== Student body ==
As of 1984 multiple students lived at least 15 miles (24 km) away from the school, with one around 40 miles (64 km) away.
