= Clacks Canyon, Arizona =

CDP in Mohave County, Arizona

- Census-designated place
- Location within Arizona Location within the United States
- Coordinates: 35°14′08″N 114°04′44″W
- Country: United States
- State: Arizona
- County: Mohave

Area
  - Total: 3.32 sq mi (8.60 km^{2})
  - Land: 3.32 sq mi (8.60 km^{2})
  - Water: 0 sq mi (0.00 km^{2})
- Elevation: 3,740 ft (1,140 m)

Population (2020)
  - Total: 167
  - Density: 50.3/sq mi (19.41/km^{2})
- Time zone: UTC-7 (MST)
- Area code: 928
- FIPS code: 04-13850
- GNIS feature ID: 2582758

Clacks Canyon is a census-designated place (CDP) in Mohave County, Arizona, United States. The population was 167 at the 2020 census.

== Geography ==
Clacks Canyon is located in central Mohave County and is bordered to the south and east by Kingman, the county seat. The community is named for the valley that runs through it, leading south into Kingman, with the outflow continuing southwest to the Sacramento Valley.

Interstate 40 crosses the southeast corner of the CDP, with the closest access from Exit 48 (U.S. Route 93) 0.6 miles (1.0 km) to the south.

== Demographics ==
Historical population
Census	Pop.	Note	%±
2010	173		—
2020	167		−3.5%
U.S. Decennial Census

As of the 2010 census, there were 173 people living in the CDP: 82 male and 91 female. 39 were 19 years old or younger, 13 were ages 20–34, 32 were between the ages of 35 and 49, 54 were between 50 and 64, and the remaining 35 were aged 65 and above. The median age was 50.4 years.

The racial makeup of the CDP was 94.2% White, 0.6% Asian, 3.5% Other, and 1.7% Two or more races. 3.5% of the population were Hispanic or Latino of any race.

There were 69 households in the CDP, 53 family households (76.8%) and 16 non-family households (23.2%), with an average household size of 2.51. Of the family households, 42 were married couples living together, 3 were single fathers, and 8 were single mothers, while the non-family households consisted of 15 adults living alone: 10 male and 5 female.

The CDP contained 83 housing units, of which 69 were occupied and 14 were vacant.

== Education ==
The CDP is in the Kingman Unified School District.
