= Kingman Unified School District =

School district in Arizona, United States

Address
- 3033 McDonald Avenue Kingman, Arizona, 86401; United States

District information
- Type: Public
- Grades: PreK–12
- Established: 2001; 24 years ago
- NCES District ID: 0400295

Students and staff
- Students: 6,651
- Teachers: 337.15
- Staff: 470.01
- Student–teacher ratio: 19.73

Other information
- Website: www.kusd.org

The Kingman Unified School District is the school district for Kingman, Arizona and nearby areas. It includes 11 schools. It was founded in 2001 with the merger of the Kingman Elementary School District No. 4, Mohave Union High School District No. 30, Chloride School District No. 11 and the Dolan Springs School District.

== Boundary ==
The district includes Kingman and the following census-designated places: Chloride, Clacks Canyon, Dolan Springs, Golden Valley, Lazy Y U, McConnico, Meadview, New Kingman-Butler, Pine Lake, Pinion Pines, So-Hi, Valle Vista, Walnut Creek, White Hills. A very small portion of Grand Canyon West is in the district.

Owens-Whitney Elementary School District students may choose to attend Kingman USD for high school. Additionally, since 2008 Peach Springs Unified School District of Peach Springs sends its high school students to other districts, one of them Kingman USD. Previously Peach Springs operated its own high school, Music Mountain Junior/Senior High School.

== Schools ==
High schools

- Kingman High School
- Lee Williams High School

Middle schools

- Kingman Middle
- White Cliffs

Elementary schools

- Black Mountain
- Cerbat
- Desert Willow
- Hualapai
- Manzanita
- Mt. Tipton (serves Dolan Springs) - Formerly K-12, but now K-6
