= Lazy Y U, Arizona =

- Census-designated place
- Location within Arizona Location within the United States
- Coordinates: 35°08′13″N 113°58′06″W
- Country: United States
- State: Arizona
- County: Mohave

Area
  - Total: 15.71 sq mi (40.69 km^{2})
  - Land: 15.71 sq mi (40.69 km^{2})
  - Water: 0 sq mi (0.00 km^{2})
- Elevation: 4,456 ft (1,358 m)

Population (2020)
  - Total: 474
  - Density: 30.2/sq mi (11.65/km^{2})
- Time zone: UTC-7 (MST)
- ZIP code: 86401
- Area code: 928
- FIPS code: 04-40400
- GNIS feature ID: 2582814

Lazy Y U is an unincorporated community and census-designated place (CDP) in Mohave County, Arizona, United States. The population was 474 at the 2020 census, up from 428 at the 2010 census.

== Geography ==
Lazy Y U is located in central Mohave County. It is 9 miles (14 km) by road southeast of the center of Kingman, the Mohave county seat. According to the United States Census Bureau, the CDP has a total area of 15.71 square miles (40.7 km^{2}), all land.

== Demographics ==
Historical population
Census	Pop.	Note	%±
2010	428		—
2020	474		10.7%
U.S. Decennial Census

As of the 2010 census, there were 428 people living in the CDP: 226 male and 202 female. 93 were 19 years old or younger, 21 were ages 20–34, 80 were between the ages of 35 and 49, 163 were between 50 and 64, and the remaining 71 were aged 65 and above. The median age was 51.9 years.

The racial makeup of the CDP was 90.9% White, 1.2% Native Hawaiian or Other Pacific Islander, 0.7% Asian, 0.7% Black or African American, 0.5% American Indian or Alaska Native, 3.0% Other, and 3.0% Two or More Races. 4.9% of the population were Hispanic or Latino of any race.

There were 169 households in the CDP, 147 family households (87%) and 22 non-family households (13%), with an average household size of 2.53. Of the family households, 138 were married couples living together, while 7 were single fathers and 2 were single mothers; the non-family households included 16 adults living alone: 10 male and 6 female.

The CDP contained 194 housing units, of which 169 were occupied and 25 were vacant.

== Education ==
The CDP is in the Kingman Unified School District.
