= Dolan Springs, Arizona =

CDP in Mohave County, Arizona, US

- Census-designated place
- Location in Mohave County and the state of Arizona

- Location within Arizona Location within the United States
- Coordinates: 35°36′57″N 114°15′39″W
- Country: United States
- State: Arizona
- County: Mohave

Area
  - Total: 58.12 sq mi (150.54 km^{2})
  - Land: 58.12 sq mi (150.54 km^{2})
  - Water: 0 sq mi (0.00 km^{2})
- Elevation: 3,294 ft (1,004 m)

Population (2020)
  - Total: 1,989
  - Density: 29.8/sq mi (11.52/km^{2})
- Time zone: UTC-7 (MST)
- ZIP code: 86441
- Area code: 928
- FIPS code: 04-19630
- GNIS feature ID: 2408678

Dolan Springs is an unincorporated community and census-designated place (CDP) in Mohave County, Arizona, United States. The population was 1,989 according to the 2020 census, down from 2,033 in the 2010 census.

== Geography ==
Dolan Springs is located in north-central Mohave County. U.S. Route 93 forms the western boundary of the community, which extends northeast across Detrital Valley and into a smaller valley between the Cerbat Mountains to the south and Table Mountain Plateau to the north. The town center is 6 miles (10 km) northeast of US 93, along County Highway 25 (Pierce Ferry Road). US 93 leads southeast 30 miles (48 km) to Kingman, the Mohave county seat, and northwest 47 miles (76 km) to Boulder City, Nevada.

According to the United States Census Bureau, the Dolan Springs CDP has a total area of 58.1 square miles (150 km^{2}), all land.

== Demographics ==
Historical population
Census	Pop.	Note	%±
2000	1,867		—
2010	2,033		8.9%
2020	1,734		−14.7%
U.S. Decennial Census

=== 2020 census ===
As of the 2020 census, Dolan Springs had a population of 1,734. The median age was 59.8 years. 12.1% of residents were under the age of 18 and 36.0% of residents were 65 years of age or older. For every 100 females there were 114.3 males, and for every 100 females age 18 and over there were 115.6 males age 18 and over.

The population density was 29.8 people per square mile (11.5/km^{2}). 0.0% of residents lived in urban areas, while 100.0% lived in rural areas.

There were 837 households in Dolan Springs, of which 11.2% had children under the age of 18 living in them. Of all households, 42.5% were married-couple households, 30.6% were households with a male householder and no spouse or partner present, and 18.9% were households with a female householder and no spouse or partner present. About 36.5% of all households were made up of individuals and 19.0% had someone living alone who was 65 years of age or older.

There were 1,320 housing units, of which 36.6% were vacant. The homeowner vacancy rate was 2.6% and the rental vacancy rate was 6.7%.

Racial composition as of the 2020 census
Race	Number	Percent
White	1,330	76.7%
Black or African American	14	0.8%
American Indian and Alaska Native	25	1.4%
Asian	14	0.8%
Native Hawaiian and Other Pacific Islander	5	0.3%
Some other race	127	7.3%
Two or more races	219	12.6%
Hispanic or Latino (of any race)	348	20.1%

=== Income and poverty ===
According to the U.S. Census American Community Survey, for the period 2016–2020 the estimated median annual income for a household in the CDP was $28,292, and the median income for a family was $47,821. About 41% of the population were living below the poverty line, including 88% of those under age 18 and 12% of those age 65 or over. About 25% of the population were employed, and 14% of the population had a bachelor's degree or higher.

== Education ==
Dolan Springs is part of the Kingman Unified School District and has an elementary school, Mount Tipton School.

== Emergency services ==
EMS response in the Dolan Springs area can take hours. The Lake Mohave Ranchos Fire District has one ambulance that covers 2,200 square miles of Mohave County. The LMRFD ambulance covers the first 50 miles of US 93 from milepost one at Hoover Dam to milepost 50 near Dolan Springs, and from the Hualapai Indian reservation to the Nevada and Arizona border at the Colorado River.

The LMRFD staffs one Firefighter/EMT, and one Firefighter/paramedic. In Meadview, Paid on Call (or overtime for full-time) personnel man the station. There are also volunteers.

The section of US Route 93 in Arizona was ranked as the most dangerous highway in the U.S. This 200-mile-long road runs between Wickenburg, Arizona, and the Hoover Dam Bypass Bridge, also known as the Mike O'Callaghan–Pat Tillman Memorial Bridge, near Nevada's border. Many drivers use this route when driving between Las Vegas and Phoenix. Most of the fatal crashes occur along the segment in Mohave County, Arizona. Overall, 70 fatal crashes reportedly took place on this highway from 2010 to 2016.

Recent changes to the intersection of US 93 and Pierce Ferry, the road to the Grand Canyon West, and the addition of several truck stops on US 93 north of Dolan Springs have made the highway far more dangerous. Slow speed trucks entering and crossing US 93 create a situation for high-speed crashes. In 2022 there have been several fatal crashes between milepost-1 and milepost-50 on US 93.

=== Response Times ===
Response times can be long in the LMRFD, at times taking hours for EMS to arrive. If the LMRFD is responding to a call in Meadview when an accident near Hoover Dam has occurred, it can take over four hours for EMS to arrive to the Hoover Dam.

Medical helicopters respond to accidents on US 93, but protocols don't allow them to transport a patient until a firefighter from the LMRFD has arrived and assessed the patient.

Emergency medical service units average more than 14 minutes in rural settings, with nearly 1 of 10 encounters waiting almost a half hour for the arrival of EMS personnel. Longer EMS response times have been associated with worse outcomes in trauma patients.

== See also ==
- List of census-designated places in Arizona
