= Mohave County, Arizona =

County in Arizona, United States

- County
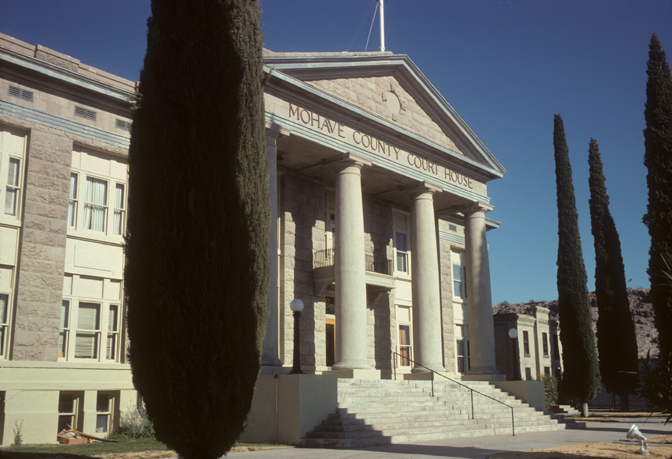
- Mohave County Courthouse in Kingman

- Seal

- Location within the U.S. state of Arizona
- Coordinates: 35°40′55″N 113°51′47″W
- Country: United States
- State: Arizona
- Founded: November 9, 1864
- Named for: Fort Mohave
- Seat: Kingman
- Largest city: Lake Havasu City

Area
  - Total: 13,461 sq mi (34,860 km^{2})
  - Land: 13,311 sq mi (34,480 km^{2})
  - Water: 150 sq mi (390 km^{2}) 1.1%

Population (2020)
  - Total: 213,267
  - Estimate (2025): 228,102 ▲
  - Density: 16.022/sq mi (6.1861/km^{2})
- Time zone: UTC−7 (Mountain)
- Congressional districts: 2nd, 9th
- Website: www.mohave.gov

Mohave County (/moʊˈhɑːvi/ moh-HAH-vee) occupies the northwestern corner of the U.S. state of Arizona, one of 15 counties in the state. As of the 2020 census, its population was 213,267. The county seat is Kingman, and the largest city is Lake Havasu City. It is the fifth largest county in the United States (by area).

Mohave County makes up the Lake Havasu City–Kingman, Arizona Metropolitan Statistical Area.

Mohave County contains parts of Grand Canyon National Park and Lake Mead National Recreation Area and all of the Grand Canyon–Parashant National Monument. The Kaibab, Fort Mojave and Hualapai Indian Reservations also lie within the county.

== History ==
Mohave County was the one of four original Arizona Counties created by the 1st Arizona Territorial Legislature. The county territory was originally defined as being west of longitude 113° 20' and north of the Bill Williams River. Pah-Ute County was created from it in 1865 and was merged back into Mohave County in 1871 when much of its territory was ceded to Nevada in 1866. The county's present boundaries were established in 1881. The county was also home to a large polygamous Fundamentalist Church of Jesus Christ of Latter-Day Saints sect located in Colorado City.

Mohave County has had five county seats: Mohave City (1864–1867), Hardyville (1867–1873), Cerbat (1873–1877), Mineral Park (1877–1887), and Kingman (since 1887).

== Geography ==
According to the United States Census Bureau, the county has a total area of 13,461 square miles (34,860 km^{2}), of which 13,311 square miles (34,480 km^{2}) is land and 150 square miles (390 km^{2}) (1.1%) is water. It is the second-largest county by area in Arizona and the fifth-largest in the contiguous United States.

The county consists of two sections divided by the Grand Canyon, with no direct land connection between them. The northern section, smaller and less populated, forms the western part of the Arizona Strip, bordering Utah and Nevada. The larger southern section borders Nevada and California across the Colorado River, which forms most of the county's western boundary. The southern section includes Kingman, the county seat, and other cities, as well as part of the Mojave Desert.

=== Adjacent counties ===
- Washington County, Utah – north
- Kane County, Utah – northeast
- Coconino County – east
- Yavapai County – east
- La Paz County – south
- San Bernardino County, California – southwest
- Clark County, Nevada – west
- Lincoln County, Nevada – northwest

Mohave County and its adjacent counties form the largest such block of counties outside of Alaska. Their combined land area is 89,567.34 square miles (231,978.3 km^{2}), or larger than that of the state of Idaho. They include the #1 (San Bernardino), #2 (Coconino), #5 (Mohave), and #7 (Lincoln) largest counties outside of Alaska. If Nye County, Nevada- which is #3 for total county area that does not border Mohave but borders neighboring Lincoln and Clark counties is included, then the combined land area would be 107,726.34 squard miles or larger than the state of Colorado.

=== National protected areas ===
- Bill Williams River National Wildlife Refuge (part)
- Grand Canyon National Park (part)
- Grand Canyon–Parashant National Monument
- Havasu National Wildlife Refuge (part)
- Kaibab National Forest (part)
- Lake Mead National Recreation Area (part)
- Pipe Spring National Monument

There are 18 official wilderness areas in Mohave County that are part of the National Wilderness Preservation System. Most of these are managed by the Bureau of Land Management, but some are integral parts of the preceding protected areas, or have shared jurisdiction with the BLM. Some extend into neighboring counties (as indicated below) All wilderness areas within Grand Canyon–Parashant National Monument are managed by BLM, although the National Monument shares management with the National Park Service:

- Arrastra Mountain Wilderness (BLM) partly in Yavapai County, Arizona, and La Paz County, Arizona
- Aubrey Peak Wilderness (BLM)
- Beaver Dam Mountains Wilderness (BLM) partly in Washington County, Utah
- Cottonwood Point Wilderness (BLM)
- Grand Wash Cliffs Wilderness (Grand Canyon–Parashant NM) managed by BLM
- Havasu Wilderness (Havasu NWR) partly in San Bernardino County, California
- Kanab Creek Wilderness (Kaibab NF / BLM) mostly in Coconino County, Arizona
- Mount Logan Wilderness (Grand Canyon–Parashant NM) managed by BLM
- Mount Nutt Wilderness (BLM)
- Mount Tipton Wilderness (BLM)
- Mount Trumbull Wilderness (Grand Canyon–Parashant NM) managed by BLM
- Mount Wilson Wilderness (BLM)
- Paiute Wilderness (partly in Grand Canyon–Parashant NM) managed by BLM
- Rawhide Mountains Wilderness (BLM) mostly in La Paz County, Arizona
- Swansea Wilderness (BLM) mostly in La Paz County, Arizona
- Upper Burro Creek Wilderness (BLM) mostly in Yavapai County, Arizona
- Wabayuma Peak Wilderness (BLM)
- Warm Springs Wilderness (BLM)

== Demographics ==
Historical population
Census	Pop.	Note	%±
1870	179		—
1880	1,190		564.8%
1890	1,444		21.3%
1900	3,426		137.3%
1910	3,773		10.1%
1920	5,259		39.4%
1930	5,572		6.0%
1940	8,591		54.2%
1950	8,510		−0.9%
1960	7,736		−9.1%
1970	25,857		234.2%
1980	55,865		116.1%
1990	93,497		67.4%
2000	155,032		65.8%
2010	200,186		29.1%
2020	213,267		6.5%
2025 (est.)	228,102	▲	7.0%
U.S. Decennial Census; 1790–1960 1900–1990; 1990–2000 2010–2020

=== Racial and ethnic composition ===
Mohave County, Arizona – Racial and ethnic composition Note: the US Census treats Hispanic/Latino as an ethnic category. This table excludes Latinos from the racial categories and assigns them to a separate category. Hispanics/Latinos may be of any race.
Race / Ethnicity (NH = Non-Hispanic)	2020	2010	2000	1990	1980
White alone (NH)	75.1% (160,165)	79.6% (159,378)	84% (130,283)	91.8% (85,808)	92.9% (51,876)
Black alone (NH)	1% (2,063)	0.9% (1,715)	0.5% (787)	0.3% (291)	0.1% (68)
American Indian alone (NH)	1.9% (4,053)	1.9% (3,793)	2.1% (3,238)	2.1% (1,919)	2.8% (1,561)
Asian alone (NH)	1.2% (2,600)	1% (2,016)	0.7% (1,118)	0.5% (514)	0.3% (195)
Pacific Islander alone (NH)	0.2% (365)	0.2% (316)	0.1% (151)		
Other race alone (NH)	0.3% (690)	0.1% (145)	0.1% (128)	0% (46)	0.1% (30)
Multiracial (NH)	4.3% (9,205)	1.6% (3,254)	1.4% (2,145)	—	—
Hispanic/Latino (any race)	16% (34,126)	14.8% (29,569)	11.1% (17,182)	5.3% (4,919)	3.8% (2,135)

=== American Community Survey 2025 data ===
The United States Census Bureau estimated that in 2025, Mohave County’s population was 228.102. It was also estimated that the county's population was 73,16% Non-Hispanic White, 18,69% Hispanic or Latino, 1,25% Non-Hispanic Black, 1,44% Asian, 1,91% Native American, 0,18% Pacific Islander, and 3,38% Multiracial.

Total	Population	Percentage
Non-Hispanic White	166,880	73.16%
Hispanic or Latino	42,625	18.69%
Non-Hispanic Black	2,854	1.25%
Asian	3,275	1.44%
Native American	4,362	1.91%
Pacific Islander	405	0.18%
Non-Hispanic Multiracial	7,701	3.38%

=== 2020 census ===
As of the 2020 census, the county had a population of 213,267. Of the residents, 16.8% were under the age of 18 and 31.0% were 65 years of age or older; the median age was 53.8 years. For every 100 females there were 102.5 males, and for every 100 females age 18 and over there were 101.8 males. 76.1% of residents lived in urban areas and 23.9% lived in rural areas.

The racial makeup of the county was 79.6% White, 1.0% Black or African American, 2.4% American Indian and Alaska Native, 1.3% Asian, 0.2% Native Hawaiian and Pacific Islander, 5.9% from some other race, and 9.5% from two or more races. Hispanic or Latino residents of any race comprised 16.0% of the population.

There were 91,270 households in the county, of which 19.9% had children under the age of 18 living with them and 24.1% had a female householder with no spouse or partner present. About 29.6% of all households were made up of individuals and 17.0% had someone living alone who was 65 years of age or older.

There were 117,650 housing units, of which 22.4% were vacant. Among occupied housing units, 71.7% were owner-occupied and 28.3% were renter-occupied. The homeowner vacancy rate was 2.3% and the rental vacancy rate was 8.0%.

=== 2010 census ===
As of the census of 2010, there were 200,186 people, 82,539 households, and 54,036 families living in the county. The population density was 15.0 inhabitants per square mile (5.8/km^{2}). There were 110,911 housing units at an average density of 8.3 units per square mile (3.2 units/km^{2}). The racial makeup of the county was 86.9% white, 2.2% American Indian, 1.1% Asian, 0.9% black or African American, 0.2% Pacific islander, 6.0% from other races, and 2.7% from two or more races. Those of Hispanic or Latino origin made up 14.8% of the population. In terms of ancestry, 23.1% were German, 16.2% were Irish, 15.6% were English, 5.7% were Italian, and 4.5% were American.

Of the 82,539 households, 24.5% had children under the age of 18 living with them, 49.5% were married couples living together, 10.4% had a female householder with no husband present, 34.5% were non-families, and 26.7% of all households were made up of individuals. The average household size was 2.39 and the average family size was 2.86. The median age was 47.6 years.

The median income for a household in the county was $39,785 and the median income for a family was $47,530. Males had a median income of $36,222 versus $28,060 for females. The per capita income for the county was $21,523. About 11.6% of families and 16.1% of the population were below the poverty line, including 24.7% of those under age 18 and 7.0% of those age 65 or over.

=== 2000 census ===
As of the census of 2000, there were 155,032 people, 62,809 households, and 43,401 families living in the county. The population density was 12 people per square mile (4.6 people/km^{2}). There were 80,062 housing units at an average density of 6 units per square mile (2.3 units/km^{2}). The racial makeup of the county was 90.1% White, 0.5% Black or African American, 2.4% Native American, 0.8% Asian, 0.1% Pacific Islander, 4.0% from other races, and 2.1% from two or more races. 11.1% of the population were Hispanic or Latino of any race.

There were 62,809 households, out of which 25.1% had children under the age of 18 living with them, 55.1% were married couples living together, 9.3% had a female householder with no husband present, and 30.9% were non-families. 24.1% of all households were made up of individuals, and 11.3% had someone living alone who was 65 years of age or older. The average household size was 2.45 and the average family size was 2.87.

In the county, the population was spread out, with 23.1% under the age of 18, 6.5% from 18 to 24, 23.2% from 25 to 44, 26.7% from 45 to 64, and 20.5% who were 65 years of age or older. The median age was 43 years. For every 100 females there were 98.90 males. For every 100 females age 18 and over, there were 96.80 males.

The median income for a household in the county was $31,521, and the median income for a family was $36,311. Males had a median income of $28,505 versus $20,632 for females. The per capita income for the county was $16,788. About 9.8% of families and 13.9% of the population were below the poverty line, including 20.4% of those under age 18 and 7.7% of those age 65 or over.

== Politics, government, and infrastructure ==
No Democratic presidential nominee has carried Mohave County since Lyndon Johnson in 1964. He managed a narrow victory of 152 votes over Arizona native Barry Goldwater despite Goldwater’s home state advantage.

United States presidential election results for Mohave County, Arizona
Year	Republican		Democratic		Third party(ies)	
Year	No.	%	No.	%	No.	%
1912	69	8.56%	320	39.70%	417	51.74%
1916	643	28.89%	1,335	59.97%	248	11.14%
1920	996	57.97%	722	42.03%	0	0.00%
1924	738	38.00%	475	24.46%	729	37.54%
1928	1,127	60.33%	728	38.97%	13	0.70%
1932	537	23.52%	1,660	72.71%	86	3.77%
1936	609	24.08%	1,814	71.73%	106	4.19%
1940	1,198	37.16%	2,024	62.78%	2	0.06%
1944	974	42.64%	1,303	57.05%	7	0.31%
1948	1,167	43.03%	1,499	55.27%	46	1.70%
1952	1,746	62.09%	1,066	37.91%	0	0.00%
1956	1,523	60.99%	968	38.77%	6	0.24%
1960	1,641	55.59%	1,303	44.14%	8	0.27%
1964	2,091	48.19%	2,243	51.69%	5	0.12%
1968	3,208	51.64%	2,109	33.95%	895	14.41%
1972	6,755	68.92%	2,588	26.41%	458	4.67%
1976	7,601	51.92%	6,504	44.43%	535	3.65%
1980	13,809	68.86%	4,900	24.43%	1,345	6.71%
1984	17,364	69.26%	7,436	29.66%	272	1.08%
1988	17,651	62.40%	10,197	36.05%	438	1.55%
1992	13,684	33.69%	13,255	32.63%	13,677	33.67%
1996	17,997	43.33%	16,629	40.04%	6,907	16.63%
2000	24,386	55.25%	17,470	39.58%	2,285	5.18%
2004	36,794	63.53%	20,503	35.40%	618	1.07%
2008	44,333	65.20%	22,092	32.49%	1,570	2.31%
2012	49,168	69.91%	19,533	27.77%	1,627	2.31%
2016	58,282	72.90%	17,455	21.83%	4,206	5.26%
2020	78,535	75.01%	24,831	23.72%	1,339	1.28%
2024	85,683	77.57%	24,081	21.80%	693	0.63%

The Mohave County Administration Building is located in downtown Kingman at 700 West Beale Street. The old County Complex, which the Administration Building replaced, was located adjacent to the courthouse on Spring Street and 4th Street. The Mohave County Superior Courthouse, built in 1915, is an Art Deco/Streamline Moderne building on the National Register of Historic Places. The county jail is adjacent to the County Administration Building at 501 S. Highway 66.

Arizona State Prison – Kingman, a privately run prison of the Arizona Department of Corrections, is located in unincorporated Mohave County near Golden Valley and Kingman.

== Education ==
=== K-12 school districts ===
The following school districts serve Mohave County:

Unified school districts

- Colorado City Unified School District
- Fredonia-Moccasin Unified District
- Kingman Unified School District
- Lake Havasu Unified School District
- Littlefield Unified School District
- Peach Springs Unified School District – While it is a USD, it sends its high school students to other districts

High school districts

- Colorado River Union High School District

Elementary school districts

- Bullhead City Elementary School District
- Hackberry School District
- Mohave Valley Elementary School District
- Owens-Whitney Elementary School District
- Topock Elementary School District
- Valentine Elementary School District
- Yucca Elementary School District

Additionally there is a charter school:

- Kingman Academy of Learning

=== Colleges ===
- Mohave Community College
- Arizona State University - Lake Havasu City Campus

=== Public libraries ===
The Mohave County Library has ten branches. The branches in Bullhead City, Kingman and Lake Havasu City are open 56 hours a week. The branch in Mohave Valley is open 40 hours a week. Branches in Chloride, Dolan Springs, Golden Shores, Golden Valley, Meadview and Valle Vista are open 15 hours a week.

== Transportation ==
=== Major highways ===
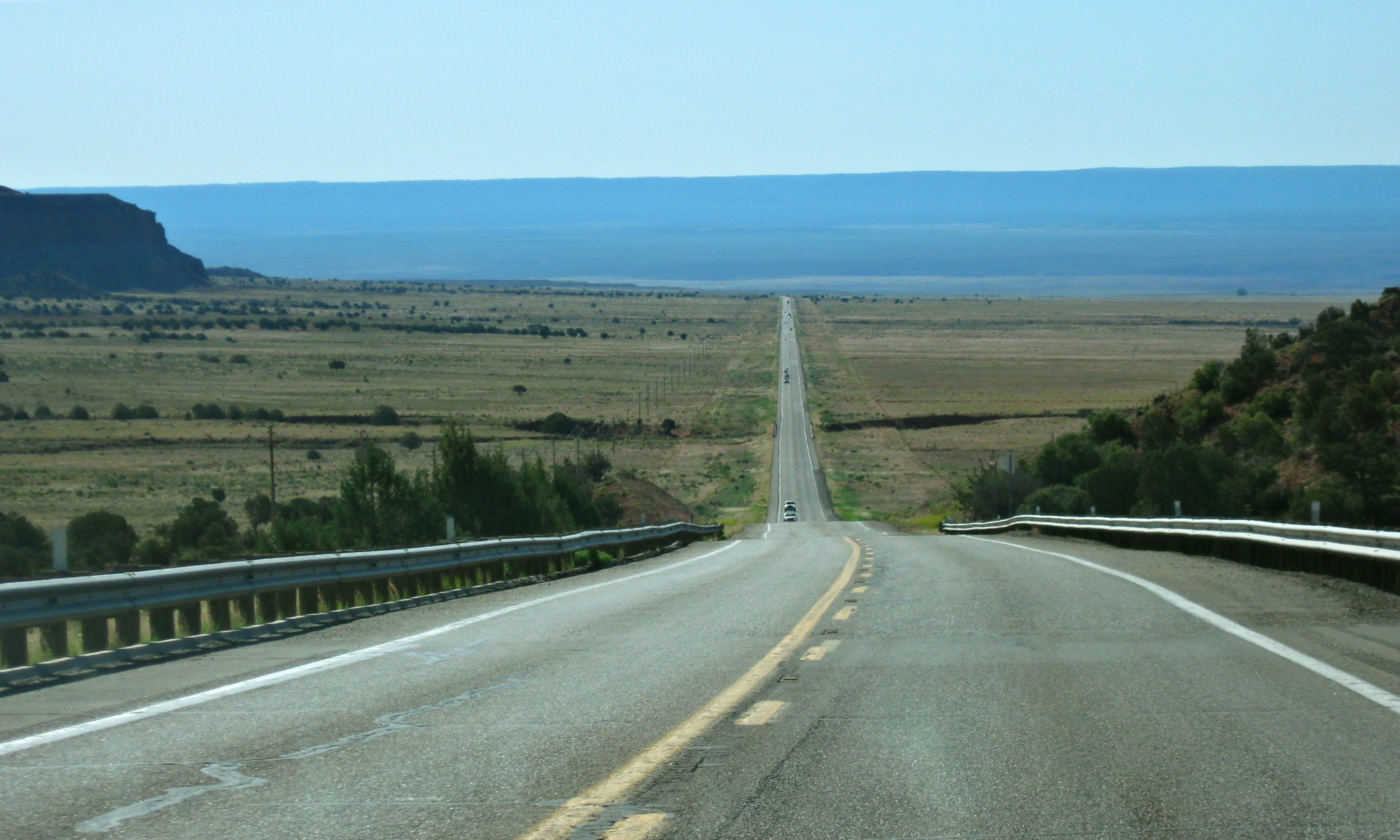
State Route 389 in Mohave County

- Future I-11
- I-15
- I-40
- US 93
- SR 66
- SR 68
- SR 95
- SR 389

=== Airports ===
The following public use airports are located in Mohave County:

- Bullhead City – Eagle Airpark (A09)
- Bullhead City – Laughlin-Bullhead International Airport (IFP)
- Bullhead City – Sun Valley Airport (A20)
- Colorado City – Colorado City Municipal Airport (AZC)
- Kingman – Kingman Airport (IGM)
- Lake Havasu City – Lake Havasu City Airport (HII)
- Meadview – Pearce Ferry Airport (L25)
- Peach Springs – Grand Canyon West Airport (1G4)
- Temple Bar – Temple Bar Airport (U30)

== Communities ==
=== Cities ===
- Bullhead City
- Kingman (county seat)
- Lake Havasu City

=== Town ===
- Colorado City

=== Census-designated places ===
- Antares
- Arizona Village
- Beaver Dam
- Cane Beds
- Centennial Park
- Chloride
- Clacks Canyon
- Crozier
- Crystal Beach
- Desert Hills
- Dolan Springs
- Fort Mohave
- Golden Shores
- Golden Valley
- Grand Canyon West
- Hackberry
- Kaibab
- Katherine
- Lazy Y U
- Littlefield
- McConnico
- Meadview
- Mesquite Creek
- Moccasin
- Mohave Valley
- Mojave Ranch Estates
- New Kingman-Butler
- Oatman
- Peach Springs
- Pine Lake
- Pinion Pines
- Scenic
- So-Hi
- Topock
- Truxton
- Valentine
- Valle Vista
- Walnut Creek
- White Hills
- Wikieup
- Willow Valley
- Yucca

=== Ghost towns ===
- Alamo Crossing
- Aubrey Landing
- Camp Beale Springs
- Cedar
- Cerbat
- Cottonia
- Cyclopic
- Fort Mohave
- Frisco
- Germa
- Golconda
- Gold Basin
- Goldflat
- Goldroad
- Grand Gulch
- Grasshopper Junction
- Greenwood City
- Hardyville
- Henning
- Lincolnia
- Liverpool Landing
- Lost Basin
- Macnab
- McCracken
- Mellen
- Mineral City
- Mineral Park
- Mockingbird
- Mohave City
- Mount Trumbull
- Nothing
- Old Trails
- Pearce Ferry
- Polhamus Landing
- Powell
- Pyramid
- Sandy
- Santa Claus
- Signal
- Snowball
- Stockton
- Tuweep
- Virginia City
- Vivian
- Willow Ranch
- Wolf Hole

=== Indian communities ===
- Fort Mojave Indian Reservation
- Kaibab Indian Reservation
- Hualapai Indian Reservation

=== County population ranking ===
The population ranking of the following table is based on the 2010 census of Mohave County.

† county seat

Rank	City/Town/etc.	Population (2010 Census)	Municipal type	Incorporated
1	Lake Havasu City	52,527	City	1978
2	Bullhead City	39,540	City	1984
3	† Kingman	28,068	City	1952
4	Fort Mohave	14,364	CDP	
5	New Kingman-Butler	12,134	CDP	
6	Golden Valley	8,370	CDP	
7	Colorado City	4,821	Town	1913 (founded)
8	Mohave Valley	2,616	CDP	
9	Desert Hills	2,245	CDP	
10	Golden Shores	2,047	CDP	
11	Dolan Springs	2,033	CDP	
12	Beaver Dam	1,962	CDP	
13	Valle Vista	1,659	CDP	
14	Scenic	1,643	CDP	
15	Centennial Park	1,264	CDP	
16	Meadview	1,224	CDP	
17	Peach Springs	1,090	CDP	
18	Willow Valley	1,062	CDP	
19	Arizona Village	946	CDP	
20	Walnut Creek	562	CDP	
21	So-Hi	477	CDP	
22	Cane Beds	448	CDP	
23	Lazy Y U	428	CDP	
24	Mesquite Creek	416	CDP	
25	White Hills	323	CDP	
26	Littlefield	308	CDP	
27	Crystal Beach	279	CDP	
28	Chloride	271	CDP	
29	Pinion Pines	186	CDP	
30	Clacks Canyon	173	CDP	
31	Pine Lake	138	CDP	
32	Oatman	135	CDP	
33	Truxton	134	CDP	
34	Wikieup	133	CDP	
t-35	Antares	126	CDP	
t-35	Yucca	126	CDP	
36	Kaibab (partially in Coconino County)	124	CDP	
37	Katherine	103	CDP	
38	Moccasin	89	CDP	
39	McConnico	70	CDP	
40	Hackberry	68	CDP	
41	Mojave Ranch Estates	52	CDP	
42	Valentine	38	CDP	
43	Crozier	14	CDP	
44	Topock	10	CDP	
45	Grand Canyon West	2	CDP	

== Economy ==
=== Mining ===
- Artillery Peak mine

== See also ==
- National Register of Historic Places listings in Mohave County, Arizona
- Upper Burro Creek Wilderness
- Shaffer Springs
