= Pinion Pines, Arizona =

- Census-designated place
- Location within Arizona Location within the United States
- Coordinates: 35°08′48″N 113°54′21″W
- Country: United States
- State: Arizona
- County: Mohave

Area
  - Total: 1.50 sq mi (3.89 km^{2})
  - Land: 1.50 sq mi (3.89 km^{2})
  - Water: 0 sq mi (0.00 km^{2})
- Elevation: 5,082 ft (1,549 m)

Population (2020)
  - Total: 158
  - Density: 105/sq mi (40.6/km^{2})
- Time zone: UTC-7 (MST)
- ZIP code: 86401
- Area code: 928
- FIPS code: 04-55983
- GNIS feature ID: 2582846

Pinion Pines is an unincorporated community and census-designated place (CDP) in Mohave County, Arizona, United States. The population was 158 at the 2020 census.

== Geography ==
Pinion Pines is located in central Mohave County at the north end of the Hualapai Mountains. It is 10 miles (16 km) southeast of Kingman, the county seat, via Hualapai Mountain Road and DW Ranch Road. According to the United States Census Bureau, the CDP has a total area of 1.5 square miles (3.9 km^{2}), all land.

== Demographics ==
Historical population
Census	Pop.	Note	%±
2010	186		—
2020	158		−15.1%
U.S. Decennial Census

As of the 2010 census, there were 186 people living in the CDP: 87 male and 99 female. 35 were 19 years old or younger, 12 were ages 20–34, 33 were between the ages of 35 and 49, 57 were between 50 and 64, and the remaining 49 were aged 65 and above. The median age was 54.7 years.

The racial makeup of the CDP was 95.2% White, 0.5% Asian, 3.8 Other, and 0.5% two or more races. 5.4% of the population were Hispanic or Latino of any race.

There were 80 households in the CDP, 58 family households (72.5%) and 22 non-family households (27.5%), with an average household size of 2.33. Of the family households, 48 were married couples living together, while there were 4 single fathers and 6 single mothers; the non-family households included 17 adults living alone: 5 male and 12 female.

The CDP contained 102 housing units, of which 80 were occupied and 22 were vacant.

As of July 2016, the average home value in Pinion Pines was $338,487. The average household income was $69,544, with a per capita income of $30,311.

== Education ==
The CDP is in the Kingman Unified School District.
