= Mojave Ranch Estates, Arizona =

CDP in Mohave County, Arizona

Mojave Ranch Estates
- Census-designated place
- Location in Mohave County and the state of Arizona

- Location within Arizona Location within the United States
- Coordinates: 34°56′42″N 114°35′26″W
- Country: United States
- State: Arizona
- County: Mohave

Area
  - Total: 0.75 sq mi (1.94 km^{2})
  - Land: 0.75 sq mi (1.94 km^{2})
  - Water: 0 sq mi (0.00 km^{2})
- Elevation: 479 ft (146 m)

Population (2020)
  - Total: 53
  - Density: 70.8/sq mi (27.35/km^{2})
- Time zone: UTC-7 (MST)
- ZIP code: 86440
- Area code: 928
- FIPS code: 04-47495
- GNIS feature ID: 2408854

Mojave Ranch Estates is an unincorporated community and census-designated place (CDP) in Mohave County, Arizona, United States. The population was 53 as of the 2020 census.

== Geography ==
Mojave Ranch Estates is in western Mohave County. It is bordered to the south by the CDP of Mohave Valley. Arizona State Route 95 forms the western edge of the CDP; it leads north 15 miles (24 km) to Bullhead City and south 7 miles (11 km) to Needles, California, across the Colorado River.

According to the United States Census Bureau, the CDP has a total area of 0.7 square miles (1.8 km^{2}), all land.

== Demographics ==
Historical population
Census	Pop.	Note	%±
2000	28		—
2010	52		85.7%
2020	53		1.9%
U.S. Decennial Census

As of the census of 2000, there were 28 people, 6 households, and 6 families living in the CDP. The population density was 37.7 inhabitants per square mile (14.6/km^{2}). There were 6 housing units at an average density of 8.1 per square mile (3.1/km^{2}). The racial makeup of the CDP was 46% White, 25% Native American, 15% from other races, and 14% from two or more races. 79% of the population were Hispanic or Latino of any race.

There were 6 households, out of which 100% had children under the age of 18 living with them, 83% were married couples living together, and 17% had a female householder with no husband present. No households were made up of individuals, and none had someone living alone who was 65 years of age or older. The average household size was 4.7 and the average family size was 4.7.

In the CDP, the population was spread out, with 43% under the age of 18, 11% from 18 to 24, 25% from 25 to 44, and 21% from 45 to 64. The median age was 22 years. For every 100 females, there were 64.7 males. For every 100 females age 18 and over, there were 100.0 males.

The median income for a household in the CDP was $42,917, and the median income for a family was $42,917. Males had a median income of $11,786 versus $17,188 for females. The per capita income for the CDP was $8,359. None of the population and none of the families were below the poverty line.
