= So-Hi, Arizona =

CDP in Mohave County, Arizona

- Census-designated place
- Location within Arizona Location within the United States
- Coordinates: 35°15′02″N 114°08′29″W
- Country: United States
- State: Arizona
- County: Mohave

Area
  - Total: 0.88 sq mi (2.27 km^{2})
  - Land: 0.88 sq mi (2.27 km^{2})
  - Water: 0 sq mi (0.00 km^{2})
- Elevation: 3,452 ft (1,052 m)

Population (2020)
  - Total: 428
  - Density: 489/sq mi (188.7/km^{2})
- Time zone: UTC-7 (MST (no DST))
- FIPS code: 04-67920
- GNIS feature ID: 2582867

So-Hi is an unincorporated community and census-designated place in Mohave County, in the U.S. state of Arizona. The population was 428 at the 2020 census, down from 477 in 2010.

== Geography ==
So-Hi is in central Mohave County, 8 miles (13 km) northwest of Kingman, the county seat. U.S. Route 93 runs past the south end of the community, leading southeast into Kingman and northwest 100 miles (160 km) to Las Vegas, Nevada.

== Demographics ==
Historical population
Census	Pop.	Note	%±
2010	477		—
2020	428		−10.3%
U.S. Decennial Census

== Education ==
The CDP is in the Kingman Unified School District.
