= Pine Lake, Arizona =

- Census-designated place
- Location within Arizona Location within the United States
- Coordinates: 35°05′16″N 113°52′44″W
- Country: United States
- State: Arizona
- County: Mohave

Area
  - Total: 1.69 sq mi (4.37 km^{2})
  - Land: 1.69 sq mi (4.37 km^{2})
  - Water: 0 sq mi (0.00 km^{2})
- Elevation: 6,283 ft (1,915 m)

Population (2020)
  - Total: 142
  - Density: 84.1/sq mi (32.48/km^{2})
- Time zone: UTC-7 (MST)
- ZIP code: 86401
- Area code: 928
- FIPS code: 04-55845
- GNIS feature ID: 2582844

Pine Lake is an unincorporated community and census-designated place (CDP) in Mohave County, Arizona, United States. The population was 142 at the 2020 census.

== Geography ==
Pine Lake is located in central Mohave County on the east side of the Hualapai Mountains. It is 14 miles (23 km) southeast of Kingman, the county seat, via Hualapai Mountain Road. The community is bordered on the west, south, and east by Hualapai Mountain Park, managed by Mohave County.

According to the United States Census Bureau, the CDP has a total area of 1.69 square miles (4.4 km^{2}), all of it recorded as land. However, Pine Lake, a small reservoir, is in the southeast corner of the community. The lake drains into Wheeler Wash, which runs east to Knight Creek and is part of the Big Sandy River drainage area, running south to the Bill Williams River, which in turn leads west to the Colorado River at Lake Havasu.

== Demographics ==
Historical population
| Census | Pop. | Note | %± |
|---|---|---|---|
| 2010 | 138 | | — |
| 2020 | 142 | | 2.9% |
U.S. Decennial Census

As of the 2010 census, there were 138 people living in the CDP: 72 male and 66 female. 10 were 19 years old or younger, 7 were ages 20–34, 22 were between the ages of 35 and 49, 58 were between 50 and 64, and the remaining 41 were aged 65 and above. The median age was 59 years.

The racial makeup of the CDP was 96.4% White, 1.4% Native American, 0.7% Other, and 1.4% two or more races. 4.3% of the population were Hispanic or Latino of any race.

There were 70 households in the CDP, 50 family households (71.4%) and 20 non-family households (28.6%), with an average household size of 1.97. Of the family households, 45 were married couples living together, while there were 2 single fathers and 3 single mothers; the non-family households included 13 adults living alone: 8 male and 5 female.

The CDP contained 156 housing units, of which 70 were occupied and 86 were vacant.

As of July 2016, the average home value in Pine Lake was $333,955. The average household income was $67,392, with a per capita income of $30,281.

== Education ==
The CDP is in the Kingman Unified School District.
