= Walnut Creek, Arizona =

- Census-designated place
- Location in Mohave County, Arizona

- Location within Arizona Location within the United States
- Coordinates: 35°07′42″N 114°07′36″W
- Country: United States
- State: Arizona
- County: Mohave

Area
  - Total: 1.53 sq mi (3.97 km^{2})
  - Land: 1.53 sq mi (3.97 km^{2})
  - Water: 0 sq mi (0.00 km^{2})
- Elevation: 2,782 ft (848 m)

Population (2020)
  - Total: 571
  - Density: 372/sq mi (143.7/km^{2})
- Time zone: UTC-7 (MST (no DST))
- ZIP code: 86413
- Area code: 928
- FIPS code: 04-80825
- GNIS feature ID: 2582896

Walnut Creek is an unincorporated community and census-designated place (CDP) in Mohave County, in the U.S. state of Arizona. The population was 571 at the 2020 census.

== Geography ==
Walnut Creek is in central Mohave County, 6 miles (10 km) southwest of Kingman, the county seat. Interstate 40 passes to the east of the community, with access from Exit 44. County Route 10 (Oatman Highway) is the main road through the CDP.

=== Climate ===
Climate data for Walnut Creek, Arizona (1991–2020)
Month	Jan	Feb	Mar	Apr	May	Jun	Jul	Aug	Sep	Oct	Nov	Dec	Year
Mean daily maximum °F (°C)	53.9 (12.2)	57.9 (14.4)	65.1 (18.4)	72.0 (22.2)	79.6 (26.4)	89.2 (31.8)	91.6 (33.1)	89.5 (31.9)	84.7 (29.3)	74.6 (23.7)	62.5 (16.9)	52.5 (11.4)	72.8 (22.6)
Daily mean °F (°C)	37.9 (3.3)	40.8 (4.9)	46.0 (7.8)	51.4 (10.8)	58.5 (14.7)	66.8 (19.3)	73.1 (22.8)	71.7 (22.1)	65.3 (18.5)	54.6 (12.6)	43.9 (6.6)	36.6 (2.6)	53.9 (12.2)
Mean daily minimum °F (°C)	21.9 (−5.6)	23.6 (−4.7)	26.9 (−2.8)	30.9 (−0.6)	37.5 (3.1)	44.4 (6.9)	54.6 (12.6)	53.9 (12.2)	46.0 (7.8)	34.7 (1.5)	25.3 (−3.7)	20.8 (−6.2)	35.0 (1.7)
Average precipitation inches (mm)	1.51 (38)	1.86 (47)	1.15 (29)	0.56 (14)	0.40 (10)	0.25 (6.4)	1.84 (47)	2.57 (65)	1.50 (38)	1.00 (25)	0.89 (23)	1.23 (31)	14.76 (373.4)
Average snowfall inches (cm)	0.3 (0.76)	1.8 (4.6)	1.0 (2.5)	0.5 (1.3)	0.0 (0.0)	0.0 (0.0)	0.0 (0.0)	0.0 (0.0)	0.0 (0.0)	0.0 (0.0)	0.3 (0.76)	1.6 (4.1)	5.5 (14.02)
Source: NOAA

== Demographics ==
Historical population
Census	Pop.	Note	%±
2010	562		—
2020	571		1.6%
U.S. Decennial Census

== Education ==
The CDP is in the Kingman Unified School District.
