= New Kingman-Butler, Arizona =

CDP in Mohave County, Arizona

- Census-designated place
- Location in Mohave County and the state of Arizona

- Location within Arizona Location within the United States
- Coordinates: 35°15′49″N 113°59′50″W
- Country: United States
- State: Arizona
- County: Mohave

Area
  - Total: 4.97 sq mi (12.87 km^{2})
  - Land: 4.97 sq mi (12.87 km^{2})
  - Water: 0 sq mi (0.00 km^{2})
- Elevation: 3,356 ft (1,023 m)

Population (2020)
  - Total: 12,907
  - Density: 2,597/sq mi (1,002.6/km^{2})
- Time zone: UTC-7 (MST)
- ZIP Code: 86409 (Kingman)
- FIPS code: 04-49270
- GNIS feature ID: 2408919

New Kingman-Butler is an unincorporated community and census-designated place (CDP) in Mohave County, Arizona, United States, directly north of and bordering the city of Kingman. The population was 12,907 as of the 2020 census.

== Name and history ==
New Kingman-Butler was named for Leroy Butler, who was the original land developer of the unincorporated community. "New Kingman" was the name of the original real estate development, but it is seldom used by residents except in a historical sense. The area commonly is referred to simply as "Butler". Butler is a distinct locale among the neighborhoods of Kingman.

Butler makes up a substantial amount of the land area of the Kingman area as a whole, but is unincorporated, and is governed directly by Mohave County. There have been numerous plans and attempts to annex all or parts of Butler into the city of Kingman over the years, since it is an integral part of the Kingman community, but each has failed. One major problem with annexation into Kingman is the fact that Butler does not have a developed sanitary sewer system; all residences and buildings in Butler have individual septic tanks. The costs of developing and connecting a sewer system to all customers in Butler, if annexed into Kingman, is considerable. The fiscal assets required for such an investment by the City of Kingman likely could not be raised without assessment of a primary property tax on all landowners in the city; however, no such primary parcel tax has been approved by voters.

== Geography ==
New Kingman-Butler is located in central Mohave County and is bordered to the west by an extension of the city limits of Kingman, the county seat. Downtown Kingman is 7 miles (11 km) to the south.

According to the United States Census Bureau, the CDP has a total area of 5.0 square miles (13 km^{2}), all land.

== Demographics ==
Historical population
Census	Pop.	Note	%±
1990	11,627		—
2000	14,812		27.4%
2010	12,134		−18.1%
2020	12,907		6.4%

=== 2020 census ===
As of the 2020 census, New Kingman-Butler had a population of 12,907. The median age was 47.9 years. 19.6% of residents were under the age of 18 and 25.2% of residents were 65 years of age or older. For every 100 females there were 102.1 males, and for every 100 females age 18 and over there were 99.2 males age 18 and over.

98.8% of residents lived in urban areas, while 1.2% lived in rural areas.

There were 5,356 households in New Kingman-Butler, of which 22.6% had children under the age of 18 living in them. Of all households, 37.5% were married-couple households, 23.9% were households with a male householder and no spouse or partner present, and 28.0% were households with a female householder and no spouse or partner present. About 30.0% of all households were made up of individuals and 17.0% had someone living alone who was 65 years of age or older.

There were 6,068 housing units, of which 11.7% were vacant. The homeowner vacancy rate was 3.6% and the rental vacancy rate was 9.1%.

Racial composition as of the 2020 census
Race	Number	Percent
White	10,656	82.6%
Black or African American	133	1.0%
American Indian and Alaska Native	262	2.0%
Asian	122	0.9%
Native Hawaiian and Other Pacific Islander	42	0.3%
Some other race	569	4.4%
Two or more races	1,123	8.7%
Hispanic or Latino (of any race)	1,768	13.7%

=== 2000 census ===
As of the census of 2000, there were 14,812 people, 5,895 households, and 3,979 families residing in the CDP. The population density was 1,011.6 inhabitants per square mile (390.6/km^{2}). There were 6,630 housing units at an average density of 452.9 per square mile (174.9/km^{2}). The racial makeup of the CDP was 91.3% White, 0.4% Black or African American, 1.7% Native American, 0.4% Asian, 0.1% Pacific Islander, 3.0% from other races, and 3.1% from two or more races. 9.3% of the population were Hispanic or Latino of any race.

There were 5,895 households, out of which 27.9% had children under the age of 18 living with them, 49.9% were married couples living together, 12.1% had a female householder with no husband present, and 32.5% were non-families. 25.2% of all households were made up of individuals, and 12.6% had someone living alone who was 65 years of age or older. The average household size was 2.51 and the average family size was 2.96.

In the CDP, the population was spread out, with 25.7% under the age of 18, 7.7% from 18 to 24, 24.2% from 25 to 44, 23.2% from 45 to 64, and 19.2% who were 65 years of age or older. The median age was 40 years. For every 100 females, there were 95.4 males. For every 100 females age 18 and over, there were 94.0 males.

The median income for a household in the CDP was $25,917, and the median income for a family was $31,173. Males had a median income of $26,891 versus $20,194 for females. The per capita income for the CDP was $13,994. About 13.3% of families and 18.2% of the population were below the poverty line, including 23.4% of those under age 18 and 10.0% of those age 65 or over.

== Education ==
The CDP is in the Kingman Unified School District.
