= McConnico, Arizona =

- Census-designated place
- Location within Arizona Location within the United States
- Coordinates: 35°09′49″N 114°05′23″W
- Country: United States
- State: Arizona
- County: Mohave

Area
  - Total: 6.58 sq mi (17.05 km^{2})
  - Land: 6.58 sq mi (17.05 km^{2})
  - Water: 0 sq mi (0.00 km^{2})
- Elevation: 3,068 ft (935 m)

Population (2020)
  - Total: 63
  - Density: 9.6/sq mi (3.7/km^{2})
- Time zone: UTC-7 (MST)
- Area code: 928
- FIPS code: 04-43150
- GNIS feature ID: 2582819

McConnico is an unincorporated community and census-designated place (CDP) in Mohave County, Arizona, United States. The population was 63 at the 2020 census.

== Geography ==
McConnico is located in central Mohave County. It is bordered to the north by the city of Kingman, the Mohave county seat. It is bordered to the west by unincorporated Golden Valley. Interstate 40 passes through the CDP, with access from Exit 44 just to the south and from Exit 48 (Beale Street) to the north in Kingman. I-40 leads east 150 miles (240 km) to Flagstaff and west 57 miles (92 km) to Needles, California.

According to the United States Census Bureau, the CDP has a total area of 6.58 square miles (17.0 km^{2}), all land.

== Demographics ==
Historical population
Census	Pop.	Note	%±
2010	70		—
2020	63		−10.0%
U.S. Decennial Census

As of the 2010 census, there were 70 people living in the CDP: 43 male and 27 female. 13 were 19 years old or younger, 8 were ages 20–34, 11 were between the ages of 35 and 49, 25 were between 50 and 64, and the remaining 13 were aged 65 and above. The median age was 52.0 years.

The racial makeup of the CDP was 94.3% White, 2.9% American Indian, 1.4% Other, and 1.4% two or more races. 4.3% of the population were Hispanic or Latino of any race.

There were 36 households in the CDP, 14 family households (38.9%) and 22 non-family households (61.1%), with an average household size of 1.78. Of the family households, 4 were married couples living together, while 3 were single fathers and 7 were single mothers; the non-family households included 20 adults living alone: 15 male and 5 female.

The CDP contained 56 housing units, of which 36 were occupied and 20 were vacant.

== Education ==
The CDP is in the Kingman Unified School District.
