= Valle Vista, Arizona =

CDP in Mohave County, Arizona

- Census-designated place
- Location in Mohave County, Arizona

- Location within Arizona Location within the United States
- Coordinates: 35°24′39″N 113°51′46″W
- Country: United States
- State: Arizona
- County: Mohave

Area
  - Total: 11.96 sq mi (30.97 km^{2})
  - Land: 11.96 sq mi (30.97 km^{2})
  - Water: 0 sq mi (0.00 km^{2})
- Elevation: 3,173 ft (967 m)

Population (2020)
  - Total: 1,802
  - Density: 150.7/sq mi (58.19/km^{2})
- Time zone: UTC-7 (MST (no DST))
- ZIP code: 86401
- Area code: 928
- FIPS code: 04-78865
- GNIS feature ID: 2582889

Valle Vista is an unincorporated community and census-designated place (CDP) in Mohave County, in the U.S. state of Arizona. The population was 1,802 at the 2020 census.

== Geography ==
The community is in central Mohave County, 18 miles (29 km) northeast of Kingman, the county seat. It is on the north side of Arizona State Route 66, former U.S. Route 66. It also has a golf course and a community park.

== Demographics ==
Historical population
Census	Pop.	Note	%±
2010	1,659		—
2020	1,802		8.6%
U.S. Decennial Census

=== 2020 census ===
As of the 2020 census, Valle Vista had a population of 1,802. The median age was 64.0 years. 9.2% of residents were under the age of 18 and 46.9% of residents were 65 years of age or older. For every 100 females there were 103.6 males, and for every 100 females age 18 and over there were 106.2 males age 18 and over.

0.0% of residents lived in urban areas, while 100.0% lived in rural areas.

There were 884 households in Valle Vista, of which 9.3% had children under the age of 18 living in them. Of all households, 56.9% were married-couple households, 20.1% were households with a male householder and no spouse or partner present, and 17.3% were households with a female householder and no spouse or partner present. About 30.0% of all households were made up of individuals and 18.8% had someone living alone who was 65 years of age or older.

There were 983 housing units, of which 10.1% were vacant. The homeowner vacancy rate was 2.1% and the rental vacancy rate was 7.5%.

Racial composition as of the 2020 census
Race	Number	Percent
White	1,617	89.7%
Black or African American	11	0.6%
American Indian and Alaska Native	37	2.1%
Asian	12	0.7%
Native Hawaiian and Other Pacific Islander	0	0.0%
Some other race	14	0.8%
Two or more races	111	6.2%
Hispanic or Latino (of any race)	87	4.8%

== Education ==
The CDP is in the Kingman Unified School District.
