= Meadview, Arizona =

Unincorporated community in Mohave County, Arizona, US

- Census-designated place
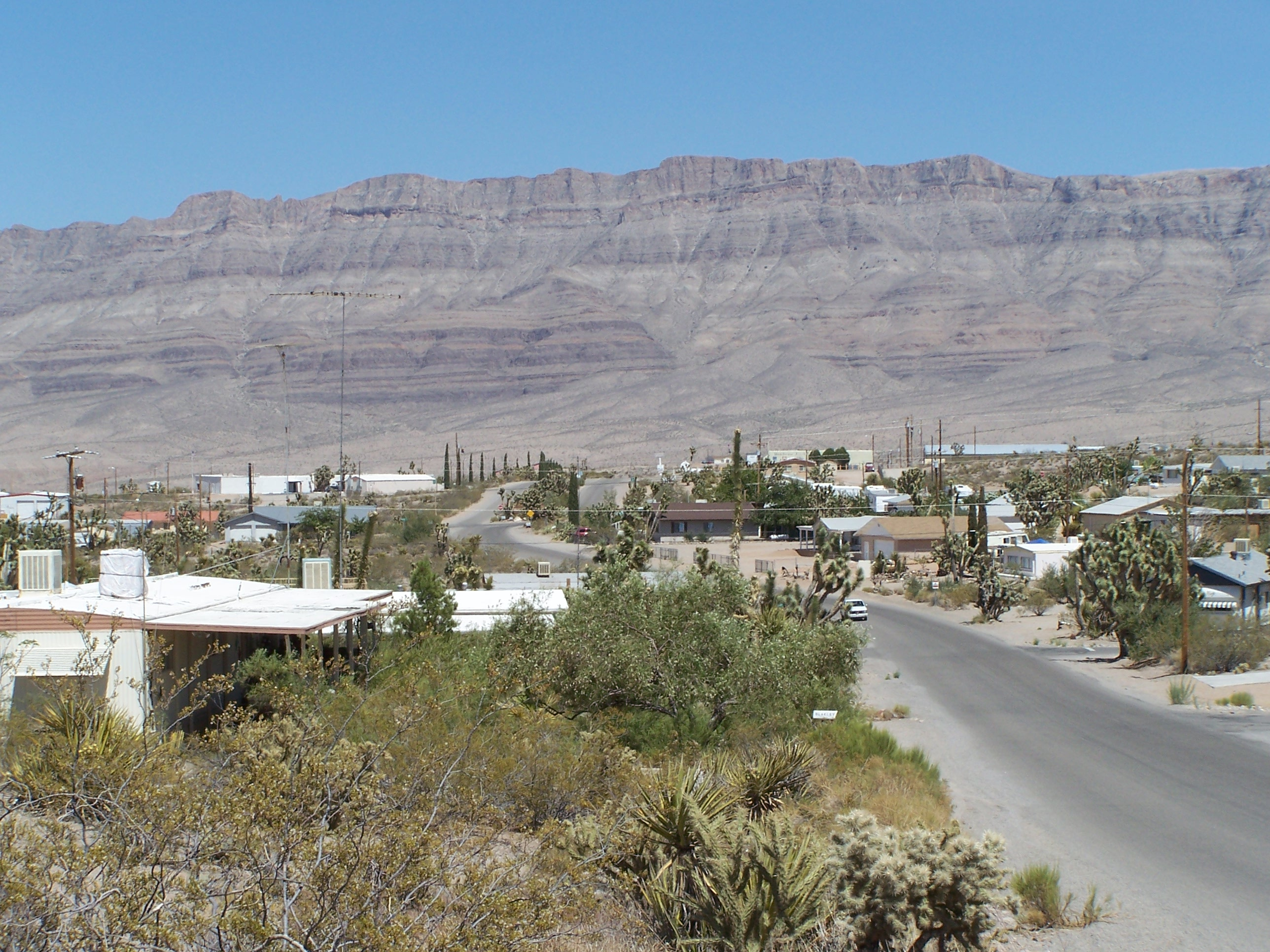
- Meadview looking east to Grand Wash Cliffs
- Motto(s): "In Hardship, Always United"
- Location in Mohave County, Arizona

- Location within Arizona Location within the United States
- Coordinates: 35°59′08″N 114°04′16″W
- Country: United States
- State: Arizona
- County: Mohave

Area
  - Total: 31.04 sq mi (80.39 km^{2})
  - Land: 31.04 sq mi (80.39 km^{2})
  - Water: 0 sq mi (0.00 km^{2})
- Elevation: 3,343 ft (1,019 m)

Population (2020)
  - Total: 1,420
  - Density: 45.7/sq mi (17.66/km^{2})
- Time zone: UTC−7 (MST (no DST))
- ZIP code: 86444
- Area code: 928
- FIPS code: 04-45285
- GNIS feature ID: 2582824

Meadview is an unincorporated community and census-designated place (CDP) in Mohave County, Arizona, United States, located near Lake Mead. As of the 2020 census, Meadview had 1,420 residents, up from 1,224 as of 2010. It was founded in the 1960s as a retirement community and is still largely one, as well as a vacation spot for people coming to enjoy Lake Mead.

== Geography ==
Meadview is located in northern Mohave County. It is 67 miles (108 km) north of Kingman, the county seat, via Pierce Ferry Road. From the road it is possible to see Lake Mead to the west, 3 miles (5 km) distant. Road access to the lake is 11 miles (18 km) to the north. Pearce Ferry on the Colorado River, at the west end of the Grand Canyon, is 14 miles (23 km) north of Meadview.

According to the United States Census Bureau, the Meadview CDP has an area of 31.0 square miles (80 km^{2}), all land.

=== Climate ===
According to the Köppen Climate Classification system, Meadview has a hot desert climate, abbreviated "BWk" on climate maps.

Climate data for Climate Meadview – Arizona, 1981–2010.
Month	Jan	Feb	Mar	Apr	May	Jun	Jul	Aug	Sep	Oct	Nov	Dec	Year
Mean daily maximum °F (°C)	56 (13)	59 (15)	67 (19)	77 (25)	87 (31)	98 (37)	102 (39)	100 (38)	93 (34)	79 (26)	65 (18)	55 (13)	78 (26)
Mean daily minimum °F (°C)	33 (1)	36 (2)	41 (5)	49 (9)	60 (16)	70 (21)	76 (24)	74 (23)	65 (18)	52 (11)	41 (5)	33 (1)	53 (11)
Source: US Climate Data

== Demographics ==
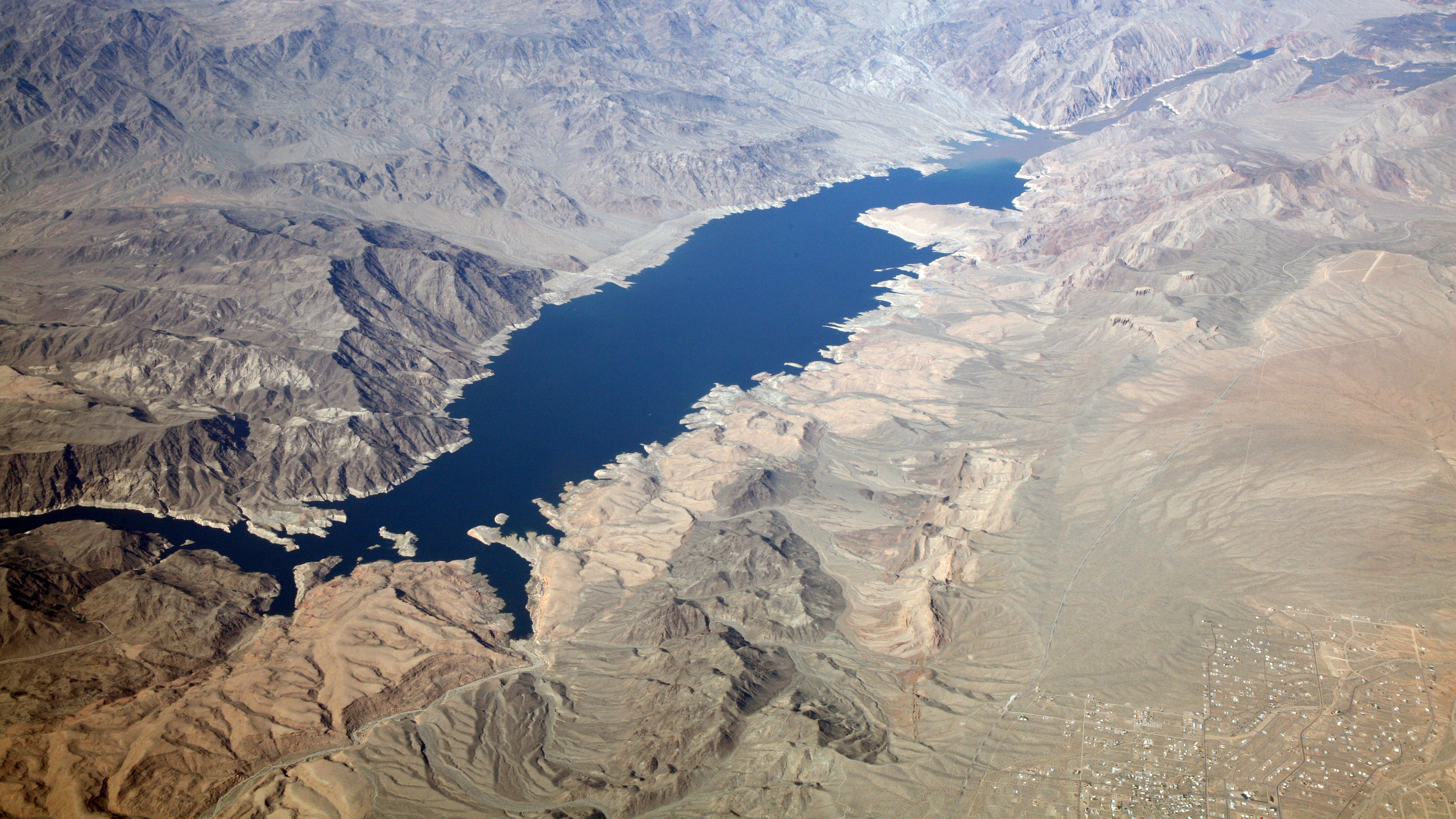
Meadview at lower right, Virgin Canyon and upper Lake Mead above (2012)

Historical population
Census	Pop.	Note	%±
2000	821		—
2010	1,224		49.1%
2020	1,420		16.0%
U.S. Decennial Census

=== Racial and ethnic composition ===
Meadview CDP, Arizona – Racial composition Note: the US Census treats Hispanic/Latino as an ethnic category. This table excludes Latinos from the racial categories and assigns them to a separate category. Hispanics/Latinos may be of any race.
Race (NH = Non-Hispanic)	% 2020	% 2010	Pop 2020	Pop 2010
White alone (NH)	88.9%	90.4%	1,263	1,106
Black alone (NH)	0.5%	0.7%	7	8
American Indian alone (NH)	0.8%	1.1%	12	13
Asian alone (NH)	0.6%	1%	9	12
Pacific Islander alone (NH)	0.1%	0.1%	1	1
Other race alone (NH)	0%	0.1%	0	1
Multiracial (NH)	2.7%	1.9%	38	23
Hispanic/Latino (any race)	6.3%	4.9%	90	60

=== 2020 census ===
As of the 2020 census, Meadview had a population of 1,420. The median age was 64.7 years. 4.4% of residents were under the age of 18 and 49.1% of residents were 65 years of age or older. For every 100 females there were 121.9 males, and for every 100 females age 18 and over there were 120.1 males age 18 and over.

0.0% of residents lived in urban areas, while 100.0% lived in rural areas.

There were 775 households in Meadview, of which 7.0% had children under the age of 18 living in them. Of all households, 48.4% were married-couple households, 28.5% were households with a male householder and no spouse or partner present, and 15.7% were households with a female householder and no spouse or partner present. About 31.6% of all households were made up of individuals and 21.3% had someone living alone who was 65 years of age or older.

There were 1,257 housing units, of which 38.3% were vacant. The homeowner vacancy rate was 5.6% and the rental vacancy rate was 11.0%.

=== 2010 census ===
As of the 2010 census, the racial composition of Meadview was as follows:

- White: 92.8% (Non-Hispanic Whites: 95.5%; Hispanic Whites: 4.9%)
- Black or African American: 0.7%
- Asian: 1.0%
- Two or more races: 2.2%
- Native American: 1.3%
- Native Hawaiian and Other Pacific Islander: 0.1%

== Media ==
Meadview is the community of license for five broadcast translator television stations and one translator radio station. The TV stations rebroadcast Phoenix stations, and are owned by Mohave County. The radio station is privately owned and rebroadcasts a radio station from Redding, California via satellite. Meadview is also within range of the major television and radio stations from Las Vegas, Nevada.

Broadcast media licensed to Meadview:

- K23DK – translator of KPNX 12 Phoenix (NBC)
- K25DH – translator of KTVK-TV 3 Phoenix (Ind)
- K36FZ – translator of KAET 8 Phoenix (PBS)
- K38GR – translator of KNXV-TV 15 Phoenix (ABC)
- K47HE – translator of KPHO-TV 5 Phoenix (CBS)
- K215DJ 90.9 – translator of KVIP-FM 98.1 Redding CA (Contemporary Christian)
- KCYE 107.9 – country station serving Las Vegas, licensed to Meadview.

== Education ==
The CDP is in the Kingman Unified School District.
