= Yellow Knolls =

Landform in Mohave County, Arizona

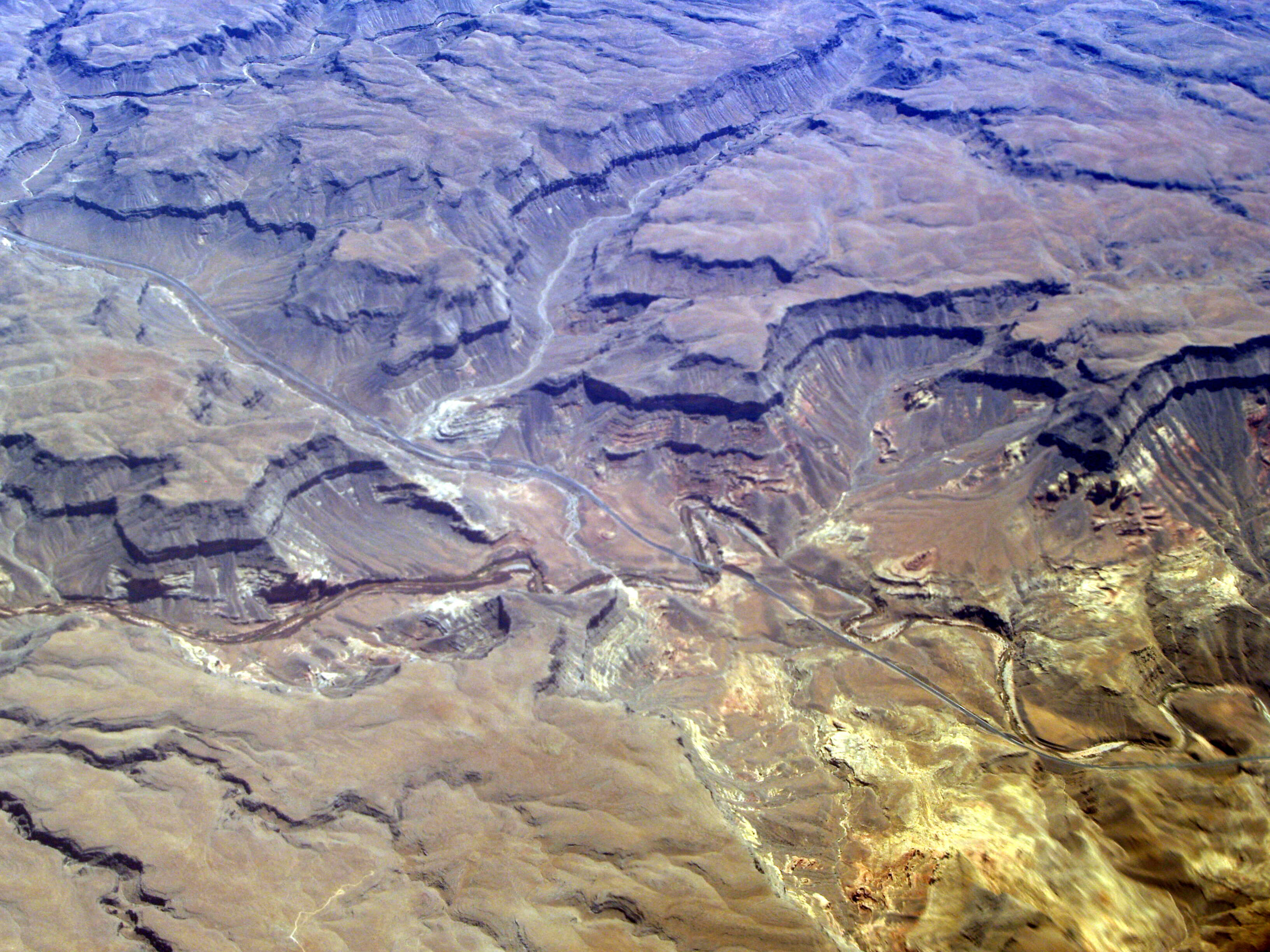
- Yellow Knolls, in Virgin River Gorge, & Interstate 15 (southeast view)

Highest point
- Elevation: 2,668 ft (813 m)
- Parent peak: Jarvis Peak, (south section)-Beaver Dam Mountains
- Coordinates: 36°58′34″N 113°44′30″W

Geography
- Location within Arizona
- Location: Mohave Coynty, Arizona, U.S.
- Parent range: Beaver Dam Mountains, (south section)
- Topo map: USGS Purgatory Canyon

Climbing
- Easiest route: Interstate 15 in Arizona

Yellow Knolls, of Arizona, is a prominence in the Virgin River Gorge's east end, located in Mohave County, part of the Arizona Strip of northwest Arizona. Yellow Knolls is located on the north side of Interstate 15, and is also in the south of the Beaver Dam Mountains Wilderness.

The knolls are located where the Virgin River enters Arizona from southwest Utah; the Virgin River is a due-southwest trending circuitous stretch, as it descends from higher elevations at the southwest of the Colorado Plateau, specifically the High Plateaus Section, a transition region to the lower elevation Great Basin that lies west, northwest; the lower elevation region is also at an intersection point with the northeast perimeter region of the Mojave Desert. After a short stretch in Nevada, the Virgin River turns south in the Overton Arm of Lake Mead.

Yellow Knolls is approximately 15-mi northeast of Littlefield-Beaver Dam, Arizona in the northeast of the Virgin Valley, and about 20-mi southwest of St. George, Utah.

The Yellow Knolls section is bordered on the west by a due-south flowing stretch of Cedar Pockets Wash, which arises on the southeast of Jarvis Peak, 6,530 feet (1,990 m), (the highpoint of the south Beaver Dam Mountains section). The Yellow Knolls section is about 4-mi wide, and Yellow Knolls prominence, 2,668 feet (813 m), is located at the southeast, adjacent the river and gorge, as the river descends from the northeast from Utah.

An aerial photo (shown above) shows the Virgin River meanders, and are easily identifiable on maps. The section shows the Arizona-Utah border; the canyon coming from the south is Black Rock Canyon, arising from Mustang Knoll highpoint, 6,101 feet (1,860 m), a lower mountain section east of the Paiute Wilderness, located in the northeast end of the Virgin Mountains.

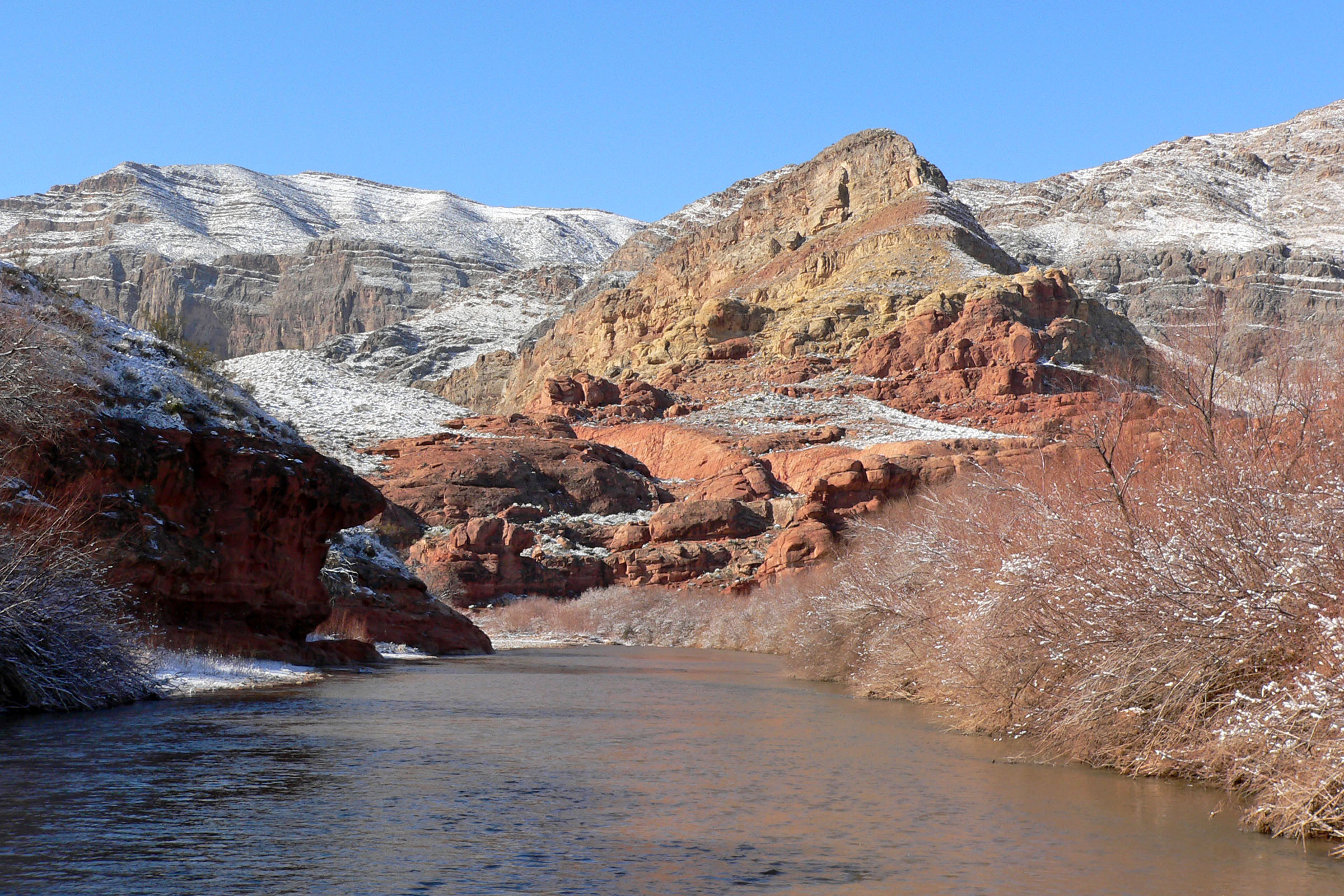
View at Cedar Pockets Wash region, Virgin River
