= Virgin Valley =

Valley in Clark County, Nevada and Mohave County, Arizona

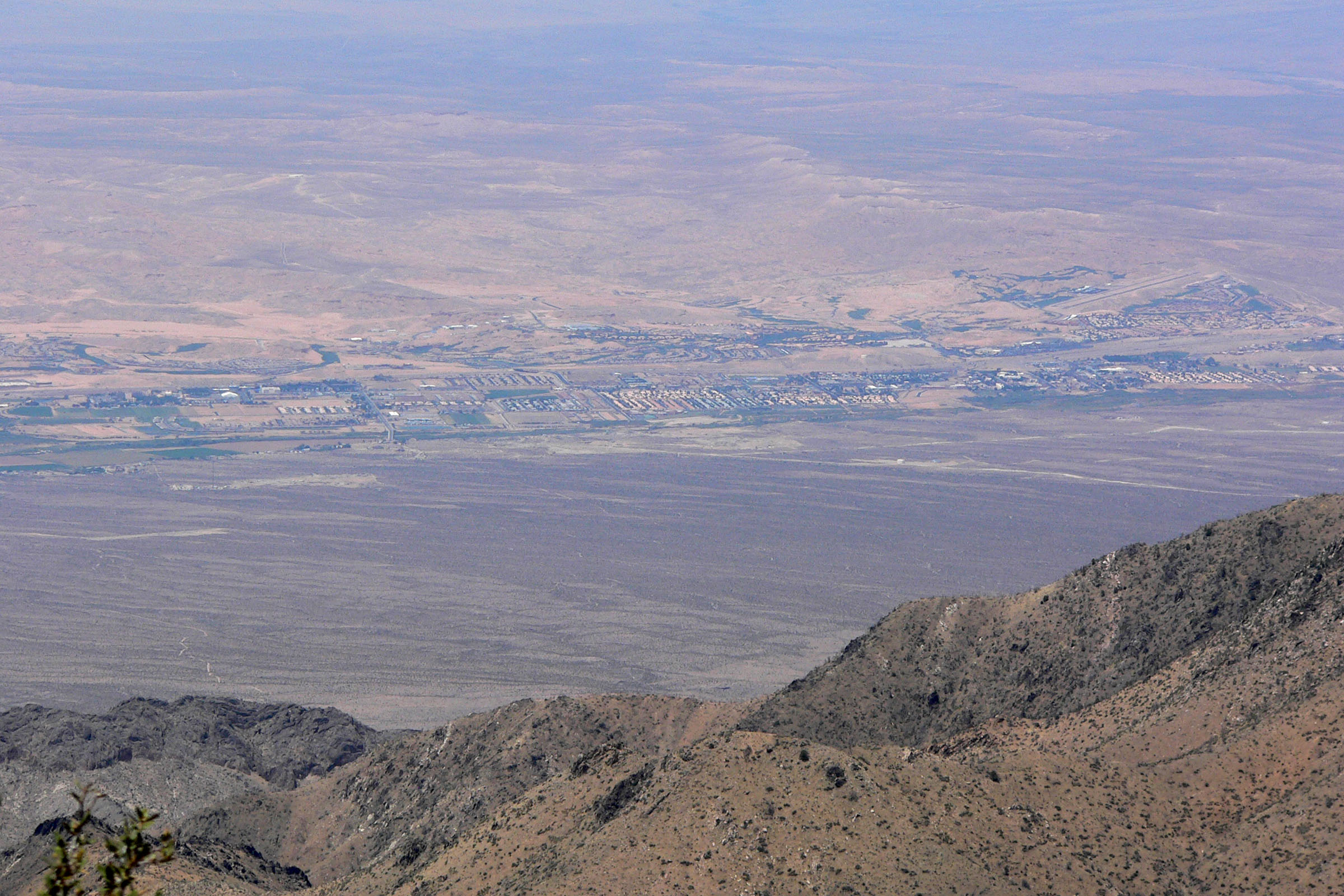
- view of Mesquite, NV from Virgin Peak, (center of valley)

- Location within Arizona
- Length: 25 miles (40 km)
- Width: 12 miles (19 km)

Geography
- Location: United States, Nevada/Arizona
- Population centers: Littlefield, AZ, Mesquite, NV
- Borders on: Beaver Dam Mountains & Wilderness-NE; Virgin Mountains-E & S Mormon Mesa-SW
- Coordinates: 36°48′9″N 114°4′56″W
- Rivers: Virgin River
- Interactive map of Virgin Valley

The Virgin Valley is a valley in northwest Arizona and southeast Nevada on the Virgin River. The Virgin River drains southwest Utah and southeast Nevada; parts of Arizona, especially the Arizona Strip region drain southwards into the Virgin River and Valley.

The Virgin Valley begins as the Virgin River exits the Virgin River Gorge between the Beaver Dam Mountains and Wilderness north, and the northeast of the Virgin Mountains on the south of the Gorge.

Lake Mead on the Virgin River extends slightly upstream into the Virgin Valley.

== History ==
There are two Virgin Valleys in Nevada. This article is mostly about the Southern valley, which is Northeast of Las Vegas along I-15. The Northern valley is on the opposite end of the State near the Oregon border. The two valleys are approximately 600 miles apart. The Opal mines are located in the Northern valley.

The Virgin Valley has mines that are rich in opals. The opals were discovered in about 1913. The richest mines were owned by Flora Haines Loughead who had been a writer and a farmer but bought a string of claims after being sent to do a story for the San Francisco Chronicle. She became known as the "Opal Queen" owning the Rainbow, Stonetree and Bonanza mines and the "Giant Tree" Opal Claim. She sold the latter in about 1918 and concentrated on the Rainbow and Bonanza mines.

== Description ==
The Virgin Valley is about 25 miles (40 km) long. Upstream in the valley's northeast, Littlefield, AZ is located at the exit of the Virgin River Gorge, as well as two outfalls from two washes that flow south from the Beaver Dam Mountains. Mesquite, NV is downstream, and on Interstate 15 in Nevada, about 10 miles (16 km). Mesquite is the approximate center of the valley.

The South Virgin Mountains are southeast of the Virgin Valley and Mountains, and separate the northern Overton Arm of Lake Mead from the Colorado River arm. The area north of the South Virgin Mountains is the Mormon Mesa, the southwest border of Virgin Valley. Mormon Mesa is an extension south from the Mormon Mountains which are separated east from the Meadow Valley Wash tributary to north Lake Mead.

The Virgin Valley is vertically bisected, north-south by the Nevada-Arizona border. The downstream Nevada half of the valley has the very beginnings of Lake Mead, about 20 miles (32 km) upstream, where the Virgin River used to flow.

Littlefield, AZ in the valley's northeast is located at 36°54′0″N 113°56′0″W. Mesquite, NV in the valley's center is located at 36°48′9″N 114°4′56″W.

== Gallery ==
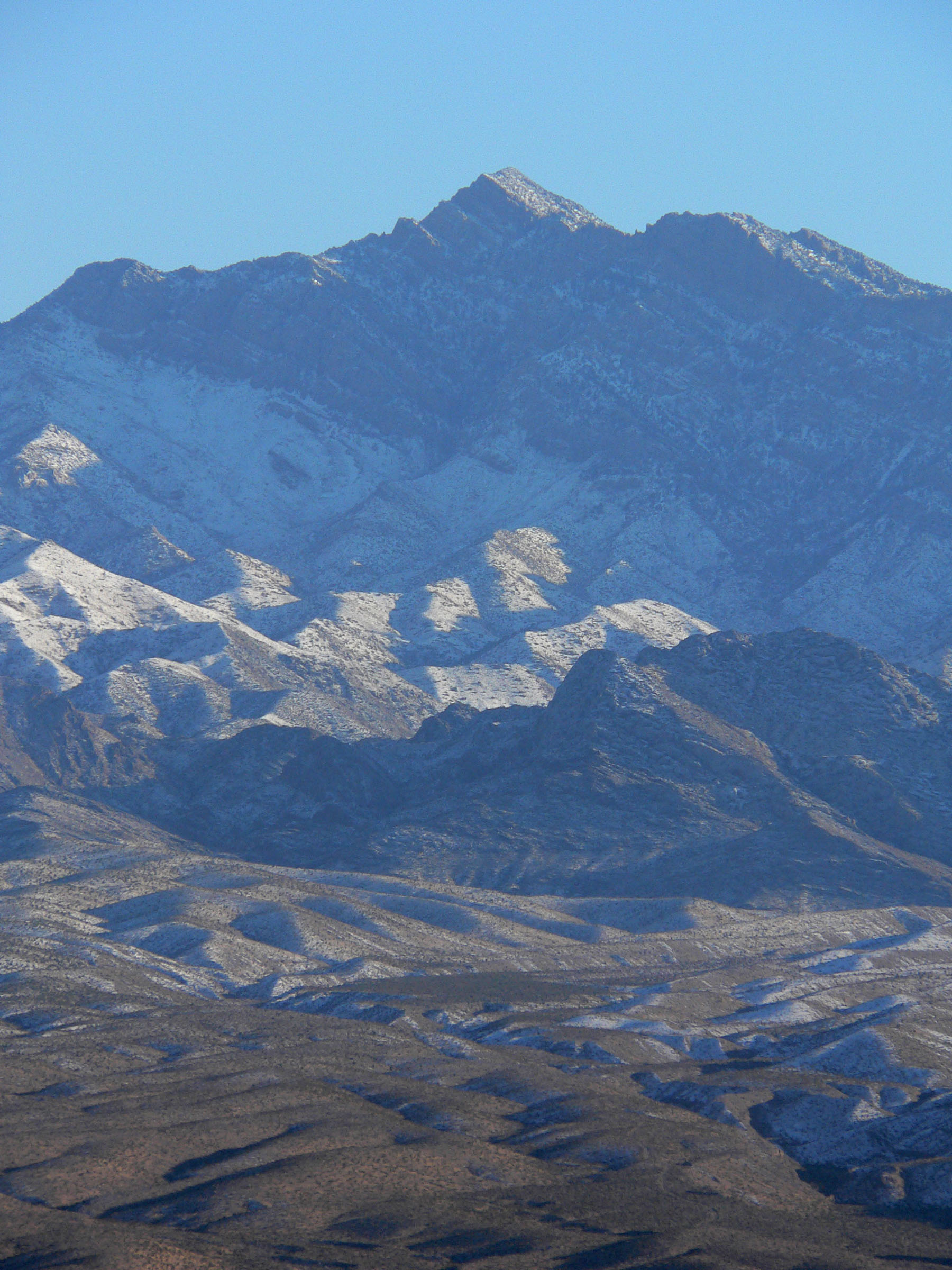
Virgin Peak, southwest Virgin Mountains from Virgin Valley, south of Mesquite

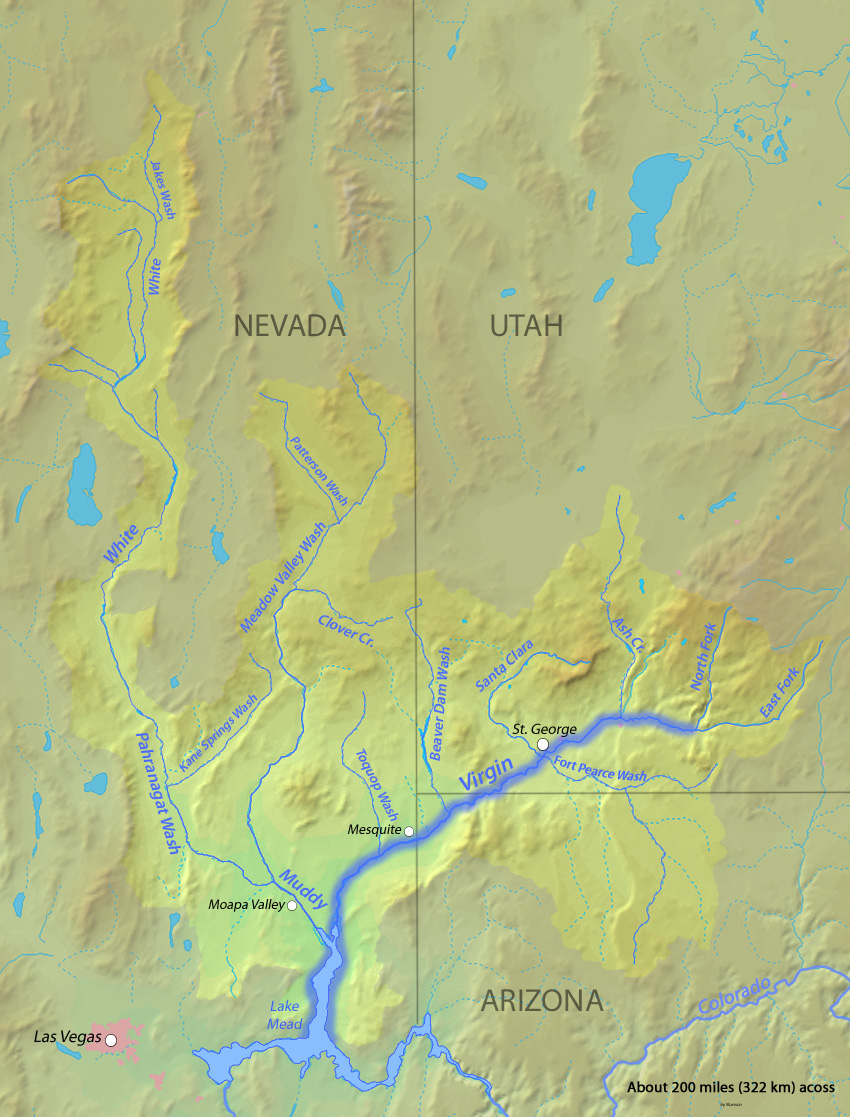
watershed

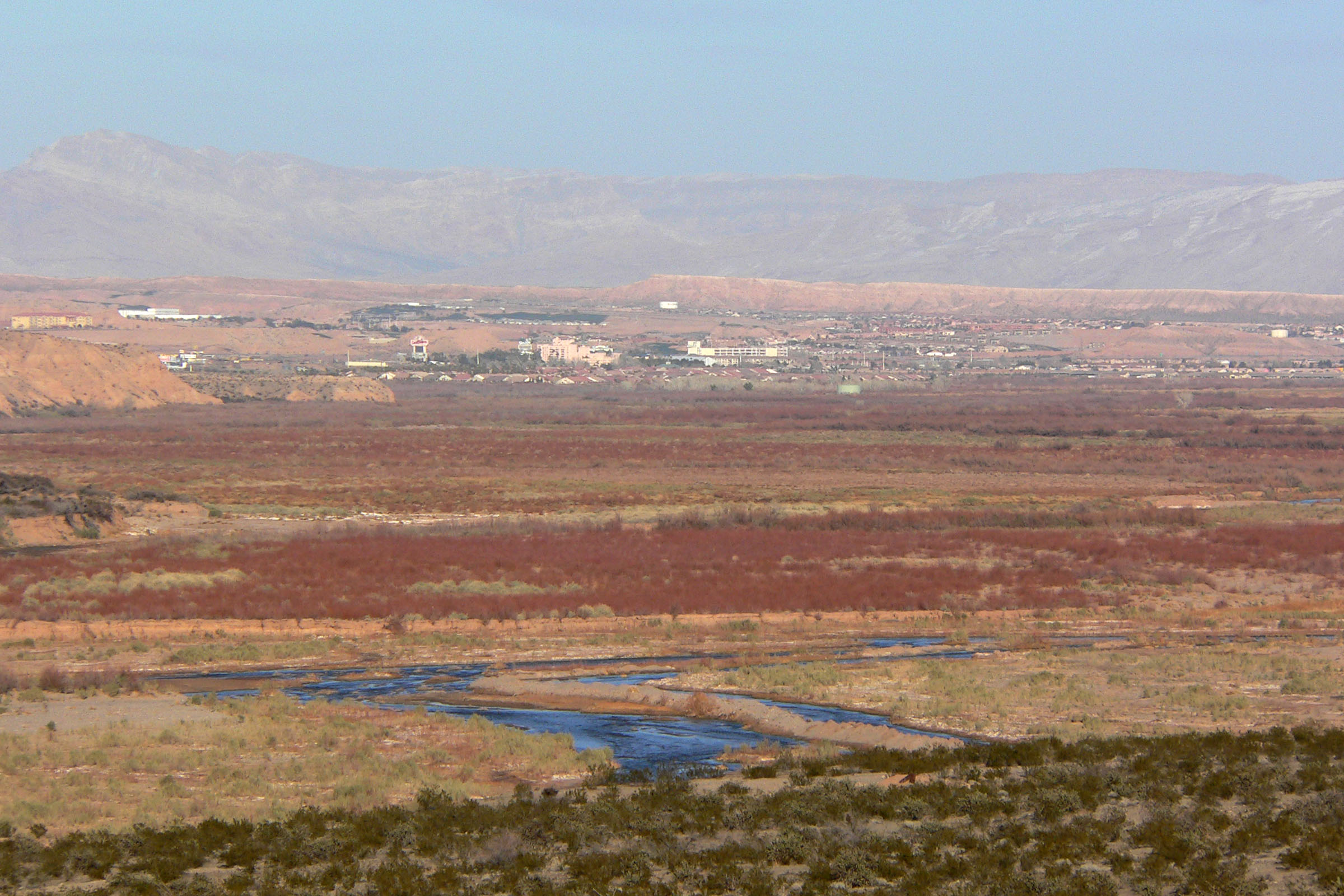
valley downstream of Mesquite
