= South Virgin Mountains =

Mountain range in Nevada, United States

- Location within Nevada

Highest point
- Elevation: 1,189 m (3,901 ft)

Geography
- Country: United States
- State: Nevada
- District: Clark County
- Range coordinates: 36°15′24.939″N 114°11′52.882″W
- Topo map: USGS Gold Butte

The South Virgin Mountains are a smaller mountain range of the eastern Mojave Desert, in Clark County, southeastern Nevada.

The mountains are located south of the larger Virgin Mountains range, east of the Virgin River leg of Lake Mead, and west of the Arizona Strip.

The South Virgin Mountains are within the jurisdiction of the BLM—Bureau of Land Management.

== Mountains ==
Black Butte is a summit northeast of Bitter Ridge, with an elevation of 2,690 feet (820 meters).

== See also ==
- Virgin Mountains
- Lake Mead National Recreation Area
- Virgin River Gorge
- Virgin River Narrows
