= Beaver Dam High School =

Beaver Dam High School may refer to:

- Beaver Dam High School (Arizona), Beaver Dam, Arizona
- Beaver Dam High School (Indiana), Akron, Indiana
- Beaver Dam High School (Kentucky), Beaver Dam, Kentucky
- Beaver Dam High School (Wisconsin), Beaver Dam, Wisconsin
