= BDHS =

BDHS may refer to:

- Beaver Dam High School (Beaver Dam, Arizona), United States
- Beaver Dam High School (Wisconsin), Beaver Dam, Wisconsin, United States
- Ben Davis High School, Indianapolis, Indiana, United States
- Bishop Dubois High School, New York, New York, United States
- Bishop Dwenger High School, Fort Wayne, Indiana, United States
- Bradford District High School, Bradford, Ontario, Canada
- Brentsville District High School, Prince William County, Virginia, United States
