= Arvada (disambiguation) =

Arvada, Colorado is the seventh-most-populous city in Colorado.

Arvada may also refer to:

- Arvada, Wyoming, an unincorporated community in the US
- Arvada, Arizona, an unincorporated community that shares a post office with Scenic, Arizona, US
