= Black Rock, Arizona =

Locale in Arizona, United States

Coordinates: 36°58′45″N 113°38′40″W

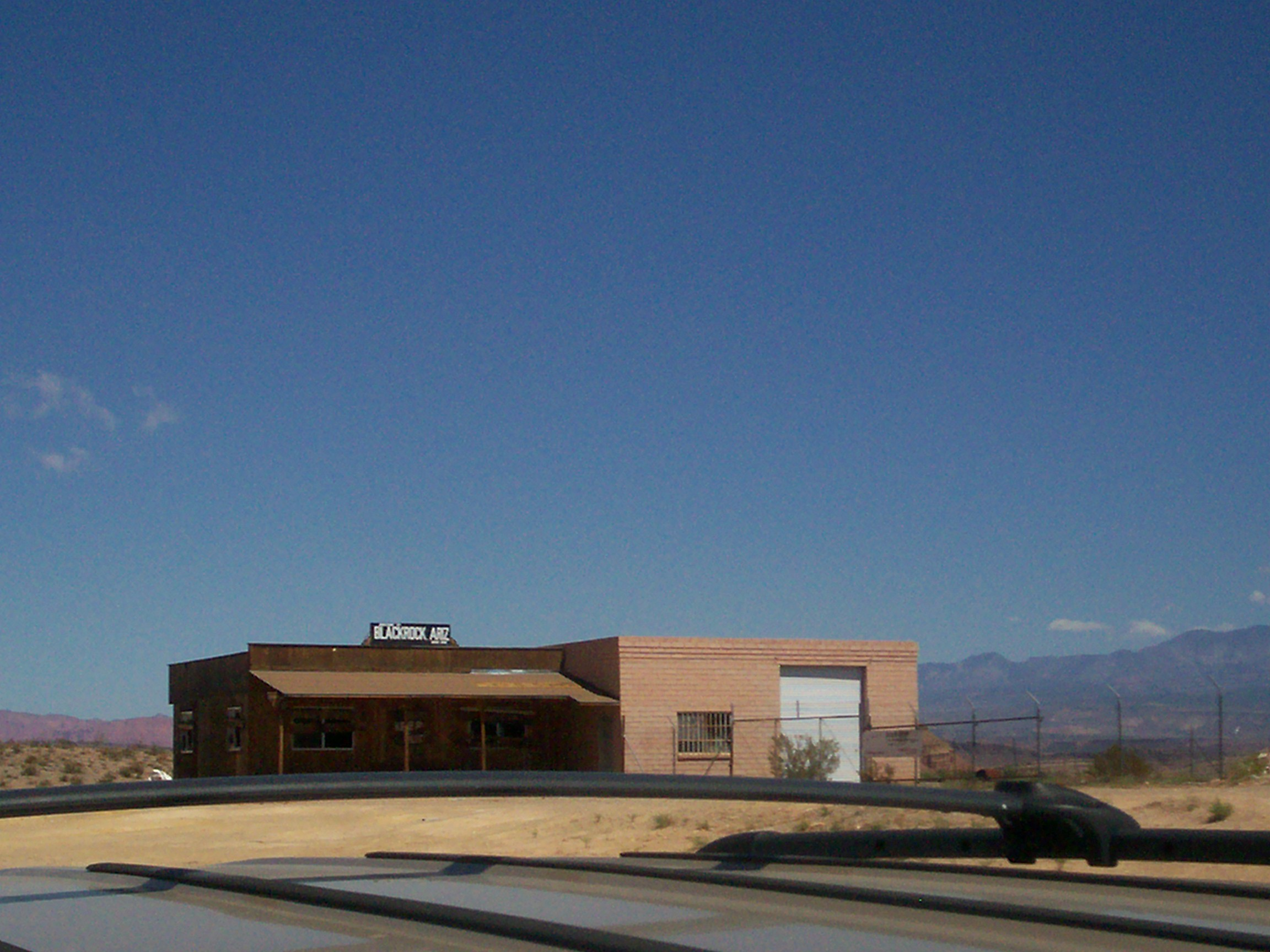
Abandoned building in Black Rock, Arizona.

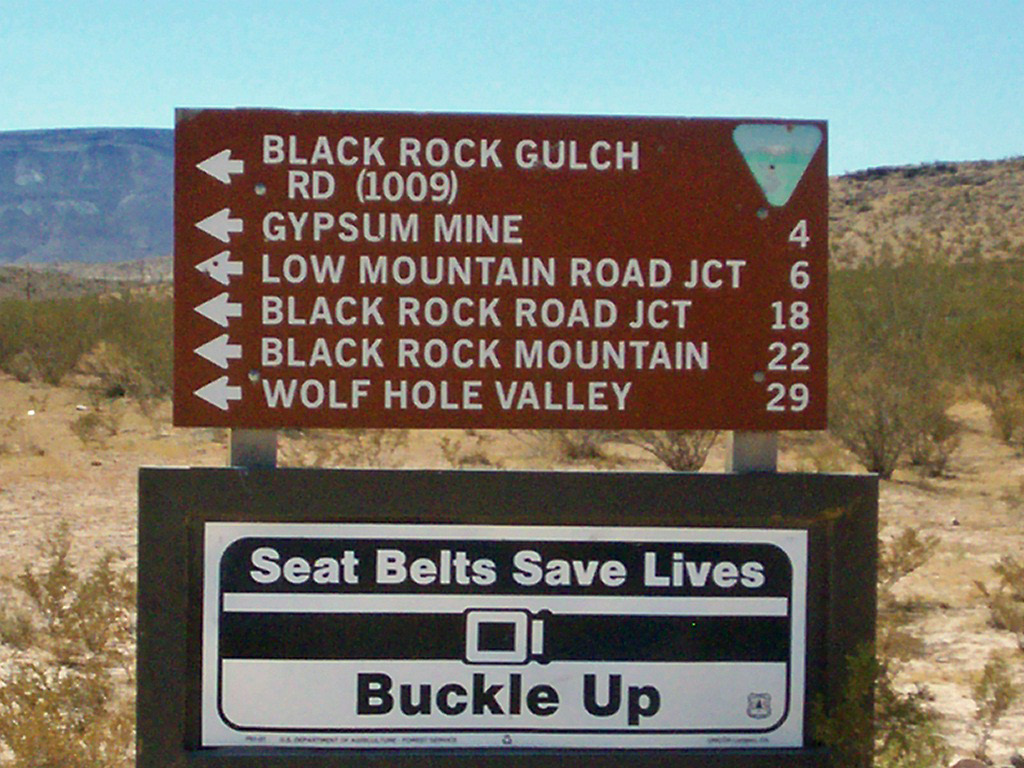
Bureau of Land Management direction sign to recreation sites at Black Rock, AZ.

Black Rock, Arizona is located just south of the Utah–Arizona state line in the extreme northwest part of the state. It is an area of the Arizona Strip in the northern Mojave Desert near Interstate 15. The area is accessible via the Black Rock Road Exit just outside the Virgin River Gorge, which lies to the south. The United States Bureau of Land Management oversees the area, which is used for off road vehicle recreation, hiking, photography, and as an informal rest stop for long-haul truckers. In 1955, the film *Bad Day At Black Rock* was released.
