= List of exits on Interstate 15 =

The Interstate 15 exit list has been divided by state:

- Interstate 15 in California#Exit list
- Interstate 15 in Nevada#Exit list
- Interstate 15 in Arizona#Exit list
- Interstate 15 in Utah#Exit list
- Interstate 15 in Idaho#Exit list
- Interstate 15 in Montana#Exit list
