= Virgin Valley High School =

Location
- 820 Valley View Drive; Mesquite, Nevada 89027; United States; 36.81397°N 114.0514°W

Information
- School type: Public high school
- Established: 1911
- School district: Clark County School District
- Principal: Mike Wilson
- Teaching staff: 36.00 (FTE)
- Grades: 9-12
- Enrollment: 780 (2023-2024)
- Student to teacher ratio: 21.67
- Color: Green/White
- Mascot: Bulldog
- Website: Virgin Valley High School

Virgin Valley High School is a high school in Mesquite, Nevada under the jurisdiction of the Clark County School District. Up until the opening of Beaver Dam High School in Beaver Dam, Arizona in the fall of 2004, high school students from the Littlefield Unified School District across the Arizona state line attended high school at Virgin Valley.

== Notable alumni ==
- Cresent Hardy — Nevada Assemblyman
- Jerry Montgomery — American football coach
