= Virgin Mountains =

Mountain range in Nevada, United States

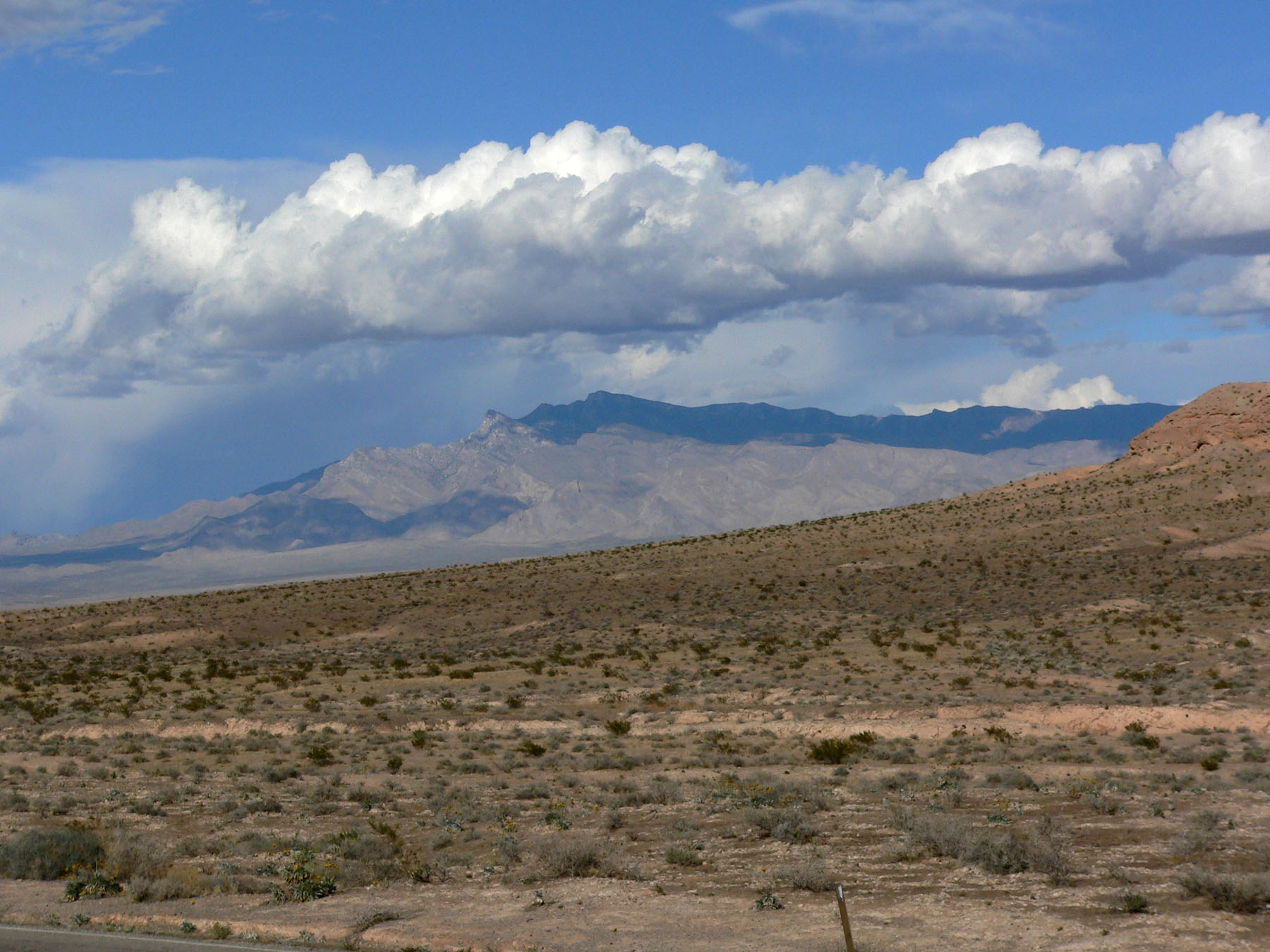
- Virgin Mountains seen from the Northshore Drive along Lake Mead

Highest point
- Peak: Virgin Peak
- Elevation: 7,946 ft (2,422 m)
- Coordinates: 36°36′10″N 114°06′42″W

Dimensions
- Area: 116 mi^{2} (300 km^{2})

Geography
- Country: United States
- States: Nevada; Arizona

The Virgin Mountains are a mountain range of the northeastern Mojave Desert, located in Clark County, southeastern Nevada and Mohave County, northwestern Arizona.

== Geography ==
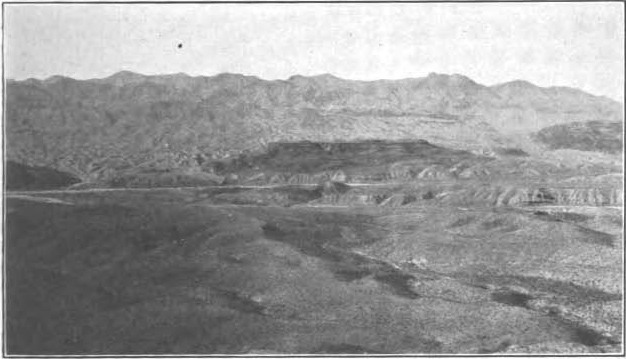
Historical (1928) photo of the southern Virgin Mountains and Grand Wash

Virgin Peak, at 7,946 feet (2,422 m) in elevation, is the highest point in the range. The range is northeast of Lake Mead, and around 15 miles (24 km) south of the Nevada town of Mesquite.

Hydrologically, the range is located in the Lower Colorado—Lake Mead watershed. (USGS Huc 1501),

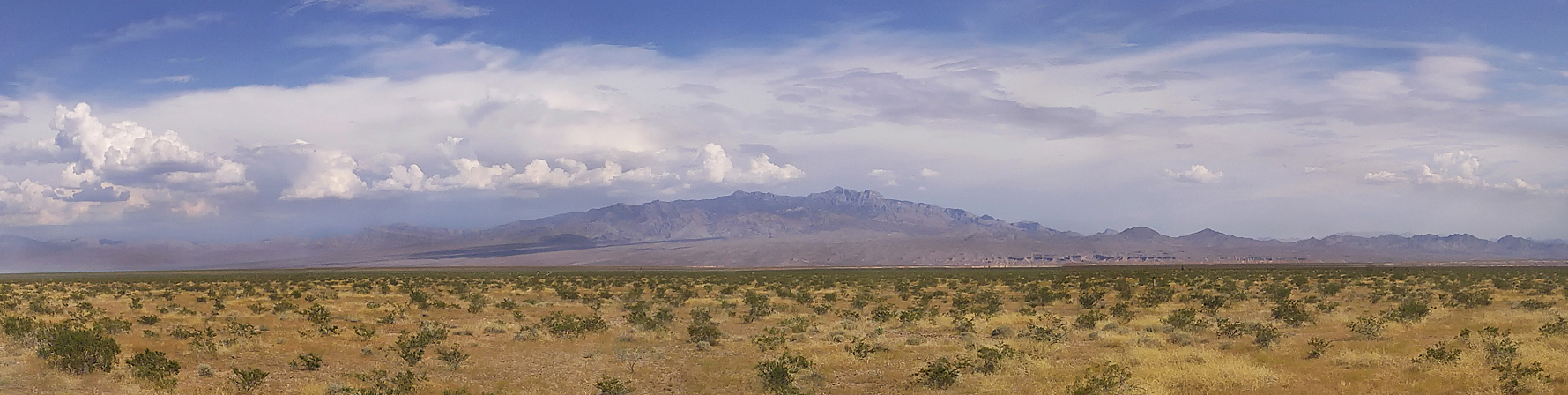
Virgin Range Panorama (Southeast)

91.6% of the range is managed by the Bureau of Land Management, with a section of the Virgin Peak area designated within the BLM Virgin Mountain Natural Area.

== Natural history ==
The range has many species of lizards, as well as the Panamint rattlesnake and glossy snake. Trees found in the range include Single-leaf pinyon pine (Pinus monophylla), Arizona cypress (Cupressus arizonica), White fir (Abies concolor), Douglas fir (Pseudotsuga menziesii), and Utah juniper (Juniperus osteosperma), and Rocky Mountain juniper (Juniperus scopulorum). The range has one endemic species of stick insect, Timema nevadense.

== See also ==
- Virgin Valley
- Virgin River
- Virgin River Gorge
- Virgin River Narrows
- South Virgin Mountains
