= Littlefield Unified School District =

School district in northwestern Arizona, United States

Littlefield Unified School District No. 9

Location
- 3490 E. Rio Virgin Road; Beaver Dam, AZ 86432

District information
- Type: Public
- Established: 1910
- Superintendent: Troy Heaton

Other information
- Website: www.lusd9.com

Littlefield Unified School District is a PK-12 grade school district headquartered in Beaver Dam, Arizona.

Littlefield Unified's District covers a large geographical area in Mohave County, located in the extreme northwest corner of the state. The school district serves the census-designated places of Beaver Dam, Desert Springs, Littlefield, and Scenic, including Arvada. It has a population of roughly 340 students throughout elementary, junior high and high school. Mount Trumbull and the rebuilt schoolhouse are part of the school district.

== History ==
The history of Littlefield School District #9 dates back to the early 1900s when a few families in the farming communities of Littlefield and Beaver Dam were holding school in their homes. An adobe building was constructed several hundred feet above the Virgin River in Littlefield, and formal education commenced there sometime around 1910.

The 1926–1927 school year exhibited a tremendous group of students attending the one-room school in Littlefield. The average daily attendance was 13 students.

Not much changed for the next 60 years within the district.

There were years during the late 1970s and early 1980s when only one or two students were enrolled at the school. Growth began in the district in the later part of the 1980s. The one-room schoolhouse soon had several modular buildings dotting the property's perimeter. By 1992 enrollment at the school approached 100 students.

Throughout the 20th century, all Littlefield School students were taught until 5th or 8th grade. Students then proceeded to Virgin Valley High School in Mesquite, Nevada, where they were able to participate in programs and graduate from an accredited institution. A Certificate of Educational Convenience (CEC) was approved by the County Superintendent, authorizing the district to use Arizona funds for the tuition of students attending Virgin Valley High School. Littlefield Middle School was established in the 1991-92 school year, and students in grades 6-8 no longer traveled to Mesquite for further education.

With enrollment steadily climbing, the Governing Board of the District enlisted the assistance of the newly established Arizona School Facilities Board to assist in the construction of a new school across the Interstate 15 freeway, and in 1997, then-Arizona Governor Fife Symington arrived at the Littlefield School with a $3 million check to the district. In 1999, Beaver Dam School opened, and a new era began. The Littlefield site was abandoned as students in grades K-8 moved into the new building. It was temporarily used again in the 2000–2001 school year due to increased elementary enrollment, and students were bussed to the newer school for lunch.

Unprecedented student and community growth continued, prompting discussion among the board regarding the prospect of a new high school in Beaver Dam. It was soon determined to build the school, slated for opening in 2003. Students who would be graduating from Beaver Dam High School in 2006 remained at the elementary school during their freshman year. All subsequent students would also attend the entirety of their elementary and secondary education within the district.

In 2002, an eight-classroom addition was added to the Beaver Dam Elementary School to accommodate continued growth and provide space for the additional secondary students. Two modular buildings were brought from the Littlefield site to Beaver Dam, where they were remodeled. This provided four additional classrooms to be utilized by the middle school and high school students.

Beaver Dam High School opened its doors in the fall of 2004. Two additional modular buildings were added to the middle school campus over the next few years, including a sports court and locker room facility.

An additional wing was constructed at the high school in 2008, including a media center, commons area, and six classrooms. The community passed A capital improvement bond shortly after that, facilitating the construction of the vocational facility, stage, and visiting team locker rooms. Athletic fields and landscaping were also completed at this time.

The elementary and junior/senior high schools are all within walking distance of each other in Beaver Dam.

Troy Heaton joined LUSD in July 2023 as the Principal of Beaver Dam Jr./Sr. High School and District Superintendent. Lael Calton is the Principal of Beaver Dam Elementary, since July 2026.

== Governing Board of Education ==
Governing Board Members	Term
Mr. Mark Cobb	January 2023 – December 2026
Mr. Michael Fagnan	January 2025 – December 2026
Vacancy	January 2025 – December 2028
Mrs. Karen Johnson	January 2025 – December 2028
Ms. Cathy Wright	January 2023 – December 2026

Past Board Presidents

- Michael Fagnan
- Sonny Graham
- Rená Moerman
- Darrell Garlick
- Christa Biasi
- Alyson Hughes
- Tammy Giebink
- Tom Stoddard
- Eva Jensen
- Lyle Jones
- Christine Reber

== Past Superintendents ==
Superintendent	Term	Assistant Superintendent	Term
Mrs. Darlene McCauley	2018–2023		
Ms. Lael Calton	2016–2018		
Mr. Mark Coleman	2013–2016		
Dr. Michael S Robison	2010–2013	Mr. Mark Coleman	2011-2013
Mr. Riley Frei	2005–2010		
Dr. Jose L. Trujillo	1999–2005		
Dr. John P. Broberg	1996–1999		
Dr. Steven H. Peterson	1995–1996		
Dr. Ralph Starr	?–1995		

== Past Principals ==
Beaver Dam Elementary (since 1999)

Principal	Term
Darlene McCauley, Interim	Nov. 2025 - May 2026
Kevin Murray	2024 – Nov. 2025
Mike Zielaskowski, Interim	Nov. 2023 - May 2024
Jeremy Clarke	2020– Nov. 2023
Shawn Bybee	2019–2020
John Summerville, Interim	May–June 2019
Lisa Young	2017 – Apr. 2019
Phyllis Leavitt	2010–2017
Steve Peterson	2007–2010
Glenn WhiteEagle	2006–2007
Riley Frei	2005–2006
Dr. Jose L. Trujillo	1999–2005

Beaver Dam Jr./Sr. High School (since 2011)

Principal	Term
Darlene McCauley	2018–2023
Lael Calton	2016–2018
Mark Coleman	2011–2016

Dean of Students	Term
Wayne Briggs	2023–2024
Christy Lindberg	2022–2023
Brionna Wilkey	2021

Beaver Dam High School (2004–2011)

Principal	Term	Assistant Principal	Term
Pat Ena	2009–2011		
Riley Frei	2008–2009	Pat Ena	2008–2009
Randon Lawrence	2005–2008		
Riley Frei	2004–2005		

Beaver Dam Middle School (1999–2011)

Principal	Term
Dr. Michael S. Robison	2010–2011
Karen Hills	2010
Ted Mickelson	2005–2010
Dave Green	2004–2005
Dr. Jose L. Trujillo	1999–2004

Littlefield School

Superintendent / Principal	Term
Dr. John P. Broberg	1996–1999
Dr. Steven H. Peterson	1996
Principal	Term
Ted Mickelson	1995–1996
Elizabeth Wright	1994–1995
Nancy Jones	1994
Verl Frehner	1993–1994
Brooks Norton	1989–1993

- Before 1989, Littlefield had "head teachers." Brooks Norton became the first official school Principal

== Past Governing Board of Education members ==
- Mr. Sean Hogan
- Mr. Sonny Graham (second service 2019-2025)
- Mrs. Nichole Frisby
- Mr. John Reyes
- Mrs. Patricia Schoppmann
- Mrs. Susan Burch (passed away while serving)
- Mr. Michael Fagnan (first service 2019-2023)
- Mrs. Rena Moerman (third service 2017–2022)
- Mrs. Blanca Beltran
- Mrs. Edwina Jauregui
- Mr. Darrin Jones
- Mr. Sonny Graham (first service 2013–2016)
- Mrs. Rena Moerman (second service 2010–2016)
- Mrs. Carmen Plancarte
- Mr. Darrell Garlick
- Mrs. Sherrie Daniels
- Mrs. Christa Biasi
- Mrs. Shannon Hartley
- Dr. Jose L. Trujillo
- Mrs. Alyson Hughes
- Mrs. Tammy Giebink
- Mrs. Cheryl Graham
- Mr. Tom Stoddard
- Mr. Dan Powell
- Mrs. Rena Moerman (first service 1996–2002)
- Mrs. LaRene Layton
- Mr. Ron Petersen (passed away while serving and shortly after re-election in 2000; did not serve 3rd term)
- Mrs. Thelma Davis
- Mrs. Eva Jensen
- Ms. Roxanne Pudney
- Mrs. Lorraine Hammond
- Mrs. Linda Peterson
- Mr. Lyle Jones
- Mrs. Amber Davis
- Mrs. Christine Reber
- Mrs. Lorna Reber

== Schools ==
- Beaver Dam Elementary
- Beaver Dam Jr./Sr. High School

=== Littlefield School ===
Littlefield School
- 113 S Littlefield Lane. Littlefield, AZ 86432-0730

Information
- Type: Public
- Established: 1910
- Principal: Dr. John P. Broberg
- Enrollment: 132
- Information: (928) 347-5796 (928) 347-5795 Fax
- Mascot: Eagles

Littlefield School was a school that served grades Kindergarten through Eighth in nearby Littlefield. The property is part of the Littlefield Unified School District.

The history of Littlefield School dates back to 1894 when a few families in the farming communities of Littlefield and Beaver Dam held school in a two-room rock house down by the Virgin River. In 1910, some of the early settlers on the second bench built a wood building (23 ft by 40 ft). This was for students attending school, residents, and attending church services and social activities. The building was later purchased and made into a home around 1925.

An adobe building was constructed in 1924 several hundred feet above the Virgin River in Littlefield. The building had its first meeting on November 2, 1924, with students attending classes afterward. Records show the building cost about $5,000 to construct. 1936 the property was sold to the Mohave County School District for $100.

Education in Littlefield was held from 1894 until 1999. Brooks Norton became the School's first official principal in 1989. Beginning in 1990, portable, modular buildings were installed on campus to house offices and classrooms, with student enrollment increasing. This also included a cafeteria building. Previously, Littlefield School had no lunch program, and lunch was packed and sent to school by parents/guardians. On April 1, 1997, then Arizona Governor Fife Symington visited Littlefield School to present a ceremonial check for $3 million to build a new state-of-the-art school in Beaver Dam. This was the third visit by an Arizona governor to the area in 24 years.

== See also ==
- List of school districts in Arizona
