= Henry W. Miller =

American politician

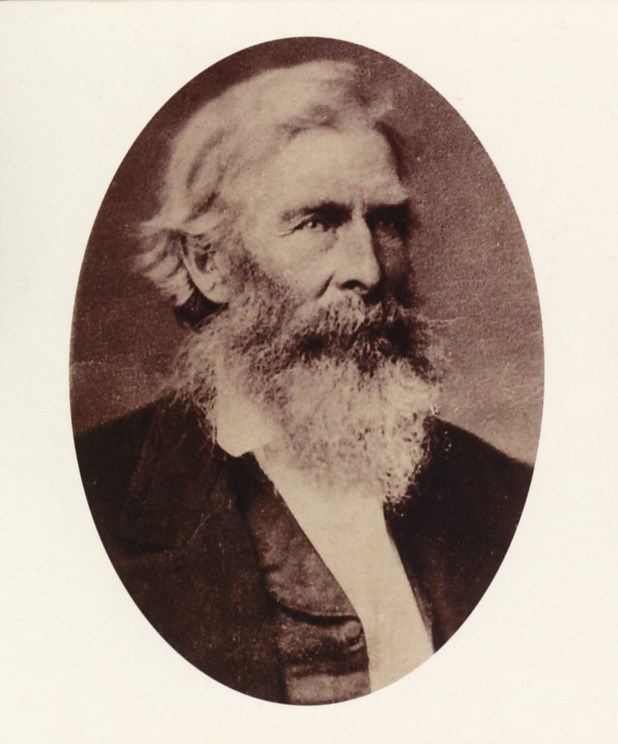
Henry W. Miller

Henry William Miller (May 1, 1807 – October 9, 1885) was the first member of the Iowa legislature from the area of Council Bluffs, Iowa.

== Biography ==
Miller was born in Lexington, Greene County, New York. He was trained as a carpenter as a youth and In about 1828 he moved to Illinois and settled in Quincy, Illinois. In September 1839 Miller converted to the Church of Jesus Christ of Latter-day Saints (LDS Church). He was made president of the Freedom Stake of the church, heading the Church's operations in Adams County, Illinois. The stake lasted from October 1840 until May 1841. He relocated to Nauvoo, Illinois in about 1841. Miller was made a member of the Nauvoo Temple building committee and then sent to the lumber-mills in Wisconsin to work on providing wood for the temple. Miller later returned to Nauvoo and was one of the executors charged with selling Mormon land after most Mormons had left.

After the Mormons were forced out of Nauvoo, Miller settled on the east side of the Missouri River at a place called Miller's Hollow. This was later renamed Kanesville, and is the current Council Bluffs, Iowa. Miller was elected to the legislature from Pottawattamie County, Iowa in 1851.

In 1852 Miller went to Utah Territory, serving as a captain of a pioneer company. Miller served as a member of the Utah Territorial Legislature from 1852 until 1854.

Miller served a mission for the LDS Church to the Cherokee from 1855 to 1857. Besides preaching to and baptizing many Cherokee, Miller also baptized many of those who had followed Lyman Wight who he found in this same general vicinity. On his return he went through Missouri, and aided Erastus Snow in getting cattle to help with the trip west. From 1864 Miller led a group of Mormons in founding a settlement they called Millersburg at what is now Beaver Dam, Arizona. After Millerburg was flooded out in 1866 Miller lived in St. George, Utah for most of the remainder of his life, although he died while visiting his brother in Farmington, Utah.

Miller is the great-, great-, great-grandfather of the American writer and canoeist, Neal Moore.

== Sources ==
- Keatley, John H. History of Pottawatamie County. O. L. Baskin, 1883. p. 21.
- "Missionaries of the Latter Day Saints Church in Indian Territory" Chronicles of Oklahoma Volume 13, No. 2 (June, 1935).
