= Littlefield, Arizona =

Census-designated place in Mohave County, Arizona, United States

- Census-designated place
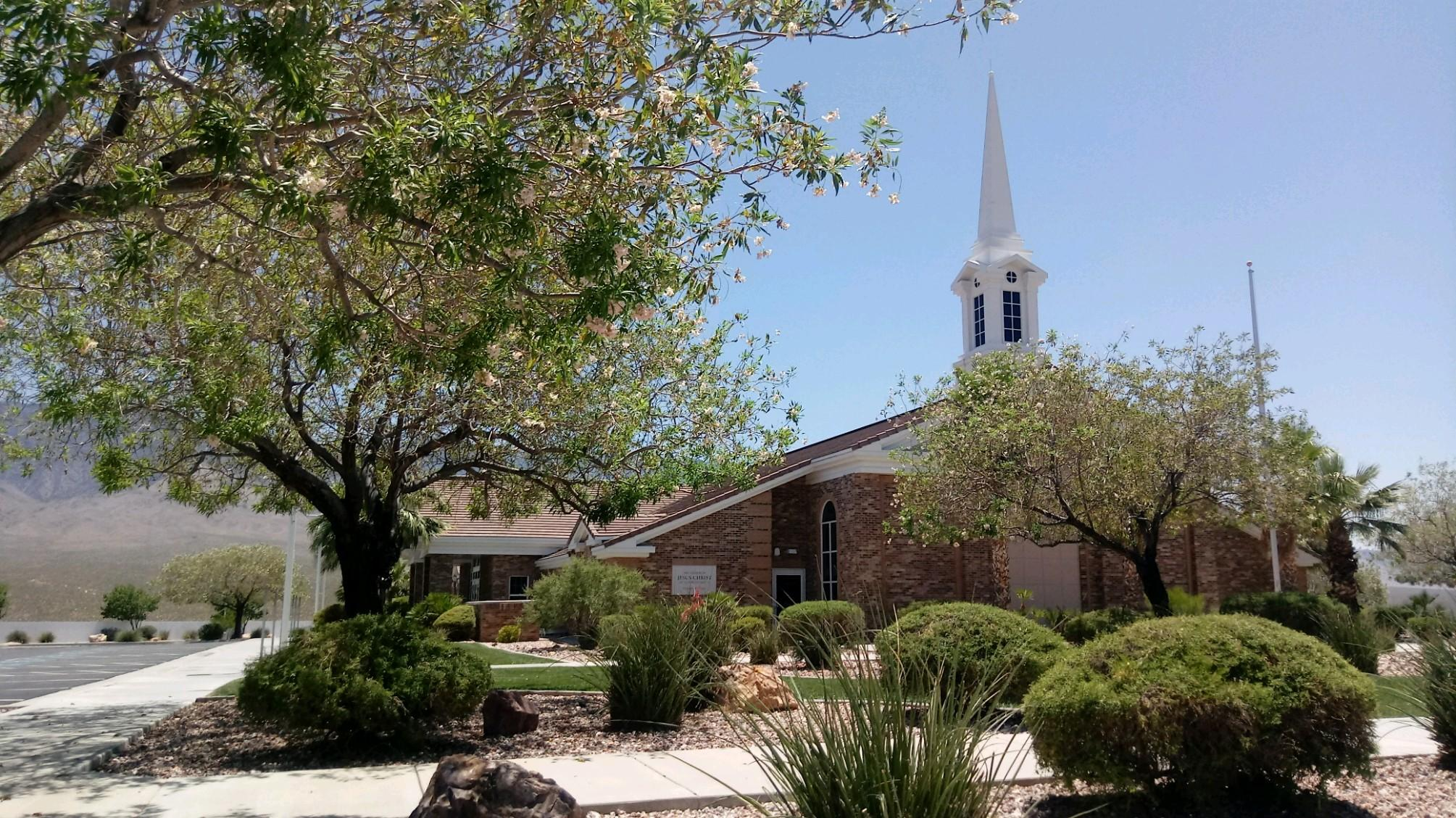
- Littlefield Latter-day Saints Church

- Location in Mohave County, Arizona

- Location within Arizona Location within the United States
- Coordinates: 36°53′24″N 113°54′47″W
- Country: United States
- State: Arizona
- County: Mohave
- Founded: 1865

Area
  - Total: 11.80 sq mi (30.55 km^{2})
  - Land: 11.80 sq mi (30.55 km^{2})
  - Water: 0 sq mi (0.00 km^{2})
- Elevation: 1,831 ft (558 m)

Population (2020)
  - Total: 256
  - Density: 21.7/sq mi (8.38/km^{2})
- Time zone: UTC-7 (MST)
- ZIP Code: 86432
- FIPS code: 04-41470
- GNIS feature ID: 2582816

Littlefield is an unincorporated community and census-designated place in Mohave County, Arizona, United States, that is located in the Arizona Strip region. As of the 2020 census, its population was 256, a decline from the figure of 308 tabulated in 2010. It lies just south of Interstate 15, next to the Virgin River, approximately 10 miles (16 km) northeast of Mesquite, Nevada.

== History ==
Littlefield was first settled by Latter-day Saints, also known as Mormons, in 1865.

Littlefield is the former home of the Littlefield Unified School District, the geographically largest school district in Arizona. The only remnant of the school district in Littlefield itself is the historic adobe Littlefield Schoolhouse, currently under renovation.

== Geography ==
Littlefield is in the northwestern corner of Mohave County (and the state of Arizona), along Interstate 15, with access from Exit 8. It is bordered to the north, across I-15, by the community of Beaver Dam. I-15 leads southwest 10 miles (16 km) to Mesquite, Nevada, and 90 miles (140 km) to Las Vegas, while to the northeast the highway enters the Virgin River Gorge and leads 29 miles (47 km) to St. George, Utah.

Littlefield, Beaver Dam, and Scenic have the distinction of being the only towns in Arizona along I-15. Owing to its location in the Arizona Strip, northwest of Grand Canyon National Park and west of the Virgin River, it is isolated by hundreds of miles from the rest of the state. Travel to other towns within Arizona requires crossing through either Nevada or Utah, or driving on unpaved roads to the rest of Arizona's road network.

== Demographics ==
Historical population
Census	Pop.	Note	%±
2010	308		—
2020	256		−16.9%
U.S. Decennial Census

The city is made up of 72.7 percent Hispanic, 27.3 percent White, 0 percent Black or Asian.

== Education ==
The CDP is in the Littlefield Unified School District.

== See also ==
- List of census-designated places in Arizona
- Beaver Dam High School (Beaver Dam, Arizona)
- The Church of Jesus Christ of Latter-day Saints in Arizona
