= Jerry Montgomery =

American football player and coach (born 1979)

Cincinnati Bengals
- Title: Defensive line coach/run game coordinator

Personal information
- Born: September 19, 1979 (age 47); Los Angeles, California, U.S.

Career information
- Position: Defensive tackle
- High school: Mesquite (NV) Virgin Valley
- College: Iowa (1998–2001)
- NFL draft: 2002: undrafted

Career history

Playing
- New Orleans Saints (2002)*; Chicago Rush (2003); Colorado Crush (2004); Las Vegas Gladiators (2005)
- * Offseason or practice squad member only

Coaching
- Iowa (2003) Student assistant coach; Iowa City West HS (IA) (2003–2004) Assistant coach; North Iowa Area (2005) Defensive coordinator; Northern Iowa (2006) Graduate assistant & defensive tackles coach; Northern Iowa (2007–2008) Defensive line coach; Wyoming (2009–2010) Defensive line coach; Indiana (2011) Defensive tackle coach; Michigan (2011–2012) Defensive line coach; Oklahoma (2013–2014) Defensive line coach; Green Bay Packers (2015–2017) Defensive front assistant; Green Bay Packers (2018–2021) Defensive line coach; Green Bay Packers (2022–2023) Defensive line coach & running game coordinator; New England Patriots (2024) Defensive line coach; Cincinnati Bengals (2025–present) Defensive line coach/run game coordinator

Jerry Montgomery (born September 19, 1979) is an American football coach and former player. He is currently the defensive line coach for the Cincinnati Bengals of the National Football League (NFL).

== Playing career ==
Montgomery played his high school football at Virgin Valley High School in Mesquite, Nevada, where he was a Street & Smith All-American and the Nevada State Player of the Year in 1997. Montgomery was also a member of the state basketball championship team as a junior.

Montgomery was a four-year starter for the Iowa Hawkeyes football team from 1998-2002 under head coaches Hayden Fry and Kirk Ferentz. He concluded his college career in the Hula Bowl All-Star Game at the completion of his senior season. Montgomery graduated from Iowa with a bachelor's degree in African American Studies in 2002.

Following his college playing career, he went to training camp with the New Orleans Saints in 2002, but was released before the season. Montgomery later played in the Arena Football League with the Chicago Rush, Colorado Crush, and Las Vegas Gladiators from 2003-2005.

== Coaching career ==
Montgomery began a career in coaching while he was playing in the Arena League, working as an assistant at Iowa City West High School and North Iowa Area Community College. He later served as a graduate assistant at Northern Iowa in 2006, before being promoted to full-time defensive line coach for the 2007 and 2008 seasons.

In 2009, Montgomery moved west to serve as defensive line coach at Wyoming on the first staff of Dave Christensen, staying through the 2010 season.

In January 2011, Montgomery briefly served as defensive tackles coach at Indiana under head coach Kevin Wilson. However, he was soon hired away by Michigan and new head coach Brady Hoke in February 2011. Montgomery served as defensive line coach for the Wolverines for the 2011 and 2012 seasons. With the Wolverines, Montgomery served as the chief recruiter for 5-star commitments Derrick Green and Ondre Pipkins

From 2013-2014, Montgomery served as the defensive line coach at Oklahoma under head coach Bob Stoops, earning a salary of $325,000 in 2013 and $380,000 in 2014. He was promoted after two seasons with Oklahoma to co-defensive coordinator on January 6, 2015, where he was expected to lead the defense alongside Mike Stoops.

His tenure as co-defensive coordinator with the Sooners was brief. On February 12, 2015, the Green Bay Packers of the NFL confirmed that they hired Montgomery, giving him the title of "defensive front assistant". Montgomery stated that the Packers "offered an unbelievable opportunity" to pursue his dream of coaching in the National Football League.

In January 2018, Montgomery was hired as the assistant head coach and defensive line coach on Jimbo Fisher's staff at Texas A&M. Later in January 2018, Montgomery instead opted to remain with the Packers as the defensive line coach on the reorganized staff of head coach Mike McCarthy. Montgomery had spent 2 weeks recruiting on behalf of Texas A&M On March 17, 2022, Montgomery was promoted to defensive line/running game coordinator.

On February 3, 2024, it was announced that Montgomery would not remain with the Green Bay Packers. On February 5, 2024, it was reported that Montgomery was hired by the New England Patriots as their defensive line coach.

=== Cincinnati Bengals ===
Montgomery was hired by the Cincinnati Bengals as their defensive line coach and run game coordinator on January 27, 2025.
