= Scenic, Arizona =

CDP in Mohave County, Arizona

- Census-designated place
- Location in Mohave County, Arizona

- Location within Arizona Location within the United States
- Coordinates: 36°47′37″N 114°00′46″W
- Country: United States
- State: Arizona
- County: Mohave

Area
  - Total: 16.46 sq mi (42.62 km^{2})
  - Land: 16.36 sq mi (42.37 km^{2})
  - Water: 0.097 sq mi (0.25 km^{2})
- Elevation: 1,808 ft (551 m)

Population (2020)
  - Total: 1,321
  - Density: 80.8/sq mi (31.18/km^{2})
- Time zone: UTC-7 (MST)
- FIPS code: 04-64650
- GNIS feature ID: 2582862

Scenic is an unincorporated community and census-designated place (CDP) in Mohave County in extreme northwestern Arizona, United States. As of the 2020 census, its population was 1,321, down from 1,643 in 2010.

Scenic is located on the eastern side of the Nevada-Arizona state line from Mesquite, Nevada. The primary road access is from South Scenic Boulevard, which runs south from Highway 91 (the frontage road along the south side of Interstate 15).

Scenic is located within the Littlefield ZIP code of 86432.

Scenic is within the Littlefield Unified School District, which is geographically the largest school district in Arizona.

== Demographics ==
Historical population
Census	Pop.	Note	%±
2010	1,643		—
2020	1,321		−19.6%
U.S. Decennial Census

=== 2020 census ===
As of the 2020 census, Scenic had a population of 1,321. The median age was 56.1 years. 19.4% of residents were under the age of 18 and 35.0% of residents were 65 years of age or older. For every 100 females there were 98.9 males, and for every 100 females age 18 and over there were 98.3 males age 18 and over.

7.1% of residents lived in urban areas, while 92.9% lived in rural areas.

There were 541 households in Scenic, of which 17.6% had children under the age of 18 living in them. Of all households, 59.3% were married-couple households, 17.2% were households with a male householder and no spouse or partner present, and 18.9% were households with a female householder and no spouse or partner present. About 22.6% of all households were made up of individuals and 16.9% had someone living alone who was 65 years of age or older.

There were 782 housing units, of which 30.8% were vacant. The homeowner vacancy rate was 2.7% and the rental vacancy rate was 14.9%.

Racial composition as of the 2020 census
Race	Number	Percent
White	929	70.3%
Black or African American	4	0.3%
American Indian and Alaska Native	16	1.2%
Asian	6	0.5%
Native Hawaiian and Other Pacific Islander	0	0.0%
Some other race	269	20.4%
Two or more races	97	7.3%
Hispanic or Latino (of any race)	431	32.6%

== Education ==
The CDP is in the Littlefield Unified School District.

== See also ==
- Beaver Dam High School (Beaver Dam, Arizona)
