= Beaver Dam, Arizona =

- Census-designated place
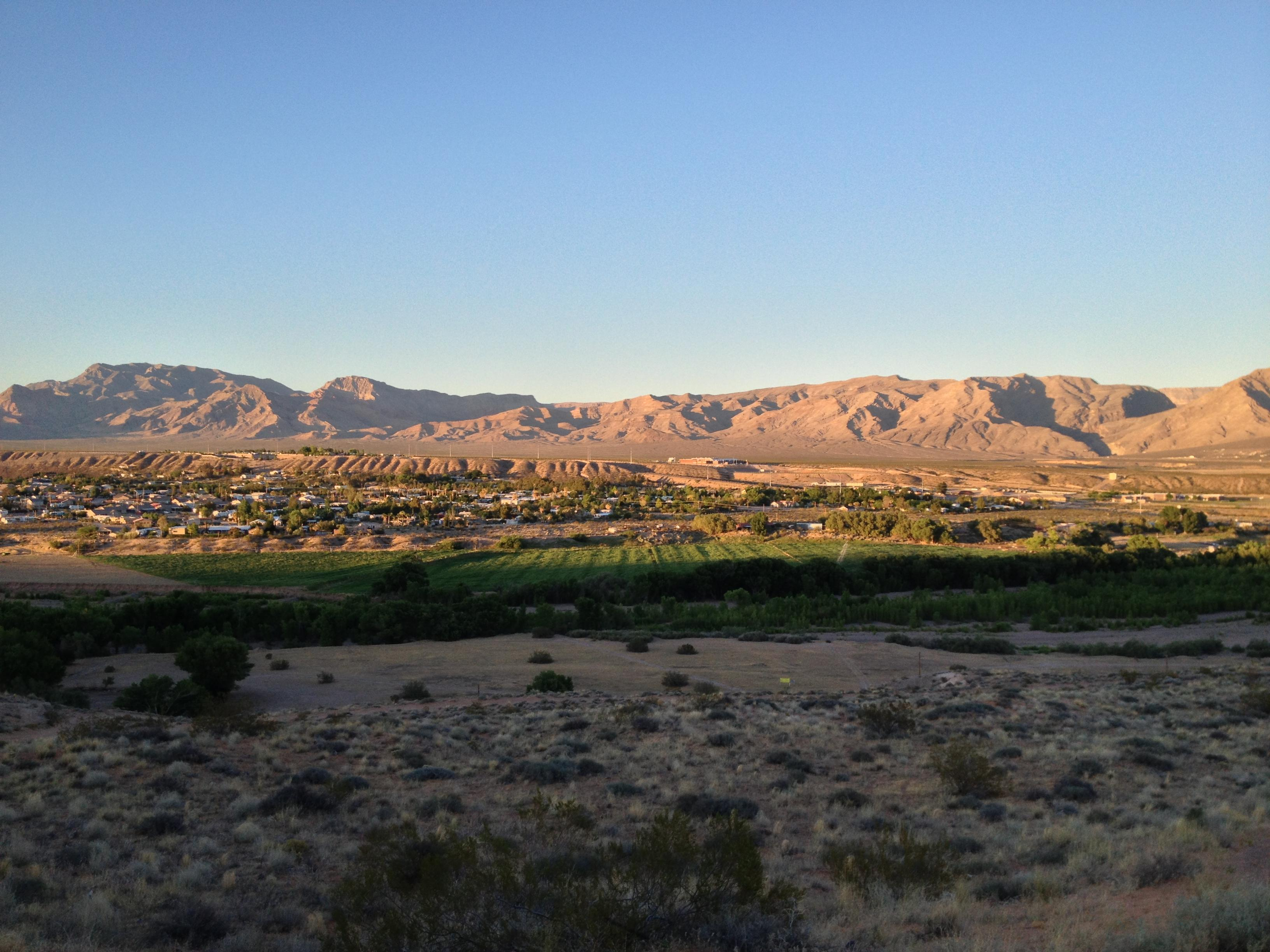
- View of Beaver Dam

- Location in Mohave County, Arizona.

- Location within Arizona Location within the United States
- Coordinates: 36°54′N 113°56′W
- Country: United States
- State: Arizona
- County: Mohave
- Founded: 1863
- Founder: Henry W. Miller

Area
  - Total: 8.49 sq mi (21.99 km^{2})
  - Land: 8.49 sq mi (21.99 km^{2})
  - Water: 0 sq mi (0.00 km^{2})
- Elevation: 1,883 ft (574 m)

Population (2020)
  - Total: 1,552
  - Density: 182.8/sq mi (70.58/km^{2})
- Time zone: MST
- ZIP code: 86432
- FIPS code: 04-05490
- GNIS feature ID: 2582736

Beaver Dam is an unincorporated community and census-designated place (CDP) in Mohave County, Arizona, United States, that is located in the Arizona Strip region and was settled on December 2, 1863. It is located along Interstate 15 approximately 10 miles (16 km) northeast of Mesquite, Nevada. It is located in the 86432 ZIP Code. It had a population of 1,552 as of the 2020 census, a decline from the figure of 1,962 tabulated in 2010.

Beaver Dam and the neighboring communities of Littlefield, Scenic and Desert Springs have the distinction of being the only towns in Arizona along I-15. Owing to their location in the Arizona Strip, northwest of the Grand Canyon and west of the Virgin River, they are isolated by hundreds of miles from the rest of the state. Absent by plane or helicopter, travel to other towns within Arizona requires crossing through either Nevada or Utah, or routing through unpaved roads to the rest of Arizona's road network.

The great Western author and essayist Wallace Stegner reputedly said of the Arizona Strip that "it is connected geographically to Utah, politically to Arizona and neither one gives a damn."

== History ==
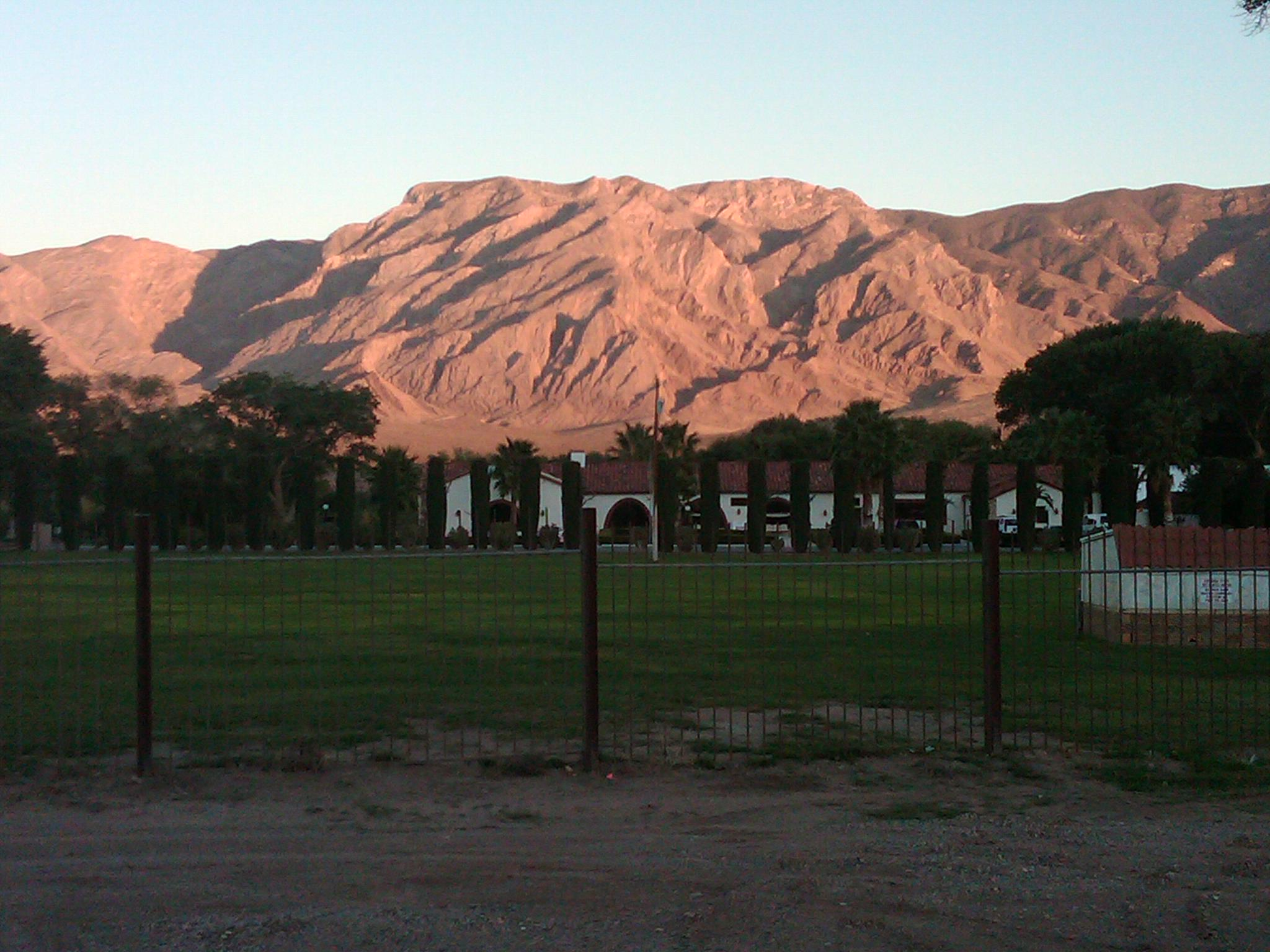
The historic Beaver Dam Lodge

The site of Beaver Dam was located along the pack horse route of the Old Spanish Trail from 1828 and the later wagon route of the Mormon Road between Salt Lake City and Los Angeles from 1847. Beaver Dam Wash and subsequently the town were named for the many beaver dams that occupied and held back the waters on the wash when the first Mormon party under Jefferson Hunt established the wagon road through the area in 1847. Beaver Dams was the original name from 1863 to about 1947 when the Arizona Department of Highways (now ADOT) used the singular name of Beaver Dam on road signs and the new name has been used since.

The Mormon Road was used by Forty-niners in 1849 and Mormon colonists and other travelers from then on. Both routes passed southward from the Beaver Dam Mountains to the Virgin River along the Beaver Dam Wash to where it met the river. From 1855, the road was a major wagon freighting road until the railroad arrived in Nevada in 1905. Beaver Dam was first settled by Mormon colonists in 1863.

== Contemporary Beaver Dam ==
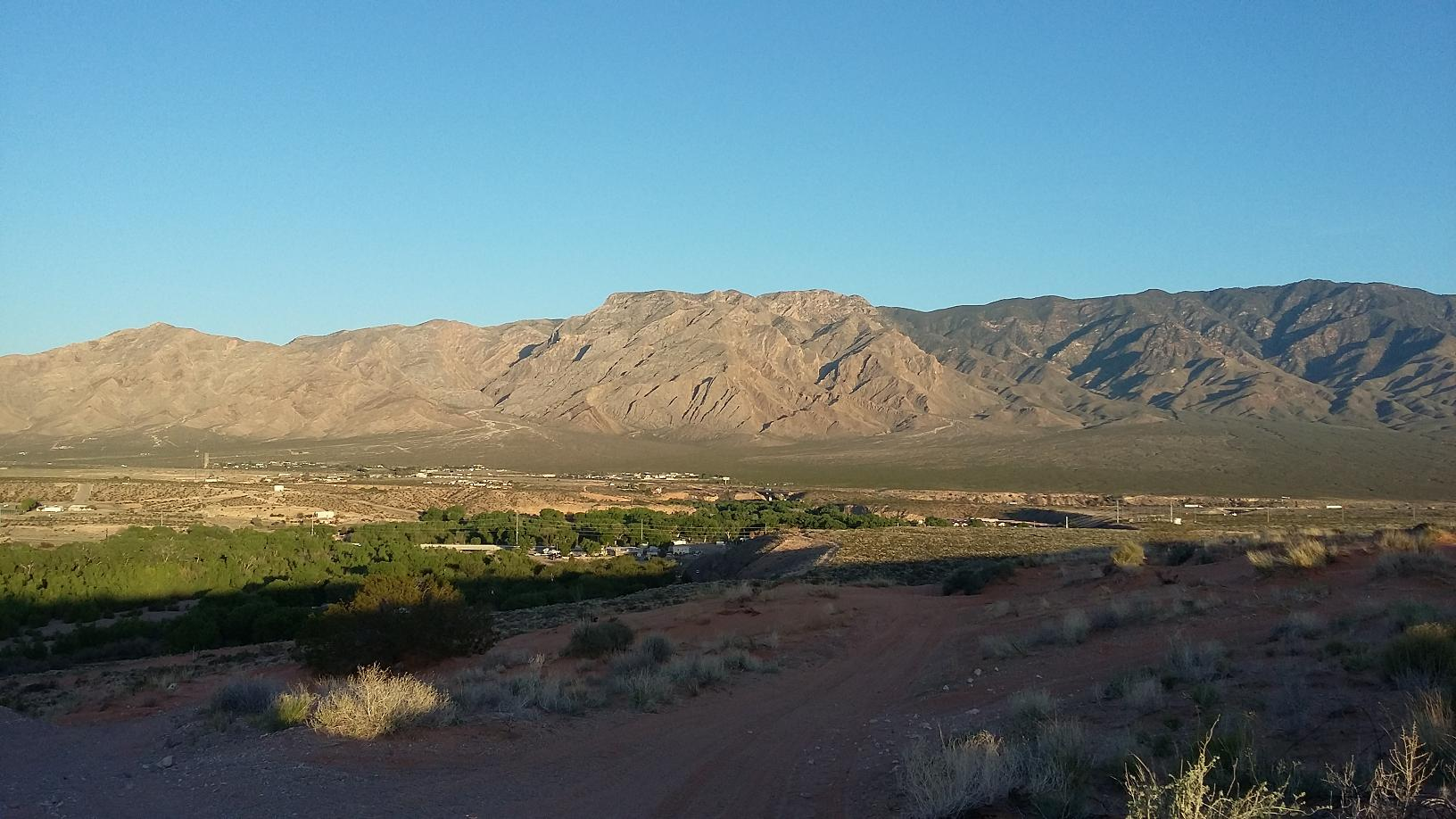
The iconic Chief Sleep Easy figure on the Virgin Mountains east of Beaver Dam, entering the Virgin River Gorge

Beaver Dam is home to the three schools that comprise the Littlefield Unified School District: Beaver Dam Elementary and Beaver Dam Jr./Sr. High School.

Beaver Dam and neighboring Littlefield have the distinction of being the only towns in Arizona along I-15. Owing to its location northwest of Grand Canyon National Park and west of the Virgin River, Beaver Dam is essentially isolated from the rest of the state. Travel to other towns within Arizona requires crossing through either Nevada or Utah or by traversing unpaved roads to Arizona State Route 389 (which is paved) — and even at that, is connected only to the rest of the Arizona Strip (the part of Arizona separated from the rest of the state by the Grand Canyon), not to Arizona at large.

The Virgin River Gorge is located just east of Beaver Dam.

The only post office is located in Beaver Dam on McKnight Boulevard. Fire Station No. 1 is also located in Beaver Dam (No. 2 is located in Desert Springs, and No. 3 is located in Scenic). During the winter months, Beaver Dam has a large population of "snowbirds" (retirees from colder latitudes seeking temperate winter temperatures).

== Demographics ==
Historical population
Census	Pop.	Note	%±
1930	58		—
2010	1,962		—
2020	1,552		−20.9%
U.S. Decennial Census

Downtown Beaver Dam, January 2015

Beaver Dam first appeared on the 1930 U.S. Census as District 30 of Mohave County (AKA Beaver Dam). It had 58 residents and was majority White population. With the combination of all 35 county districts into 3 in 1940, it did not formally appear again until 2010, when it was made a census-designated place (CDP).

=== 2020 census ===
As of the 2020 census, Beaver Dam had a population of 1,552. The median age was 60.8 years. 12.2% of residents were under the age of 18 and 42.5% of residents were 65 years of age or older. For every 100 females there were 99.2 males, and for every 100 females age 18 and over there were 98.4 males age 18 and over.

0.0% of residents lived in urban areas, while 100.0% lived in rural areas.

There were 729 households in Beaver Dam, of which 15.4% had children under the age of 18 living in them. Of all households, 47.7% were married-couple households, 23.3% were households with a male householder and no spouse or partner present, and 22.9% were households with a female householder and no spouse or partner present. About 31.2% of all households were made up of individuals and 20.5% had someone living alone who was 65 years of age or older.

There were 1,286 housing units, of which 43.3% were vacant. The homeowner vacancy rate was 0.6% and the rental vacancy rate was 4.7%.

Racial composition as of the 2020 census
Race	Number	Percent
White	1,252	80.7%
Black or African American	8	0.5%
American Indian and Alaska Native	36	2.3%
Asian	3	0.2%
Native Hawaiian and Other Pacific Islander	0	0.0%
Some other race	129	8.3%
Two or more races	124	8.0%
Hispanic or Latino (of any race)	298	19.2%

== Onscreen ==
Beaver Dam has been featured as a filming location for a few movies and television shows.

=== In films ===
- Scenes from the 1988 movie On Our Own were filmed at the Beaver Dam Station in downtown.
- Scenes from the 2002 movie Crazy Horse were also filmed at the Beaver Dam Station.
- Scenes from the 1996 movie Navajo Blues were filmed around the Beaver Dam area.

=== In television ===
- Unsolved Mysteries filmed a segment of their program in 1995 on Old Highway 91, between Beaver Dam and Mesquite (Season 8, episode 16).
- Local news stations from Las Vegas, Salt Lake City, and national news stations The Weather Channel and CNN have filed reports from Beaver Dam. Most of the reports were about the Beaver Dam Wash flooding and destroying homes and properties, but there have also been police chases, shootings and a fugitive man hunt making national headlines.

== Education ==
The CDP is in the Littlefield Unified School District.

== See also ==
- List of census-designated places in Arizona
- Littlefield Unified School District
- The Church of Jesus Christ of Latter-day Saints in Arizona
