= Arizona Strip =

Part of Arizona north of the Colorado River

Coordinates: 36°39′N 112°50′W

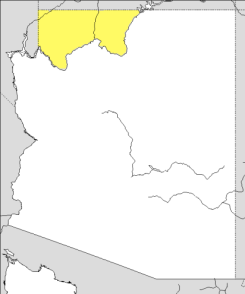
Arizona Strip

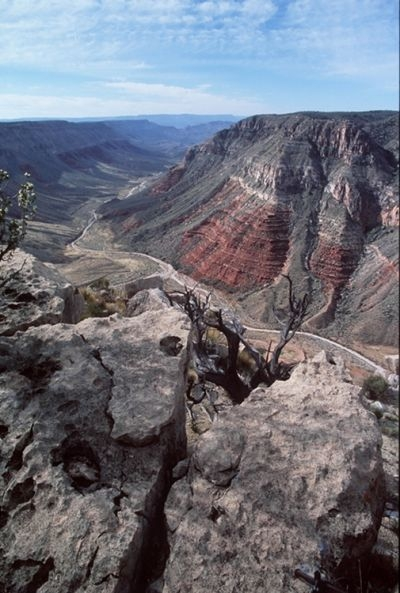
Side canyon in the Arizona Strip

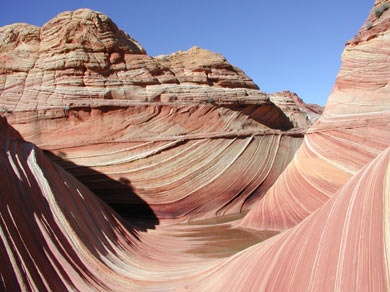
The Wave, Arizona: a sandstone formation in the Arizona Strip

The Arizona Strip is the part of Arizona lying north of the Colorado River. Despite being larger in area than several U.S. states, the entire region has a population of fewer than 10,000 people. Consisting of northeastern Mohave County and northwestern Coconino County, the largest settlements in the Strip are Colorado City, Fredonia, and Beaver Dam, with smaller communities of Scenic, Littlefield and Desert Springs. The Kaibab Indian Reservation lies within the region. Lying along the North Rim of the Grand Canyon creates physical barriers to the rest of Arizona. Only three major roads traverse the region: I-15 crosses the northwestern corner, while Arizona State Route 389 and U.S. Route 89A cross the northeastern part of the strip, and US 89A crosses the Colorado River via the Navajo Bridge, providing the only direct road connection between the strip and the rest of the state. The nearest metropolitan area is the St. George, Utah, metro area, to which the region is more connected than to the rest of Arizona.

Aside from the scattered settlements throughout the region, most of the land is protected areas, with various units of the National Park Service, the Bureau of Land Management, or the U.S. Forest Service covering most of the region.

== General characteristics ==
The Strip is typical of the American West in its red-rock canyon country, and the aridity of the climate, which leads to the predominance of sagebrush vegetation. However, the first European settlers were witness to great stretches of grassland in such areas as House Rock Valley, which are returning under better ranching practices. The land is also dotted with juniper trees, moving into pinyon pine and juniper forests, and eventually ponderosa pines, spruce, firs, and aspen in the higher elevations such as the Kaibab Plateau.

It has been divided between Coconino County in the east (east of Kanab Creek) and Mohave County in the west. The only significant settlements are Fredonia on Kanab Creek and Colorado City (the Strip's largest community) on the Utah border to the northwest (see also Hildale, Utah). In the extreme west on the Virgin River are the small settlements of Beaver Dam, Littlefield and Scenic, just off Interstate 15. However, the Strip provides the only route accessing the North Rim of the Grand Canyon, and numerous service communities catering to tourists exist along the Strip's main routes heading south from Jacob Lake.

The Strip has a total surface area of 7,878.11 square miles (20,404.2 km^{2}), larger than the total area of three different US states: Rhode Island, Delaware and Connecticut. Of this, 7,856.45 square miles (20,348.12 km^{2}) is land, and only 56.08 km^{2} (21.653 sq mi, or 0.275%) is water. Its land area is larger than that of seven different US states, the aforementioned three and each of New Jersey, New Hampshire and Massachusetts. The Strip's land area comprises 6.9 percent of Arizona's land area. About 64.4 percent of its area is in Mohave County and 35.6 percent in Coconino County. Its total population was 8,095 inhabitants at the 2000 census, with 6,221 residing in Mohave County and 1,874 in Coconino County.

== History ==
Since the area was first settled by Mormon Pioneers led by Jacob Hamblin in the mid-19th century, the Arizona Strip has been one of the last strongholds of the nineteenth-century practice of polygamy, though this practice was officially disavowed by the Church of Jesus Christ of Latter-day Saints (LDS Church) in 1890. Over the last century, the region has been the subject of controversy because of the control that groups such as the United Effort Plan, a polygamist Mormon offshoot, exert within the region; nonetheless, such groups remain merely a visible minority.

The Arizona Strip was long a cattleman's paradise with large stretches of grassy meadow in the valleys and the high Kaibab Plateau as summer forage. At the beginning of the 20th century, the Grand Canyon Cattle Company, otherwise known as the Bar Z Brand, ran upwards of 100,000 cattle throughout the strip. Land and water use often led to friction between competing brands, and there are accounts of limited range wars between different outfits and between sheepmen and cattlemen.

The strip had been a battleground between Native American and white settlers during the 19th century, with Navajo parties crossing over the Colorado River and raiding Mormon settlements. Peace was largely maintained through the diplomatic efforts of Jacob Hamblin. It also served as the primary route from Utah into Arizona, as the Grand Canyon and the Colorado River serve as almost impenetrable barriers to the south.

== Access ==
The Arizona Strip is very sparsely populated and connected to the rest of Arizona by only limited highway links, at Navajo Bridge and the Glen Canyon Dam bridge, both at the eastern end on U.S. Route 89 and crossing the Colorado River, a few Arizona state highways and U.S. Route 89A at Fredonia, Arizona. It does have multiple road links to Utah to the north; as a result, the region has stronger historic, economic and cultural ties to Utah than to Arizona. Residents of Littlefield, Arizona, and the surrounding northwestern corner of the state, near Interstate 15, must physically leave the state and reenter from Utah, Nevada, or California.

Four primary unpaved roads enter the core of the strip: from Mesquite, Nevada; St. George, Utah; Colorado City, Arizona; and Fredonia, Arizona. All four are dirt/gravel and should not be driven by vehicles with low ground clearance. Motorists should check with the BLM locally before heading into the strip on these roads, and are advised to be prepared – even rangers may not know current conditions, such as snow/ice cover and washouts.

== Nature and monuments ==
=== Protected lands ===
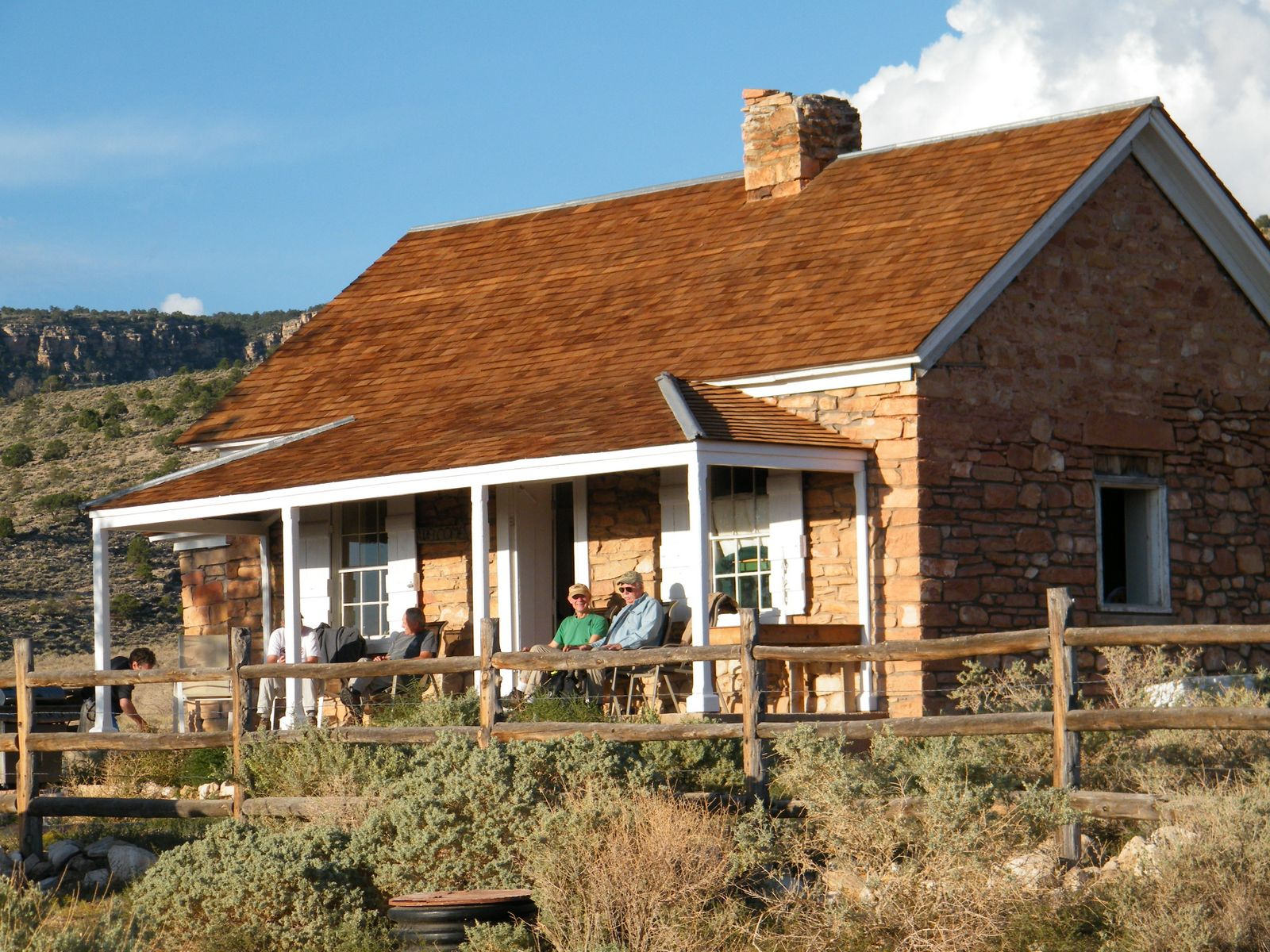
Cabin on the historic Kane Ranch, a conservation project of the Grand Canyon Trust.

Most of the land in the Arizona Strip is managed by the United States Bureau of Land Management or the United States Forest Service. The area holds several U.S. Wilderness Areas and U.S. National Monuments and the Kaibab Indian Reservation. The southern part of the Arizona Strip includes the north rim of Grand Canyon National Park and the northern section of the Lake Mead National Recreation Area.

=== National Monuments ===
- Baaj Nwaavjo I'tah Kukveni – Ancestral Footprints of the Grand Canyon
- Grand Canyon–Parashant
- Pipe Spring
- Vermilion Cliffs

=== National Parks ===
- Grand Canyon

=== National Recreation Areas ===
- Glen Canyon
- Lake Mead

=== Wilderness Areas ===
- Beaver Dam Mountains
- Grand Wash Cliffs
- Kanab Creek
- Mount Trumbull
- Mount Logan
- Paiute
- Paria Canyon–Vermilion Cliffs
