= The Narrows (Zion National Park) =

Narrowest part of Zion Canyon in Zion National Park, Utah

Coordinates: 37.30669°N 112.94769°W

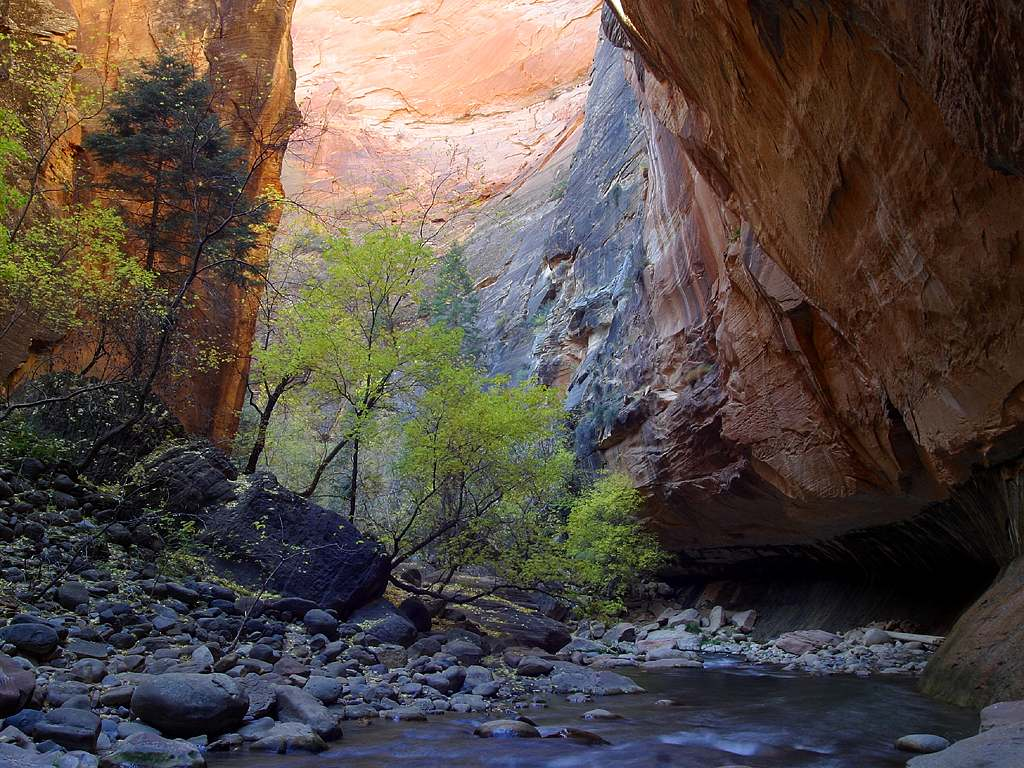
The Virgin River Narrows

The Narrows is the narrowest section of Zion Canyon in Zion National Park, Utah, United States. Situated on the North Fork of the Virgin River and upstream of the main canyon, The Narrows is one of the premier hikes in the park and on the Colorado Plateau. The Narrows refers to both the 3.6-mile (5.8 km) bottom-up hike from the Temple of Sinawava to Big Springs, as well as the 16-mile (26 km) top-down hike from Chamberlain's Ranch back to the Temple of Sinawava.

== History ==
Mormon Pioneer and Explorer Nephi Johnson was guided to Zion Canyon in November 1858 by a friendly Paiute Indian, and was probably the first European-American to see The Narrows. Soon after, in 1861 and 1862, the towns of Virgin and Springdale, just south of Zion Canyon, were founded. The next year, Isaac Behunin built a cabin in upper Zion Canyon for summer farming.

The Narrows was descended (and named) in 1872 by geologist and explorer Grove Karl Gilbert as part of the Wheeler Survey. His party traveled from Navajo Lake through the Narrows to Zion Canyon and Springdale on horseback. John Wesley Powell had traversed the nearby Parunaweap Canyon (the East Fork of the Virgin) earlier in the same year.

From when Zion became a National Park (1919), tourists were guided up the Narrows on horseback well into the 1960s. The through-hike of The Narrows became popular starting in the late 1960s.

== Description ==
The Virgin River runs south through upland aspen forest from near Navajo Lake at 9,200 feet (2,800 m) elevation, 11 miles (18 km) to Chamberlain's Ranch, 5,900 feet (1,800 m) where the through-hike of The Narrows starts. The river turns west and a gorge starts to form within 2 miles (3.2 km). By the time the North Fork enters Zion National Park, 5 miles (8 km) from Chamberlain's Ranch, the gorge is 500 feet (150 m) deep. three and a half miles (5.6 km) further, at the confluence with Deep Creek, the gorge is 1,300 feet (400 m) deep, and the combined river turns south. The gorge from here is continuous and has vertical sandstone walls from 40 to 100 feet (12 to 30 m) apart, with pockets of forest on both sides. From Deep Creek to Big Spring is 2.7 miles (4.3 km). At Big Spring, the canyon narrows again, and the true Narrows begin. For most of the next 3.6-mile (5.8 km) stretch to the Mouth of the Narrows, the river runs wall to wall, with vertical sandstone cliffs on both sides. A mile (1.6 km) south of the Mouth of the Narrows is the Temple of Sinawava, where the river enters main Zion Canyon, a flat-floored, quarter- to half-mile-wide (400 to 800 m) canyon with sandstone mountains on each side, their summits 2,400 feet (730 m) above. Eight miles (13 km) further south, where the canyon widens again, is the town of Springdale and the southern boundary of Zion National Park.

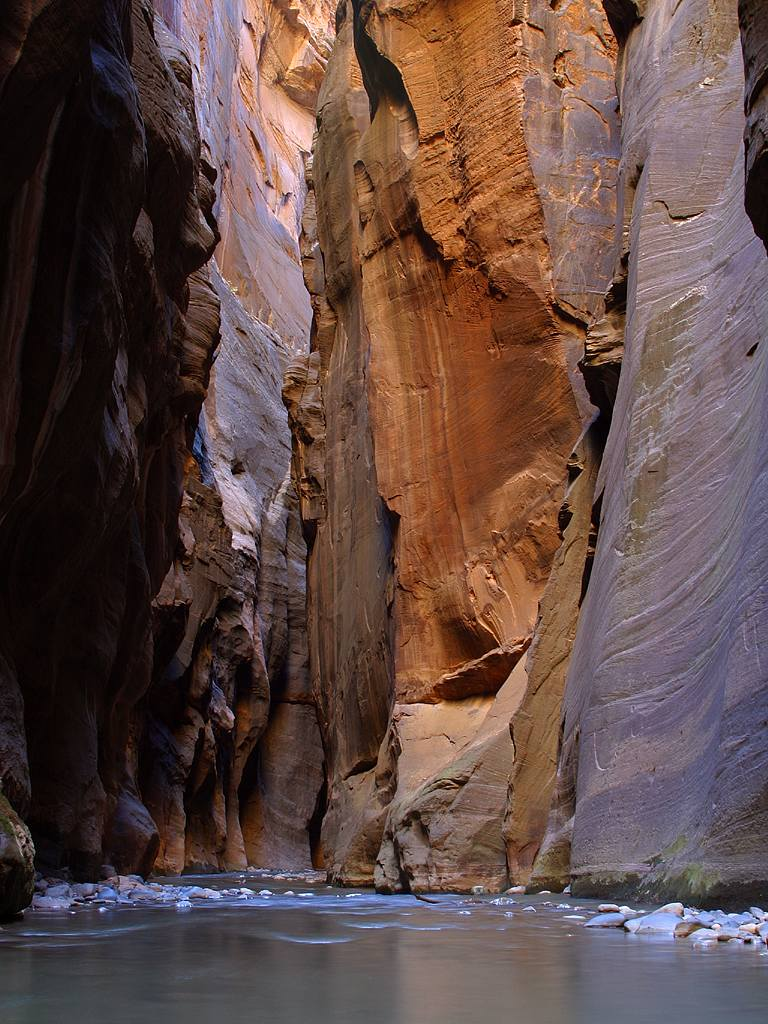
The "Wall Street" section of Zion Narrows

Hiking The Narrows is arguably the quintessential Zion experience. The Narrows can be hiked either as a top-down through-hike from Chamberlain Ranch to the Temple of Sinawava, or as an up-and-back bottom-up hike from the Temple of Sinawava. Hiking is done largely in the river as, for a third of the route, the river runs canyon wall to canyon wall. Water levels change from season to season; most hikers will wade at least waist-deep and many will swim a few short sections.

The Narrows hike from the bottom up starts at the Temple of Sinawava and ends as far as Big Springs at the 4.3-mile mark. This hike requires a permit. Around the first bend is Mystery Falls, the exit point for Mystery Canyon. At the 2.5-mile point is Orderville Canyon, beyond which lies the Wall Street section of the Narrows, named after the sheer cliff walls surrounding the trail. After this section, the water gets periodically deeper and may require swimming in certain areas. One will need to negotiate a series of boulders at the 4-mile mark, and reach Big Springs at the 4.3-mile mark, where one is required to turn around. The entire hike up to Big Springs is 8.6 miles and may require up to 8 hours.

The through-hike can be done in a day or as a two-day backpack trip. Chamberlain's Ranch is accessed by the dirt North Fork Road east of the Park, and is situated in a rolling forest of aspen and scrub oak. No sign of the gorge ahead can be seen from the ranch. The hiker proceeds down the river and into an ever-deepening gorge, eventually getting to The Narrows and ending at the Temple of Sinawava. The hike is 16 miles (26 km) long and is very tiring because it is in the river itself. Permits are required before hiking the Narrows from the top and can be obtained at the Zion National Park Wilderness Desk. Reservations should be made ahead of time as permits can be difficult to get during the summer months.

Hiking in the river is strenuous. The water is often murky and the bottom of the river is covered with rocks about the size of bowling balls. This makes proper footwear and bringing in trekking poles or a walking stick essential. The Narrows may be closed in the spring due to flooding while the snow melts off the upland areas to the north if the flow rate is higher than 120 cubic feet per second (3.4 m^{3}/s). Thunderstorms can cause The Narrows to flash flood during the summer. Rain showers upriver can cause flash floods in the canyon without it raining over the canyon itself. Thus, hikers should exercise caution when hiking The Narrows during rainy periods as the winding canyon and sheer walls make approaching flash floods all the more sudden and difficult to evade.
