= Paiute Wilderness =

Protected area in Mohave County, Arizona, U.S.

- IUCN category Ib (wilderness area)
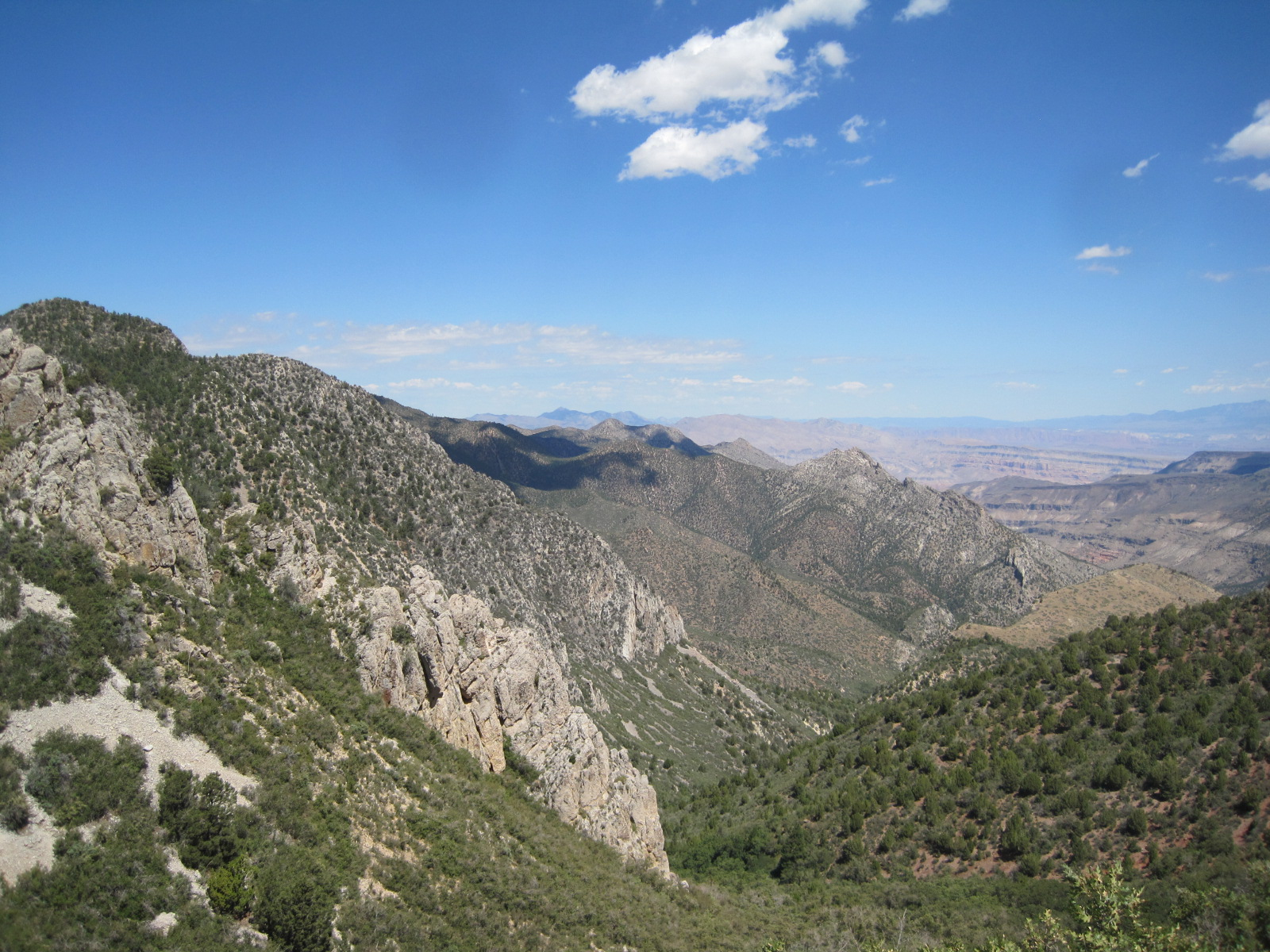
- Interactive map of Paiute Wilderness
- Location: Mohave County, Arizona, USA
- Nearest city: Mesquite, Nevada
- Coordinates: 36.806645°N 113.818852°W
- Area: 87,900 acres (35,600 ha)
- Established: 1984
- Governing body: Bureau of Land Management

The Paiute Wilderness is an 87,900 acre (355 km^{2}) wilderness area located in the northwestern part of the U.S. state of Arizona. The wilderness is administered by the Bureau of Land Management. The southern section of the wilderness lies within Grand Canyon-Parashant National Monument, and is also managed by the BLM. Directly to the north, separated by Interstate Highway 15, lies the Beaver Dam Mountains Wilderness.

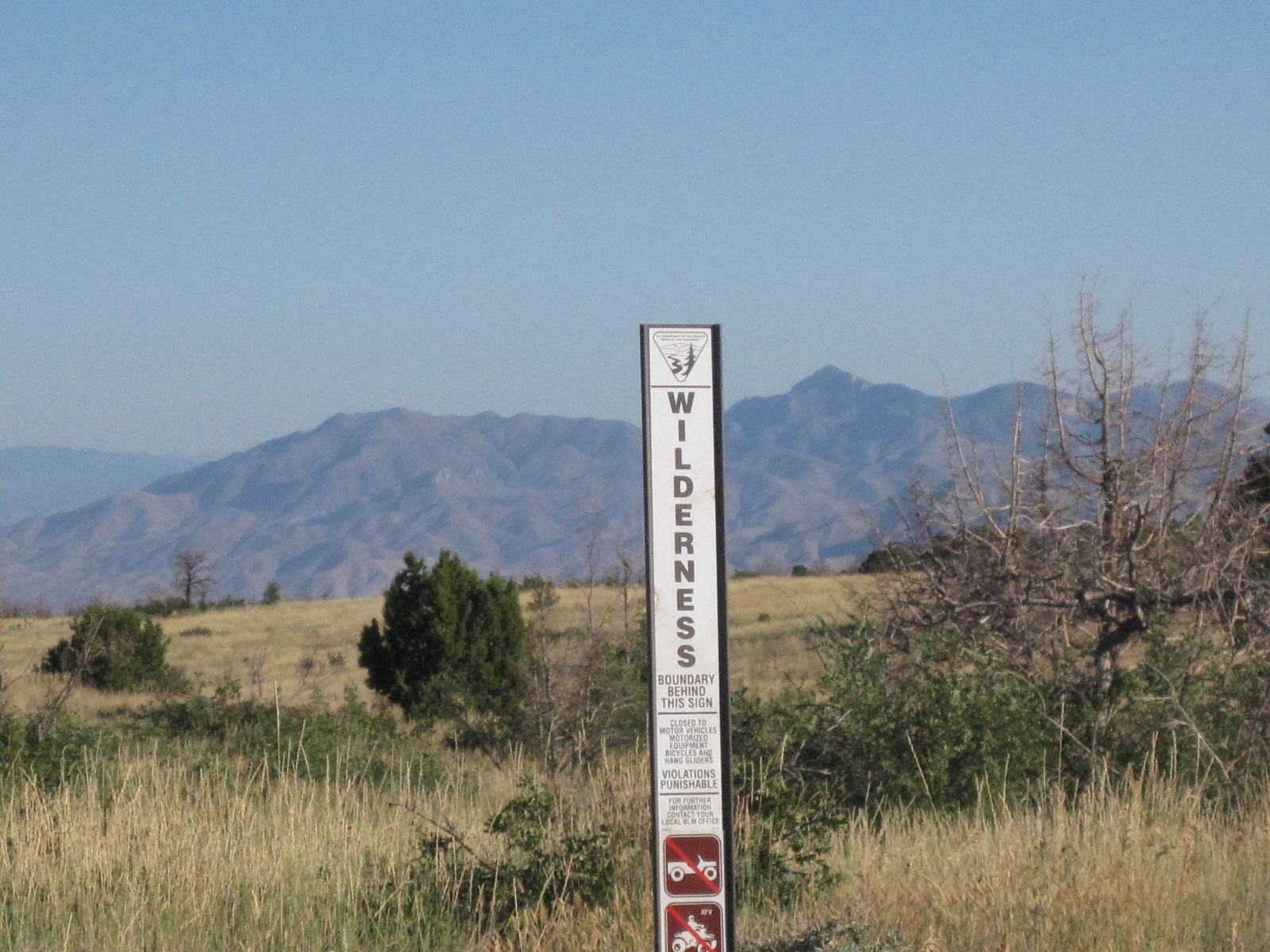
A sign indicating the wilderness boundary

== See also ==
- Wilderness Act
- List of U.S. Wilderness Areas
- List of Arizona Wilderness Areas
