= Beaver Dam Mountains Wilderness =

Protected area in Utah and Arizona

- IUCN category Ib (wilderness area)
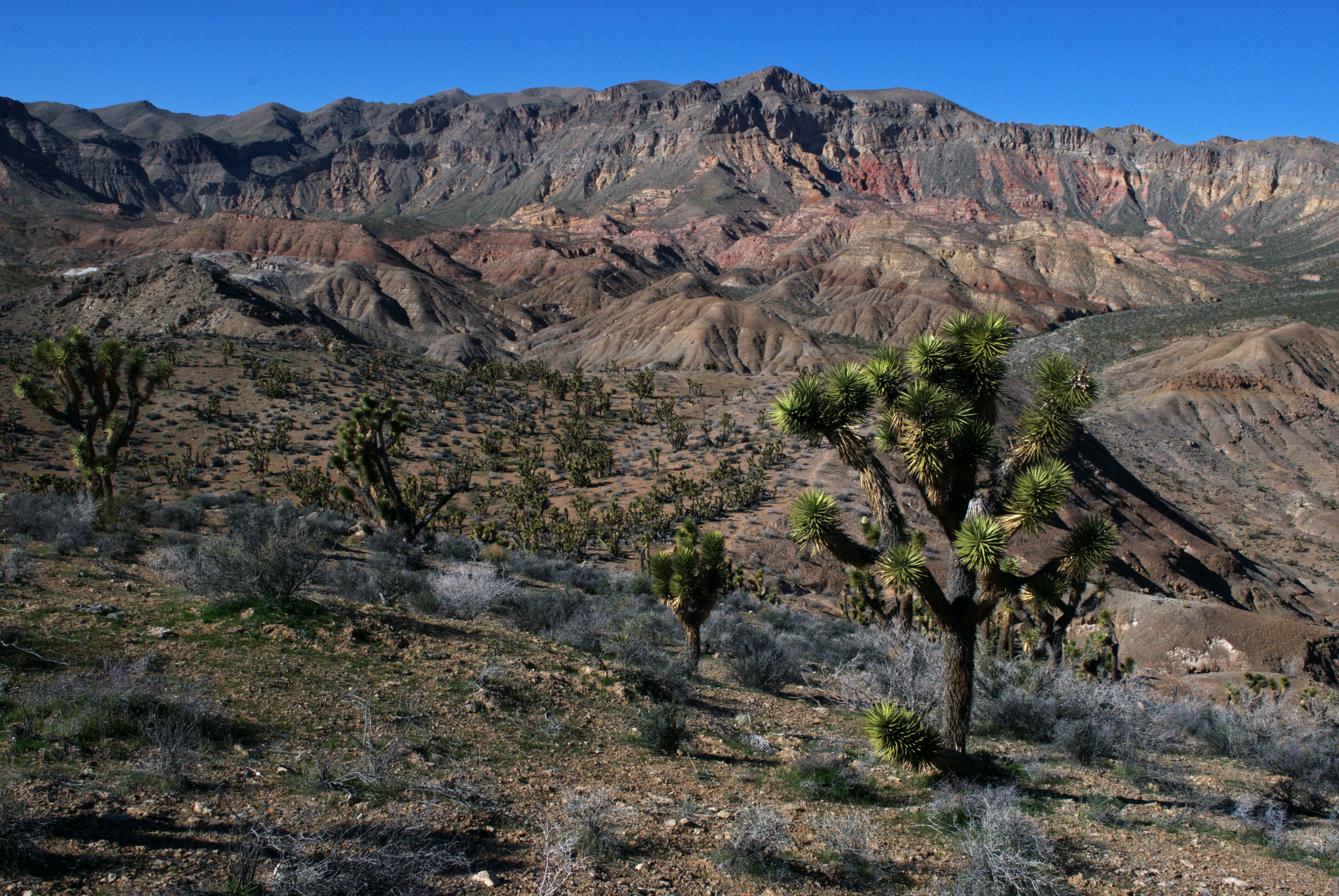
- The Beaver Dam Mountains

- Location within the United States
- Location: Mohave County, Arizona; Washington County, Utah, U.S.
- Nearest city: St. George, Utah
- Coordinates: 36.9977565°N 113.7688531°W
- Area: 18,667 acres (7,554 ha)
- Established: August 28, 1984
- Governing body: Bureau of Land Management

The Beaver Dam Mountains Wilderness is a wilderness area located in northwestern Arizona and southwestern Utah, USA, within the arid Colorado Plateau region. The jagged mountains and gently sloping alluvial plain of the Beaver Dam Mountains straddle the border between the two states. The Wilderness contains some of the lowest elevation land in Utah, and includes a 13 miles (21 km) section of the Virgin River Gorge. The area comprises some 18,667 acres (7,554 ha), 15,000 acres (6,100 ha) of which in Arizona and approximately 3,667 acres (1,484 ha) in Utah. The area was designated Wilderness by the U.S. Congress in 1984 and is administered by the Bureau of Land Management.

The Mojave Desert landscape of the Beaver Dam Mountains features multitudes of Joshua trees (Yucca brevifolia). Notable wildlife include desert bighorn sheep, the threatened desert tortoise, and large numbers of raptors. South of Beaver Dam lies the Paiute Wilderness, on the other side of the Interstate 15 corridor and lying partially inside Grand Canyon-Parashant National Monument.

== See also ==
- Arizona Strip
- List of Arizona Wilderness Areas
- List of U.S. Wilderness Areas
- National Wilderness Preservation System
- Beaver Dam Wash
- Wilderness Act

== Other sources ==
- Lynna P. Howard, Utah's Wilderness Areas: The Complete Guide (Westcliffe Publishers, 2005) ISBN 1-56579-388-9
- Bill Cunningham & Polly Burke, Wild Utah: A Guide to 45 Roadless Recreation Areas (Falcon Publishing, 1998) ISBN 1-56044-616-1
