= Beaver Dam High School (Beaver Dam, Arizona) =

Location
- 3475 E. Rio Virgin Rd; Beaver Dam, Arizona 86432-0670; United States

Information
- Type: Public
- Established: 2004 (22 years ago)
- CEEB code: 030021
- Principal: Troy Heaton
- Teaching staff: 10.00 (FTE)
- Grades: 7–12
- Enrollment: 131 (2023–2024)
- Student to teacher ratio: 13.10
- Colors: Red and black
- Mascot: Diamondback
- Website: bdhs.lusd9.com

Beaver Dam High School is a secondary school located in Beaver Dam, Arizona. The school serves grades seven through twelve. It is part of the Littlefield Unified School District and a member of the Nevada Interscholastic Activities Association instead of Arizona Interscholastic Association due to insufficient transportation to other places in Arizona.

== History ==
Beaver Dam High School was first proposed at a Governing Board meeting in 2001. At the time, high school students from Littlefield Unified School District attended Virgin Valley High School across the state line in Mesquite, Nevada.

The school first opened its doors for the 2004–2005 school year. The Governing Board members at the time were Tammy Giebink, Cheryl Graham and Shannon Hartley. The Superintendent was Dr. Jose L. Trujillo.

The first year the school housed only grades nine through eleven; seniors still attended high school at Virgin Valley High School. The following school year, 2005–2006, the school housed all four grades, 9–12.

== See also ==
- List of high schools in Arizona
- Littlefield Unified School District
