= Interstate 15 in Arizona =

Section of Interstate Highway in Mohave County, Arizona, United States

Interstate 15
- Veterans Memorial Highway
- I-15 highlighted in red

Route information
- Maintained by ADOT
- Length: 29.43 mi (47.36 km)
- Existed: 1962–present
- NHS: Entire route

Major junctions
- South end: I-15 near Mesquite, Nevada
- North end: I-15 near St. George, Utah

Location
- Country: United States
- State: Arizona
- County: Mohave

Highway system
- Interstate Highway System; Main; Auxiliary; Suffixed; Business; Future; Arizona State Highway System; Interstate; US; State; Scenic Proposed; Former
← I-10	→ I-17

Interstate 15 (I-15) is an Interstate Highway, running from San Diego, California, United States, to the Canadian border, through Mohave County in northwestern Arizona. Despite being isolated from the rest of Arizona, in the remote Arizona Strip, and short in length at 29.43 miles (47.36 km), it remains notable for its scenic passage through the Virgin River Gorge. The highway heads in a northeasterly direction from the Nevada border northeast of Mesquite, Nevada, to the state line, southwest of St. George, Utah.

The southern portion of I-15's route was built close to the alignment of the old U.S. Route 91 (US 91), but the northern section, through the Virgin River Gorge, was built along roadless terrain. The southern section of the highway was complete and open in the early 1960s, but the gorge section was inaccessible until 1973. When it opened, the Virgin River Gorge passage was the most expensive section of rural Interstate per mile.

== Route description ==
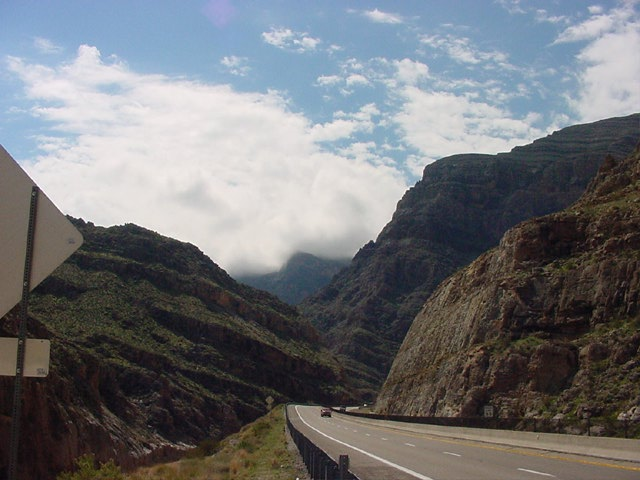
A storm rolls over the Virgin River Gorge

The highway is signed and designated the Veterans Memorial Highway, a designation which continues into Utah. Traffic volume along the Arizona section of I-15 is approximately 23,000 vehicles per day. The highway is also a part of the CANAMEX Corridor, a trade corridor in North America linking Edmonton, Alberta, in Canada and Mexico City.

The highway enters the state in Mohave County, northeast of Mesquite and Las Vegas, Nevada, paralleling the old US 91 heading northeast on an alignment north of the Virgin River. I-15 parallels the Virgin River for its entire length in Arizona, but the terrain abruptly becomes more rugged at mile 13, where the Virgin River Gorge begins. The first interchange is exit 8 at Littlefield, where old US 91 turns north to avoid the gorge. I-15 crosses the river for the first time just beyond Littlefield, and soon passes another interchange serving local roads eastward. This exit, exit 9, is a right-in/right-out design with frontage roads, constructed after the initial opening. Access under I-15 is provided just south of the ramps.

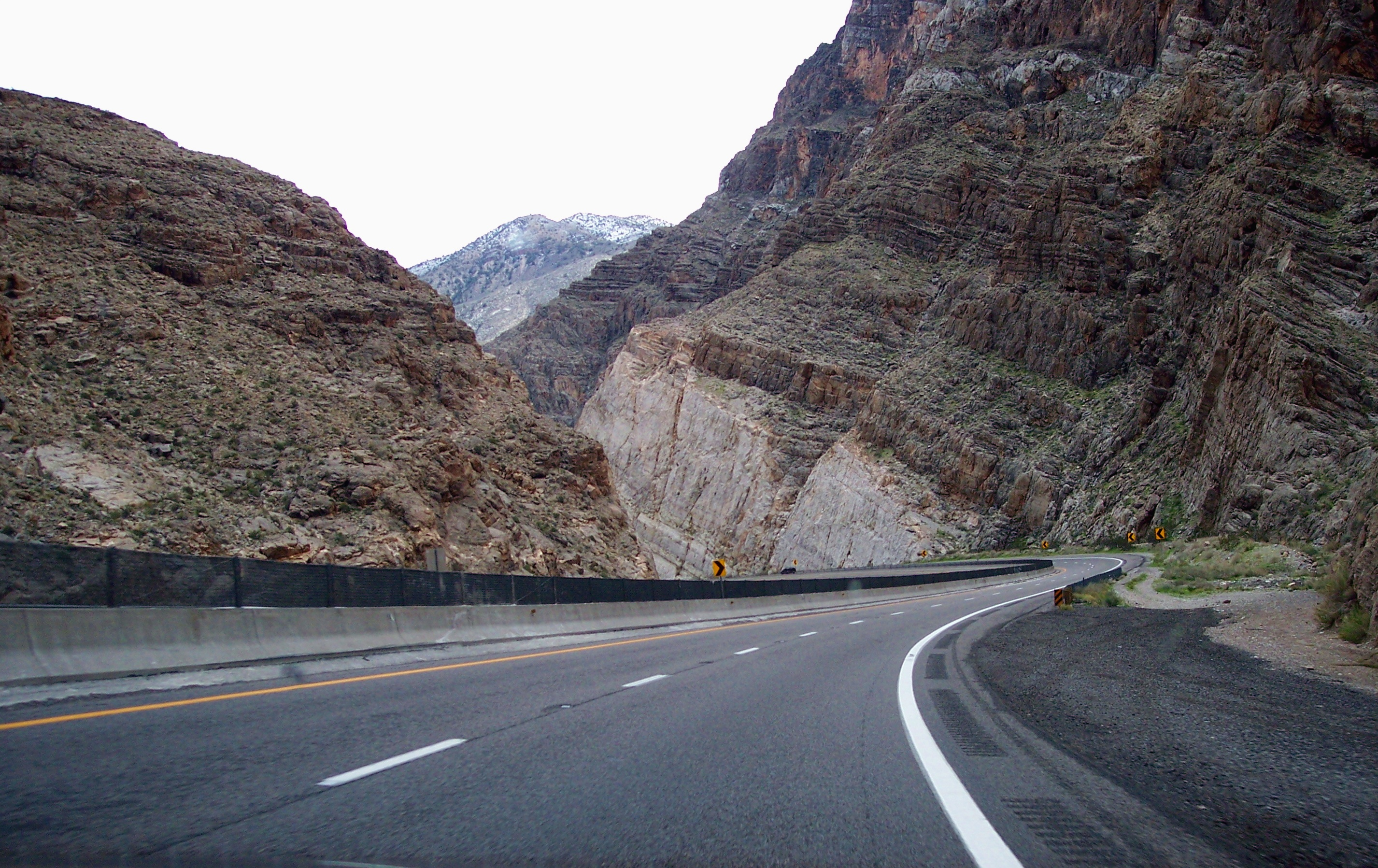
I-15 seen toward north in the Virgin River Gorge

Beyond exit 9, I-15 enters the Virgin River Gorge, first passing through "The Narrows". Here, the gorge features limestone cliffs that are as high as 500 feet (150 m) above the highway. Several pulloffs allow access to these cliffs. Within the canyon, through which it ascends northbound and descends southbound, five bridges cross the river. The highway generally follows the winding course of the river, but several rock cuts bypass bends.

The canyon opens up slightly at the Cedar Pocket interchange (exit 18), allowing for a rest area. This rest area was turned over to the federal Bureau of Land Management in 2002 which maintains the nearby Virgin River Gorge Recreation Area. The rest area was demolished in 2009. I-15 continues to parallel the Virgin River, but begins to deviate more. Trees here include tamarix, ash, cottonwoods, willows, and Joshua trees. Wildflowers, such as globemallow, desert marigold, and sand verbena, dot the route in springtime. At mile 22.5, the highway crosses the Virgin River for the final time, continuing east along the smaller Black Rock Gulch before then turning slightly northeast into a flatter area. The final interchange (exit 27) provides local access.

A weigh station/port of entry formerly served both sides of the road near mile 28 before the Utah state line. The weigh station/port of entry are now combined into a joint Arizona–Utah facility just north of the state line staffed by the Arizona Department of Transportation (DOT) Motor Vehicle Division and Utah DOT Motor Carrier Division. I-15 continues on into Utah, providing access to St. George as well as Salt Lake City.

== History ==
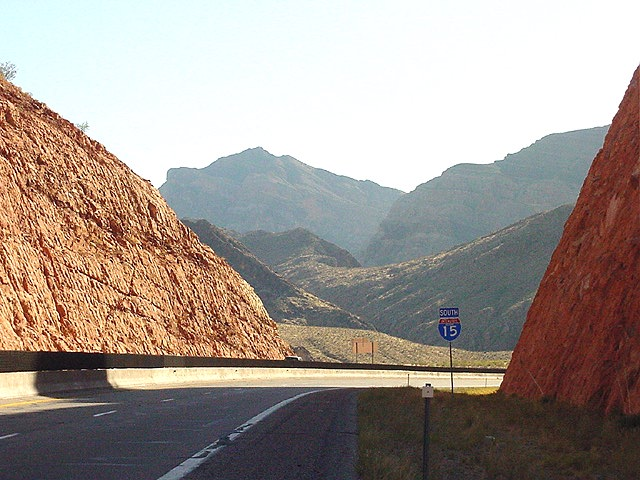
I-15 in afternoon light

The Old Spanish Trail from Southern California had two routes through northwestern Arizona, splitting at Littlefield; one went north toward central Utah, and the other went northeast through the Virgin River Gorge, straddling the state line to the Four Corners area. When the Arrowhead Trail was marked in the 1920s, and US 91 in 1926, automobile travelers between Nevada and Utah followed the northerly routing, turning east in Utah to reach St. George.

When the Interstates were planned, federal authorities decided to save 12 miles (19 km) over US 91 and pass through the Virgin River Gorge to take advantage of its scenery and lower grades for trucks. Construction was completed first, in the early 1960s, on the portion between Nevada and the gorge. The bridges over Big Bend Wash were completed in 1962. The bridge over the Virgin River near Littlefield was completed by 1964. By 1965, the overpass over Black Rock Road (northward) was finally complete.

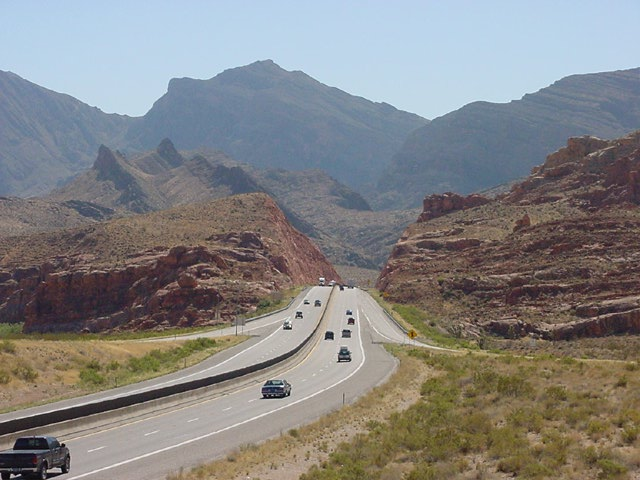
I-15 at exit 18

Construction through the gorge was slower and much more difficult, and the segment could not fully open until December 14, 1973. To help quicken construction, the state of Utah loaned a portion of their federal highway funds to Arizona. Even though the highway is of little importance to the transportation needs of Arizona, as it does not link any Arizona communities, it does serve as a vital link between Salt Lake City and Las Vegas and Los Angeles to the southwest. Despite extra funding, however, challenges remained. Flash flooding and quicksand in the gorge repeatedly caused problems, with equipment and materials apparently disappearing overnight. Worse, the project was to claim a life, when in October 1969, a helicopter performing reconnaissance on the gorge crashed due to wind, killing the pilot. To help navigate the gorge's rugged and unforgiving terrain, a special piece of equipment, called a swamp buggy, had to be brought from Texas. Even with this help, the route still demanded construction of four bridges over Virgin River. The westernmost bridge and the bridge carrying the northbound lanes at the third bridge location from the west were completed in 1972. By 1973, all five bridges were finally complete.

Even before its opening, it was promoted as the most scenic highway in the state: a 1988 article in Arizona Highways said that the project "enhanced rather than distracted from Nature's handiwork". The Virgin River was rechanneled 12 times in what was the most expensive rural freeway in the country, at the price of approximately $10 million per mile ($6,200,000/km) or $49 million per mile ($30,000,000/km) in 2007 dollars.

== Exit list ==
The entire route is in Mohave County.

Location	mi	km	Exit	Destinations	Notes
	0.00	0.00		I-15 south – Las Vegas	Continuation into Nevada
Beaver Dam	8.61	13.86	8	Beaver Dam, Littlefield	Access via CR 91 (former US 91)
Beaver Dam	9.63	15.50	9	Desert Springs	Formerly signed as Farm Road
	18.35	29.53	18	Cedar Pocket	
Black Rock	27.49	44.24	27	Black Rock Road	
	29.43	47.36		I-15 north (Veterans Memorial Highway) – Salt Lake City	Continuation into Utah
1.000 mi = 1.609 km; 1.000 km = 0.621 mi

== See also ==
Interstate 15
Previous state: Nevada	Arizona	Next state: Utah
