= Virgin River Gorge =

Virgin River landform in southern Utah and northwest Arizona

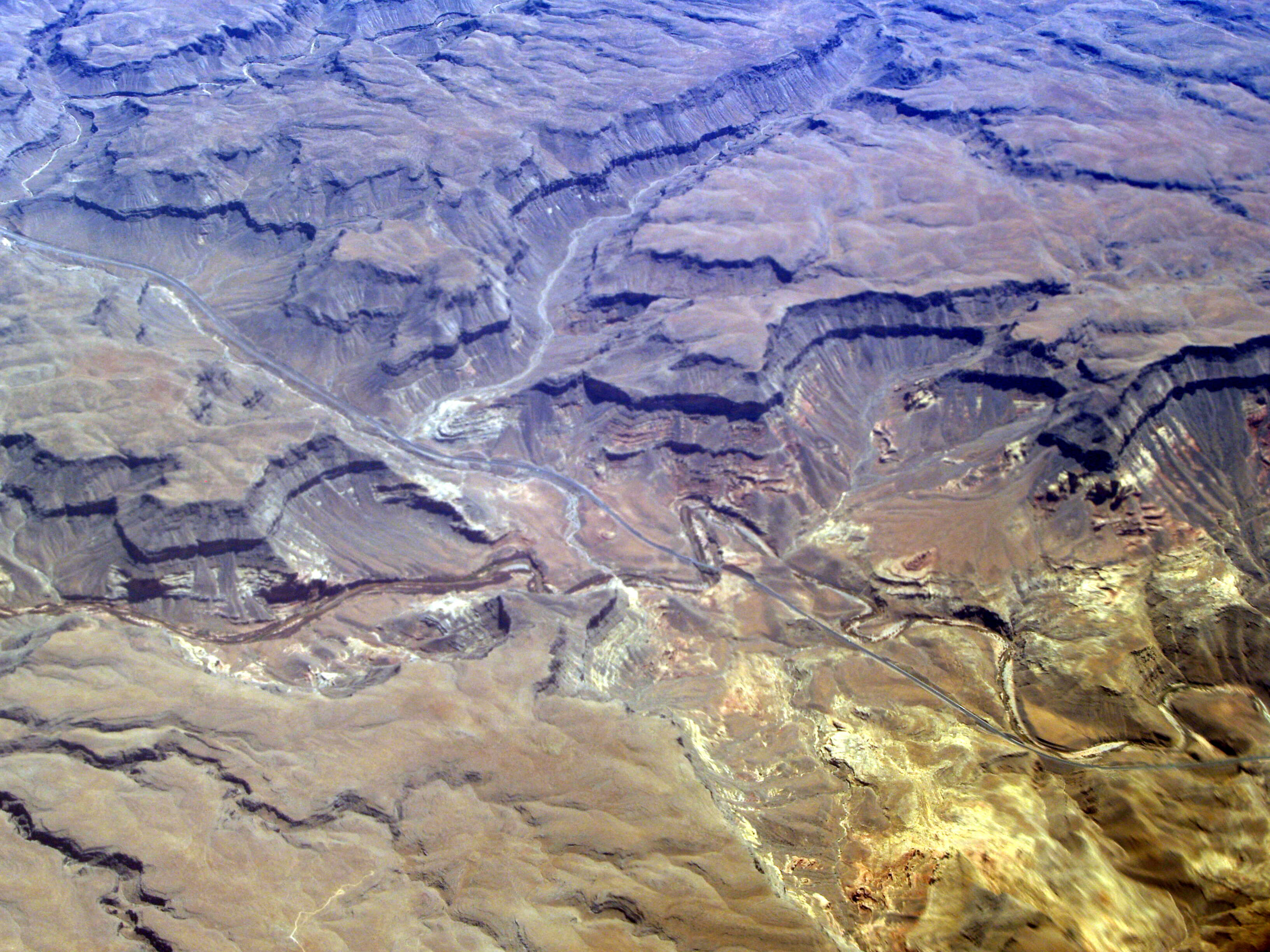
- Virgin River Gorge as seen from 20,000 feet.
- Floor elevation: 2,000 to 2,800 feet (600 to 900 m)

Geography
- Coordinates: 36°55′15″N 113°51′33″W
- Traversed by: I-15
- Interactive map of Virgin River Gorge

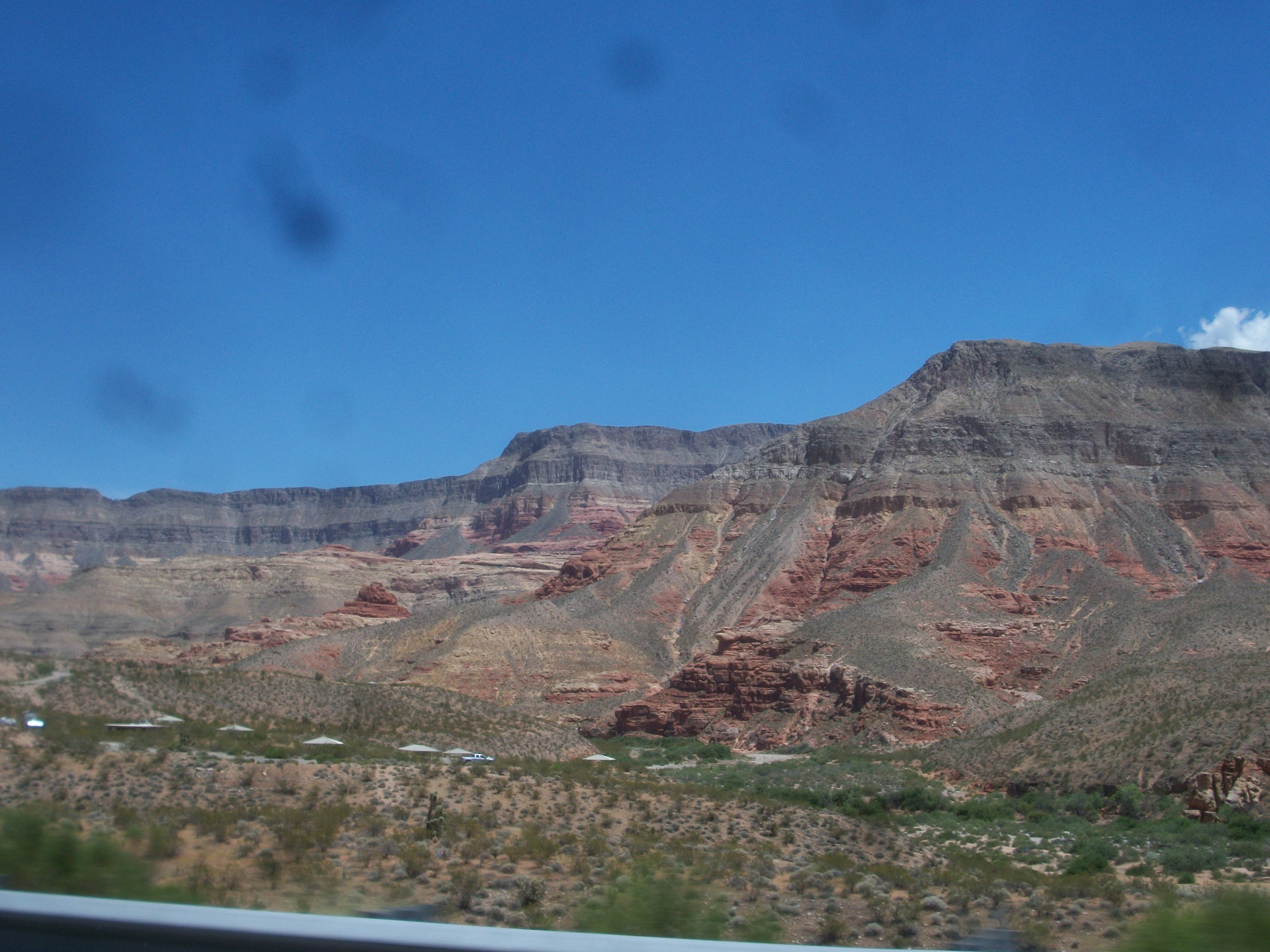
Formations in the gorge as observed from Interstate 15.

The Virgin River Gorge, located between St. George, Utah, and Beaver Dam, Arizona, is a long canyon carved out by the Virgin River in northwest Arizona. The Virgin River created the topography of both Zion National Park and the Virgin River Gorge.

Interstate 15 runs through the canyon and crosses the Virgin River several times. The Virgin River Gorge section of Interstate 15 is one of the most expensive sections of Interstate highway ever constructed. Due to the winding of the canyon, the highway within is also noted for its tricky driving conditions.

The canyon's climate is typical for the Mojave Desert, with hot summers and mild winters. Flora and fauna in the canyon are also typical of the Mojave. The canyon is popular among rock climbers, hikers, and campers. In 1997, American rock climber Chris Sharma climbed America's first-ever 8c+ (5.14c) graded sport climbing route, in the Virgin River Gorge, and called it Necessary Evil.

== See also ==
- Beaver Dam Mountains Wilderness
- Paiute Wilderness
- Yellow Knolls
