= Warm Springs Wilderness =

Protected area in Mohave County, Arizona

- IUCN category Ib (wilderness area)
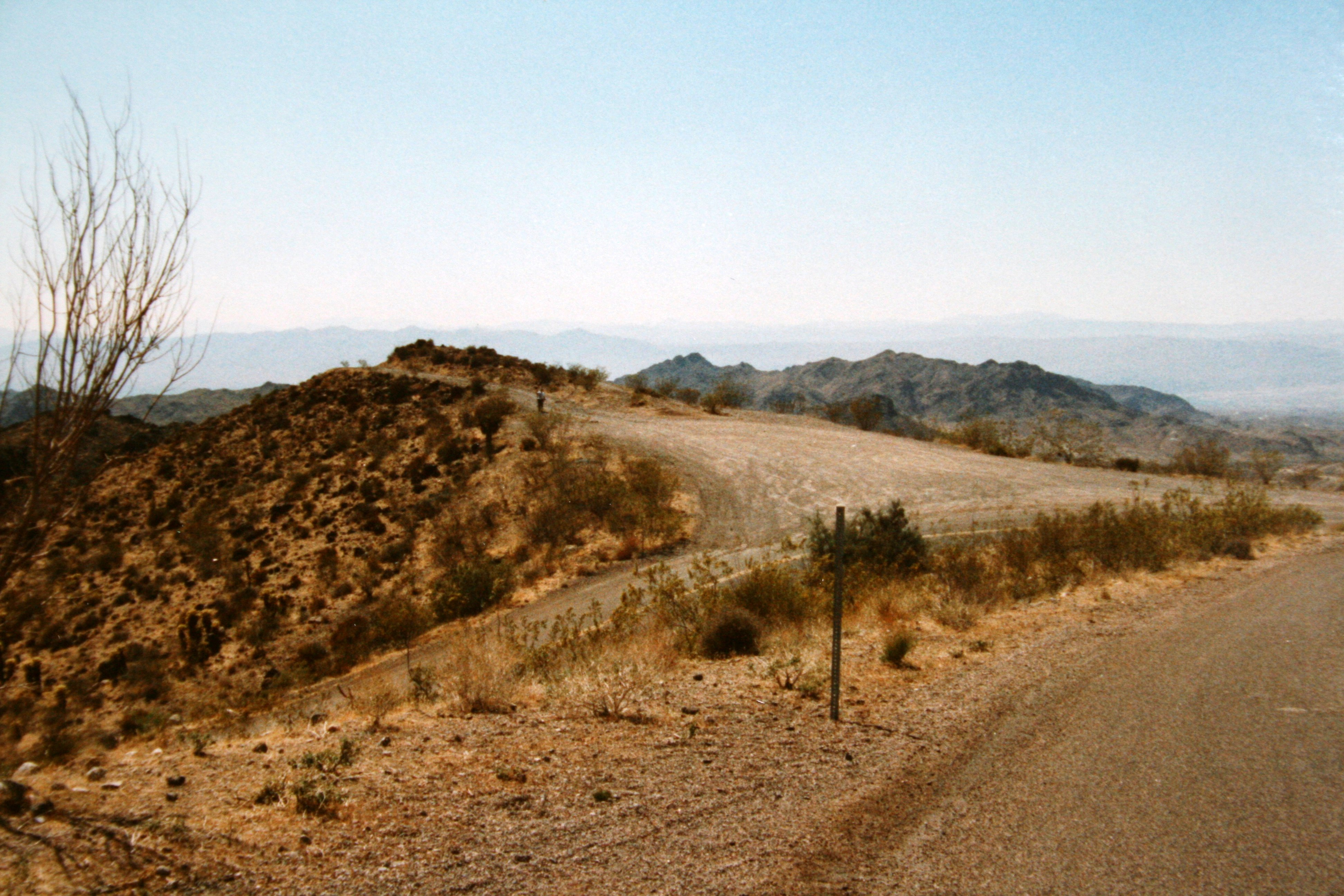
- Sitgreaves Pass
- Interactive map of Warm Springs Wilderness
- Location: Mohave County, Arizona
- Nearest city: Oatman, AZ–Yucca, AZ (Kingman, Bullhead City, Needles, CA)
- Coordinates: 34°53.80′N 114°18.48′W
- Area: 112,400-acre (45,500 ha)
- Established: 1990

The 112,400-acre (45,500 ha) Warm Springs Wilderness makes up the entirety of the Black Mesa (western Arizona) and parts of the surrounding foothills, washes, alluvial fans, and valleys. The Black Mesa is the southernmost section of the Black Mountains of western Mohave County, in northwest Arizona. The region is in the east and southeast of the Mojave Desert of Arizona, southern Nevada, and California.

The wilderness is 30 miles (48 km) southwest of Kingman, Arizona and 10 mi (16 km) east of Mohave Valley, Arizona and Needles, California. Oatman, AZ lies on its northwest perimeter, adjacent to the Boundary Cone landmark; Yucca, AZ is on its east in the south-central Sacramento Valley on Interstate 40 in Arizona which traverses due-south from Kingman, then turns due west of the Black Mesa and Warm Springs Wilderness perimeter to meet Needles, California, on the Colorado River.

The wilderness is one of the many wilderness areas located in the Lower Colorado River Valley. The Mount Nutt Wilderness is adjacent north across Sitgreaves Pass, just east of Oatman.

== Description ==
The wilderness covers the 10 mi long mesa, the stretch of the southern Black Mountains, about 3,600 feet (1,097 m) in elevation, and the mesa is bisected by a central southwest-flowing wash, a tributary of the Sacramento Wash, that flows into Topock Marsh at the Colorado River.

The wilderness has volcanic plugs to the north in the Mount Nutt Wilderness. One example offset on the Warm Springs border northwest, 4 mi (6.4 km)4 mi south of Oatman, Arizona is Boundary Cone, a major landmark in Mohave Valley's northeast.

The various springs located on the mesa's perimeter are highest in water volume following wet winters, or periods of high summer monsoonal weather.

== Flora and fauna ==
One of the major fauna elements is the Desert Bighorn Sheep.

== See also ==
- List of U.S. Wilderness Areas
- List of Arizona Wilderness Areas
- Wilderness Act
- Black Mountains (Arizona)
- Boundary Cone
- Mohave & Sacramento Valleys
