= Black Mesa =

Black Mesa may refer to:

== Places in the United States ==
- Black Mesa (Oklahoma, Colorado, New Mexico), in Colorado, New Mexico, and the highest point in Oklahoma
- Black Mesa Test Range, a United States Army rocket testing facility in Utah
- Black Mesa (Apache-Navajo Counties, Arizona), an upland coal-bearing mesa, mountainous area in Navajo and Apache Counties, Arizona
  - Black Mesa Peabody Coal controversy, the controversy surrounding a Peabody Coal mine in the Black Mesa (Apache-Navajo Counties, Arizona)
- Black Mesa (Navajo County, Arizona), in the White Mountains
- Black Mesa (Warm Springs, Arizona), a southern section of Black Mountains (Arizona) containing the Warm Springs Wilderness, and setting for the 1936 film The Petrified Forest

== In the Half-Life video game series ==
- Black Mesa Research Facility, a fictional scientific research complex in New Mexico that forms the setting for the video game Half-Life and the game with the same name.
- Black Mesa East, a fictional resistance base in Eastern Europe, featured in Half-Life 2
- Black Mesa (video game), a fan-made remake of the video game Half-Life

== See also ==
- List of peaks named Black Mesa, a comprehensive listing of summits named "Black Mesa"
