= Mohave Valley =

Landform along the Colorado River in Arizona

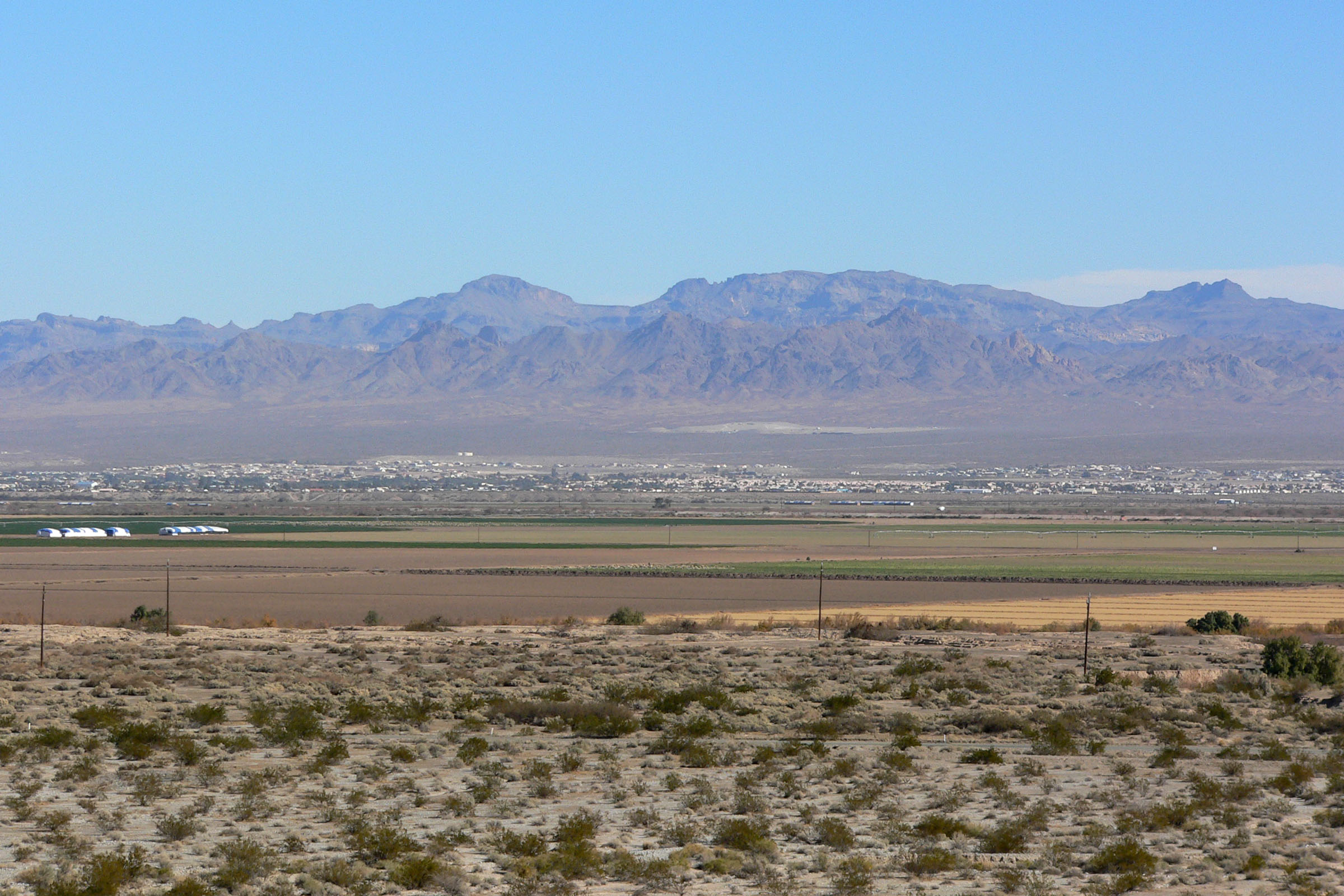
- Mohave Valley, looking east from California with the Black Mountains of Arizona in the distance

- Location within Arizona
- Length: 25 mi (40 km)
- Width: 10 mi (16 km)

Geography
- Location: Arizona/Nevada/California; Lower Colorado River Valley (southeast)-Mojave Desert ((northwest)-Sonoran Desert)
- Borders on: Colorado River-W; Black Mesa (western Arizona)-E; Black Mountains (Arizona)-NE; Mohave Mountains-S; Newberry Mountains (Nevada)-NW; Dead Mountains-W & NW; Sacramento Mountains (California)-SW
- Coordinates: 34°57′25″N 114°35′5″W
- Interactive map of Mohave Valley

The Mohave Valley is a valley located mostly on the east shore of the south-flowing Colorado River in northwest Arizona. The valley extends into California's San Bernardino County; the northern side of the valley extends into extreme southeast Clark County, Nevada. The main part of the valley lies in southwest Mohave County, Arizona and is at the intersection of the southeast Mojave and northwest Sonoran deserts.

The valley extends into the three states of California, Arizona and Nevada, and the Fort Mojave Indian Reservation extends into them as well. On the west, the valley borders the Dead Mountains of California which overlook the tri-state intersection point.

Needles on Interstate 40 lies on the southwest margin of the valley overlooking the Havasu National Wildlife Refuge and Topock Marsh. The village of Topock is located at the south end of the valley where the Chemehuevi Mountains of California restrict the Colorado to the narrow Mohave Canyon.

== Mohave Valley ==
Mohave Valley is a 25-mile (40 km) long, north-south trending valley and up to 10 miles (16 km) wide at some areas. Mohave Valley, Arizona, in the center of the reservation, is at the center point of the valley. Bullhead City is at the northern perimeter of the valley; Needles is on the southwest border of the valley in California. Downstream, and southeast, near the southern valley perimeter is the Topock Marsh in Arizona, and also on the southern perimeter, Interstate 40 in Arizona as it ascends uphill out of the Sacramento Wash, and eventually enters the entire north-south Sacramento Valley which lies on the east, southeast, and partial south of the Black Mountains.

Mohave Valley, Arizona, town center of the reservation, is located at 34°57′25″N 114°35′5″W; the town center is at the valleys center, and slightly west, closer to the Colorado River, the valley's west perimeter in many parts. The Boundary Cone landmark, lies east, at the northwest perimeter of the Black Mesa (western Arizona), a subsection mountain region at the southern end of the Black Mountains.

== Water and watersheds ==
=== Arizona, southeast & east-(Sacramento Wash & Valley) ===
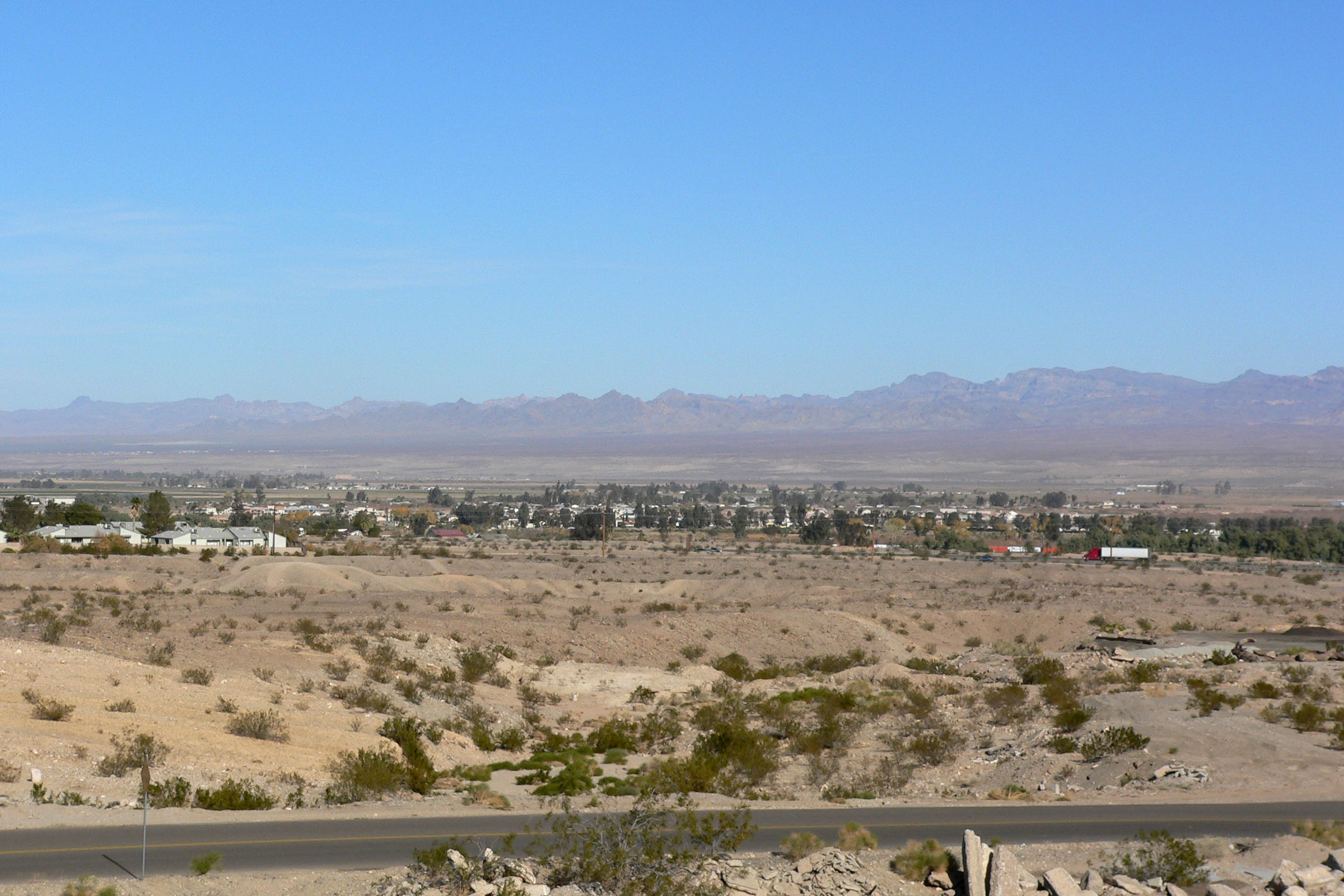
View east-northeast of Needles, Mohave Valley, & Black Mountains (Arizona)

The southern end of the valley begins elevated regions, with the Mohave Mountains directly south, and Dutch Flat, east of the Mohave Mountains, which drains northwest into Sacramento Wash. The southeast of the valley meets the outfall of Sacramento Wash, and associated drainage plains; Sacramento Valley itself is mostly east and south of the Black Mesa section at the south of the Black Mountains (Arizona); the Sacramento Wash turns due west, and follows Interstate 40 in Arizona as it turns west and parallels the wash to meet Needles at the Colorado River; it is also the southern drainage outfall point into the Topock Marsh, at Topock, eastern shore of the Colorado River, in the southeast valley. Other washes drain through the eastern Mohave Valley plains and foothills into the Topock Marsh from the southwest of the Black Mountains, the extensive range which goes north 75 miles (121 km) to Lake Mead.

=== Nevada, Piute Wash & Valley-(northwest) ===
While in Arizona the Sacramento Wash drains the Sacramento Valley southwest of Kingman, in Nevada the Piute Wash drains the Piute Valley of southeast Nevada. A separate drainage lies between them on the Colorado River, the Havasu-Mohave Lakes Drainage. These three drainages, the west, center, and east all drain into the Mohave Valley region.

== See also ==
- Boundary Cone
