= List of peaks named Black Mesa =

Black Mesa may refer to:

- A summit in Antarctica:
  - Black Mesa (Antarctica)
- One of 41 summits in the United States:

Name	USGS link	State	County	USGS map	Coordinates	Elevation	
Black Mesa		Arizona	Apache	Sweathouse Peak	36°16′30″N 109°52′02″W	7,070 ft	2,150 m
Black Mesa		Arizona	Coconino	Gray Mountain	35°40′14″N 111°26′53″W	5,272 ft	1,607 m
Black Mesa		Arizona	Gila	Natural Corral	33°28′46″N 110°22′46″W	4,104 ft	1,251 m
Black Mesa		Arizona	Gila	Beckers Butte	33°51′29″N 110°26′45″W	5,820 ft	1,770 m
Black Mesa		Arizona	Gila	Meddler Wash	33°38′51″N 110°53′26″W	4,337 ft	1,322 m
Black Mesa		Arizona	Gila	Buckhead Mesa	34°18′36″N 111°22′43″W	5,295 ft	1,614 m
Black Mesa		Arizona	Graham	Park Creek Cabins	33°13′07″N 109°43′27″W	6,184 ft	1,885 m
Black Mesa		Arizona	La Paz	Crystal Hill	33°35′56″N 114°01′19″W	3,612 ft	1,101 m
Black Mesa		Arizona	Maricopa	Goldfield	33°28′26″N 111°24′31″W	2,838 ft	865 m
Black Mesa		Arizona	Maricopa	Adams Mesa	33°43′37″N 111°35′24″W	2,995 ft	913 m
Black Mesa		Arizona	Maricopa	Boulder Mountain	33°49′48″N 111°29′17″W	3,802 ft	1,159 m
Black Mesa		Arizona	Maricopa	New River Mesa	33°55′25″N 111°58′45″W	4,692 ft	1,430 m
Black Mesa		Arizona	Mohave	Signal	34°23′00″N 113°40′03″W	2,726 ft	831 m
Black Mesa		Arizona	Mohave	Warm Springs	34°57′09″N 114°19′38″W	3,835 ft	1,169 m
Black Mesa		Arizona	Mohave	Centennial Wash	34°16′51″N 113°50′19″W	1,686 ft	514 m
Black Mesa		Arizona	Mohave	Music Mountains SE	35°34′34″N 113°45′40″W	5,669 ft	1,728 m
Black Mesa		Arizona	Navajo	Taylor	34°23′13″N 110°04′41″W	6,115 ft	1,864 m
Black Mesa		Arizona	Pima	Cumero Mountain	31°29′49″N 111°22′35″W	4,626 ft	1,410 m
Black Mesa		Arizona	Yavapai	Joes Hill	34°11′14″N 112°06′47″W	3,550 ft	1,080 m
Black Mesa		Arizona	Yavapai	Bagdad	34°36′26″N 113°12′43″W	3,688 ft	1,124 m
Black Mesa		Colorado	Dolores	Groundhog Mountain	37°47′44″N 108°12′05″W	11,338 ft	3,456 m
Black Mesa		Colorado	Gunnison	Mount Guero	38°37′58″N 107°23′47″W	11,106 ft	3,385 m
Black Mesa		Colorado	Las Animas	Dennis Canyon	37°04′53″N 103°20′47″W	5,705 ft	1,739 m
Black Mesa		Idaho	Elmore	Pasadena Valley	42°54′29″N 115°12′15″W	3,077 ft	938 m
Black Mesa		New Mexico	Bernalillo	Isleta	34°56′45″N 106°42′03″W	5,023 ft	1,531 m
Black Mesa		New Mexico	Colfax	Hunter Mesa	36°48′52″N 104°22′10″W	6,762 ft	2,061 m
Black Mesa		New Mexico	Cibola	Cerro Verde	34°48′51″N 107°16′30″W	6,542 ft	1,994 m
Black Mesa		New Mexico	Cibola	Grants	35°10′47″N 107°52′05″W	7,175 ft	2,187 m
Black Mesa		New Mexico	Doña Ana	Black Mesa	32°10′27″N 106°46′29″W	4,098 ft	1,249 m
Black Mesa		New Mexico	Mora	Fort Union	35°59′54″N 105°06′13″W	7,772 ft	2,369 m
Black Mesa		New Mexico	Rio Arriba	Lyden	36°08′52″N 106°04′25″W	6,863 ft	2,092 m
Black Mesa		New Mexico	Sandoval	Laguna Seca	35°25′22″N 107°15′23″W	8,005 ft	2,440 m
Black Mesa		New Mexico	Santa Fe	Espanola	35°55′18″N 106°06′27″W	6,092 ft	1,857 m
Black Mesa		New Mexico	Socorro	Sierra Larga North	34°13′41″N 106°37′08″W	6,106 ft	1,861 m
Black Mesa		New Mexico	Union	Wedding Cake Butte	36°59′50″N 103°08′02″W	5,239 ft	1,597 m
Black Mesa		New Mexico	Valencia	South Garcia	34°53′38″N 107°05′27″W	5,430 ft	1,660 m
Black Mesa		Nevada	Clark	Government Wash	36°09′23″N 114°45′56″W	2,201 ft	671 m
Black Mesa		Texas	Brewster	Cerro Castellan	29°12′42″N 103°29′23″W	2,736 ft	834 m
Black Mesa		Texas	Brewster	Amarilla Mountain	29°20′57″N 103°43′21″W	4,278 ft	1,304 m
Black Mesa		Utah	San Juan	No-Mans Island	37°29′26″N 109°35′06″W	5,574 ft	1,699 m
Black Mesa		Utah	Garfield	Cass Creek Peak	37°53′40″N 110°37′31″W	6,562 ft	2,000 m

== See also ==
- Black Mesa (Oklahoma, Colorado, New Mexico)
