= Broken Rainbow (film) =

- DVD cover
- Directed by: Victoria Mudd
- Produced by: Maria Florio; Victoria Mudd
- Starring: Laura Nyro; Buffy Sainte-Marie
- Narrated by: Martin Sheen
- Cinematography: Baird Bryant; Frederick Elmes; Victoria Mudd; Tony St. John; Joan Weidman
- Edited by: Joanne D'Antonio; Maria Florio; Victoria Mudd; Vivien Hillgrove
- Music by: Laura Nyro
- Distributed by: Earthworks Films
- Release date: 1985
- Running time: 70 minutes
- Country: United States
- Languages: English; Navajo

Broken Rainbow is a 1985 American documentary film by Victoria Mudd and Maria Florio.

== Summary ==
The film is about the history of Navajo Native Americans, focusing on the government enforced relocation of thousands from Black Mesa in Arizona after the 1974 Navajo-Hopi Land Settlement Act. According to the film, the Navajo were relocated to aid mining speculation in a process that began in 1964. The film is narrated by Martin Sheen. The title song was written by Laura Nyro, the theme music was composed by Paul Apodaca, with other original music by Rick Krizman and Fred Myrow.

== Accolades ==
It won the Academy Award for Best Documentary Feature at the 58th Academy Awards.

== See also ==
- Black Mesa Peabody Coal controversy
- Wounded Knee incident
- American Indian Movement
