= Toasty Digital =

- Born: 1994 (age 31–32); Minneapolis, Minnesota
- Genres: Mashup, Hip hop, electronic
- Years active: 2020-present

Toasty Digital (born 1994) is an American musician and mashup artist. His first notable release was 2049, a mashup concept album created through sampling various Kanye West tracks. He rose to further prominence with the release of Good Kid Twisted Fantasy, a mixtape sampling Kanye and Kendrick Lamar.

== Early life and career ==
Toasty Digital was born in Minneapolis, Minnesota. He began teaching himself how to make and mix music at the age of 12 using GarageBand. His job outside of music is technical editing.

=== 2020: 2049 a. Maybe We Can Make It To Christmas ===
In 2020, he released 2049, a concept album made with mashups of various Kanye West songs both released and unreleased. Notably, Toasty Digital sampled leaked songs from West's cancelled album Yandhi. 2049 featured a backstory and an interactive website to promote the release. The website was designed by starfennec and features, alongside the songs from the album, information about climate change with hyperlinks to various websites, including the Climate Justice Alliance and the Indigenous Environmental Network. The relevance of these links are in the backstory, which explains that the album is set on a futuristic Earth, where Kanye West has disappeared and humanity has been overwhelmed by climate change. The album was well received, and Toasty Digital attributed much of his early success to the subreddit "YandhiLeaks", explaining that it helped spread the album to a wider audience.

In late 2020, Toasty Digital released a Christmas-themed mashup album titled Maybe We Can Make It To Christmas, again influenced by Kanye West samples.

=== 2021-present: Later Mixtapes ===
In February 2021, Toasty Digital released the mixtape Good Kid Twisted Fantasy. This release features samples from Kanye West and Kendrick Lamar, with the title being a homage to their respective albums My Beautiful Dark Twisted Fantasy and Good Kid, M.A.A.D City. The mixtape continues the story of 2049, being set one year later as humans plan to evacuate the Earth. A 63-year old Kendrick Lamar would have heard the album before being put into cryogenic sleep for the duration of the six-year trip. Toasty Digital would also release DIET YEEZUS, a mashup album of Kanye West's album, Yeezus, featuring what he describes as a "plant-based, cruelty-free" sound. Toasty also made the first volume of ‘Tyler 2049’, a collection of songs made from different parts of other songs from Tyler the Creator in November 2021. Tyler 2049 (vol. 1) is a spinoff to 2049, being set in the same setting and year, but following the compositions of an AI Okonma. Toasty Digital's next mashup project, BLONDA, featured samples from Frank Ocean's Blonde) and Kanye West's Donda. It was slated for release in 2021, but was pushed back to February 2022. It takes place one year after Good Kid Twisted Fantasy in 2051, where Kanye returns to Earth. He then travels to Antarctica to find a 64-year-old Frank Ocean operating the last radio station on Earth. After both have visions from a parallel universe, they produce the mixtape BLONDA. Toasty Digital's most recent album, Sample Service, is another compilation of remixed Kanye West tracks. Toasty Digital has also expressed interest in performing live and has practiced recreating his songs live using a drum machine.

On October 11, 2022, Toasty announced his departure from using West samples in his mashups, as they were becoming less fun to make and he wanted to focus on other artists. He also announced a sequel to Maybe We Can Make It To Christmas. On November 15, 2022, the album title was revealed as Instrumentals from my mama's Christmas Party. It is set to primarily feature samples from Kendrick Lamar and will debut on November 25.

== Discography ==
=== Albums ===
- 2049 (2020)
- SAMPLE SERVICE (2022)

=== Mixtapes ===
- MAYBE WE CAN MAKE IT TO CHRISTMAS (2020)
- Good Kid Twisted Fantasy (2021)
- DIET YEEZUS (2021)
- Tyler 2049 (vol. 1) (2021)
- DIET YEEZUS DELUXE (2022)
- BLONDA (2022)
- Instrumentals from my mama's Christmas Party (2022)
- The Forever Young Tour (2023)
- The Lost Tour (2023)
- VULTURES 2049 (2024)
- BULLIES (2025)
