= Sacramento Wash =

Waterbody in Mohave County, Arizona

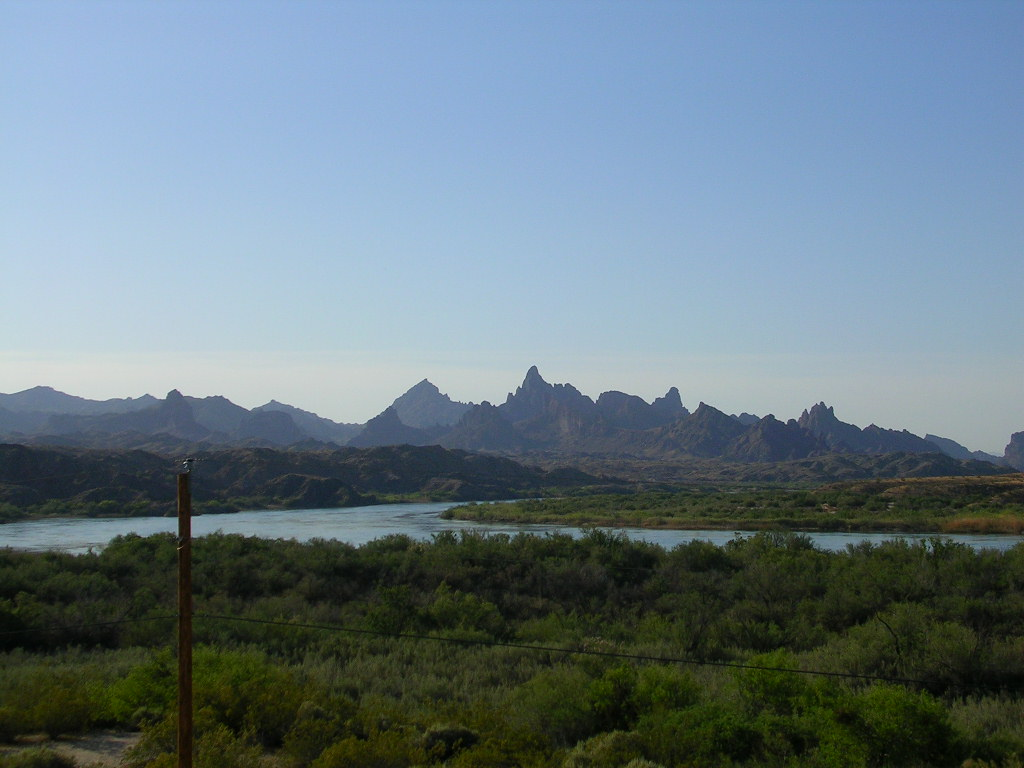
- Topock Marsh; Outfall region of the Sacramento Wash

- Sacramento Wash in the Sacramento Valley of Arizona

Location
- Country: United States
- State: Arizona
- Region: (southeast)-Mojave Desert
- District: Mohave County, Arizona
- City: Yucca, Arizona; Golden Valley, Arizona-(north)

Physical characteristics
- Length: 50 mi (80 km), N-S, then W-(for 20 mi))

The Sacramento Wash is a major drainage of northwest Arizona in Mohave County. The wash is east of the Black Canyon of the Colorado and drains into the south-flowing Colorado River 45 mi south of Lake Mohave, and 90 mi south of Hoover Dam at Lake Mead. The wash outfall is in the center-south of the Havasu-Mohave Lakes Watershed. An equivalent wash drains to the west of the Colorado River and the Black Canyon, draining southeast Nevada and a small part of California, the Piute Wash of the Piute Valley. The Piute Wash outfall is upstream of the Sacramento's outfall by about 15 miles.

Both Piute and Sacramento Washes are ephemeral desert washes which may only have standing water in mountainous canyon tributaries, or in periods of extensive rainfall and cooler weather. Much of the water is also simply infiltrated into groundwater basins. Only one tributary to Sacramento Wash is an intermittent stream, Sawmill Canyon in the northeast region of the Sacramento Valley.

The wash drains the Sacramento Valley, and the valley is bordered on the west by the Black Mountains (Arizona), and Interstate 40 in Arizona traverses south from Kingman and goes west around the south end of the mountains, a section called the Black Mesa (western Arizona). I-40 joins the central section of the wash proper at Yucca, Arizona and the interstate follows the valley and wash west to meet the Colorado River at Needles. The drainage to the north of the Havasu-Mohave Lakes Watershed with the Sacramento Wash Drainage is the Lake Mead Watershed. The Detrital Valley bordering Sacramento Valley and Wash north and northwest of Kingman, is part of the southeast region of Lake Mead.

== Topock Marsh ==
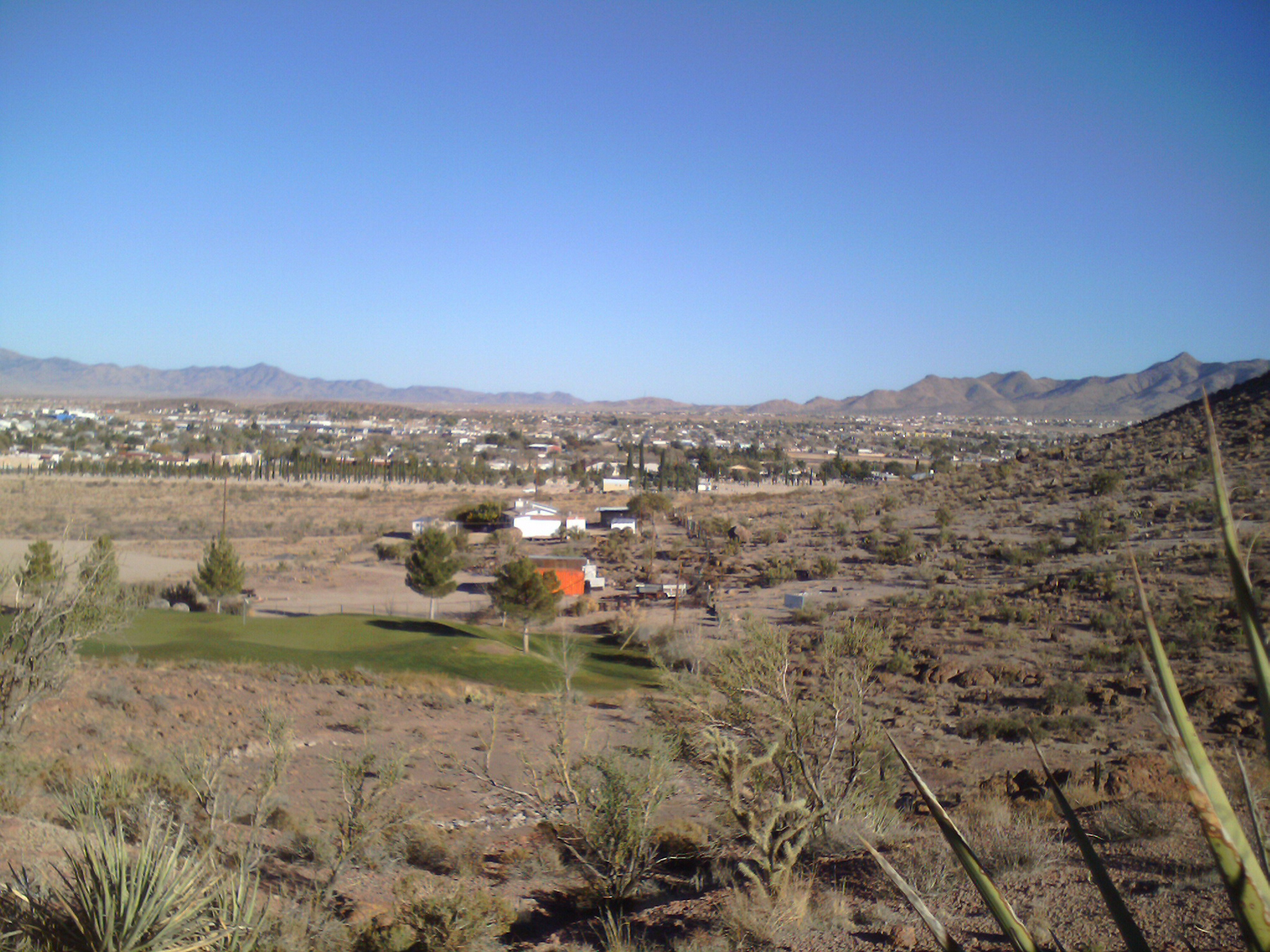
North section of Sacramento Valley, with townsite of Golden Valley

The confluence of the Sacramento Wash with the Colorado, occurs at the Topock Marsh in its southeast. The Topock Marsh has two interconnected sections, and the marsh is east of the main course of the Colorado River. It is a noted region for ecology, including birdwatching. The river section containing the marsh is the Havasu National Wildlife Refuge, about 25 miles long.

== Northwest Arizona, Bill Williams River ==
The entirety of northwest Arizona is drained as a single region flowing into regions of the Colorado River and Lake Mead's southeast quarter. The Sacramento Wash Watershed is bordered, and enclosed on the southeast and south by the Bill Williams River and its northern tributary, the Big Sandy River which drains the areas east of the Sacramento Valley. The Bill Williams flows due west to its confluence with the Colorado, as does the Sacramento Wash flows west. The Bill Williams is also a delimiting line separating the Mojave Desert to the north and northwest, and the Sonoran Desert south and southeast. The Colorado Desert is southwest, and is called a northwest extension of the Sonoran.
