= Boundary Cone =

Landform in Mohave County, Arizona, U.S.

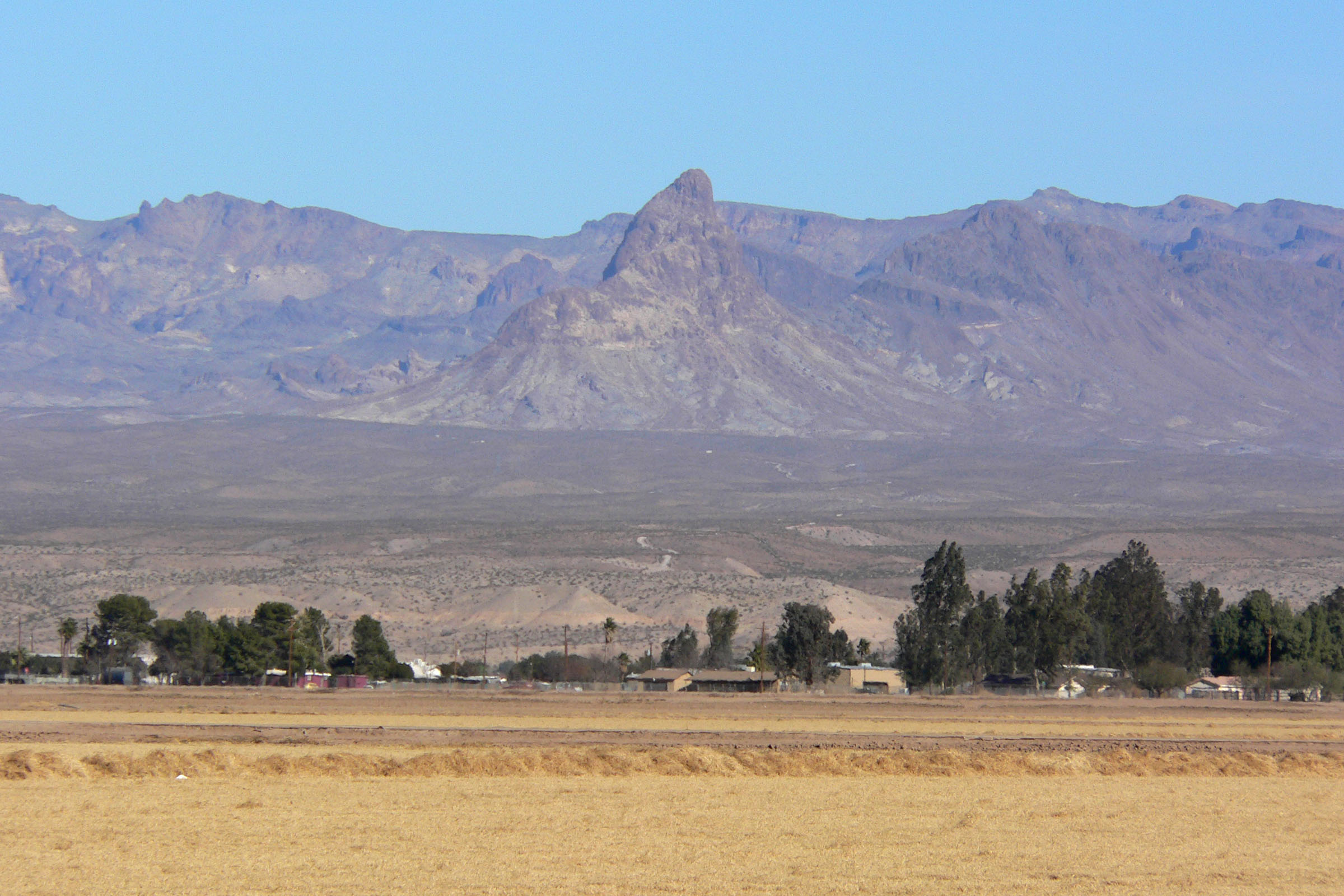
- View of Boundary Cone from Mohave Valley, on the Colorado River

Highest point
- Elevation: 3,432 ft (1,046 m) NAVD 88
- Prominence: 750 ft (229 m)
- Coordinates: 34°59′02″N 114°24′56″W

Geography
- Location within Arizona Location within the United States
- Location: Mohave County, Arizona, U.S
- Parent range: Black Mountains
- Topo map: USGS Boundary Cone

Geology
- Mountain type: volcanic neck

Climbing
- Easiest route: from Oatman, Arizona

Boundary Cone is a geologic promontory located in the western foothills of the Black Mountains in Mohave County, Arizona. The peak is to the east of the Mohave Valley, northeast of Needles, California, and southeast of Bullhead City. The peak is about 4 miles (6 km) southwest of the mountain community of Oatman and 12 miles (19 km) east of the Colorado River.

== History ==
Several Indigenous peoples attach religious and cultural significance to Boundary Cone as well as much of the surrounding landscape. In March 2006, the Bureau of Land Management determined and the Arizona State Historic Preservation Office concurred that Boundary Cone is eligible for inclusion on the National Register of Historic Places as a property of traditional, religious, and cultural importance to several Indigenous tribes.

Boundary Cone was a prominent landmark for early travelers in this region.

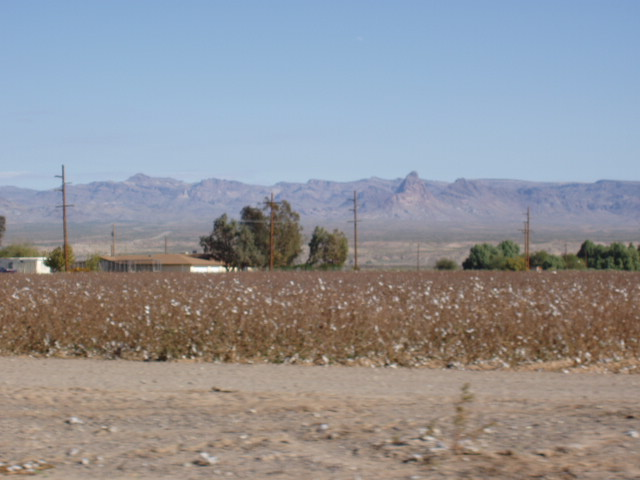
Fort Mojave Indian Reservation, with Boundary Cone in distance

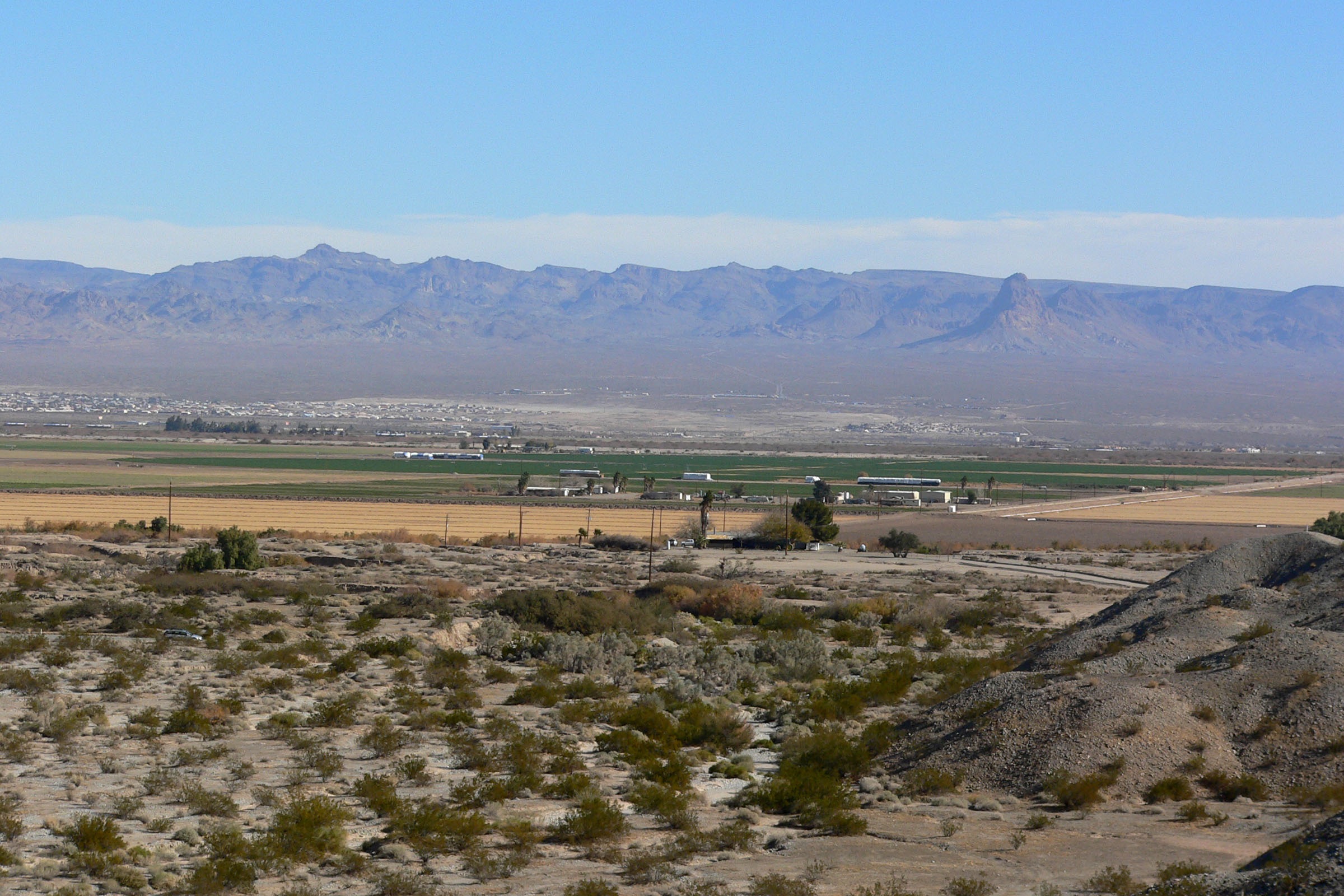
Mohave Valley, with Boundary Cone at right
