= Black Mesa (Warm Springs, Arizona) =

Landform in Mohave County, Arizona, U.S.

Coordinates: 34°57′09″N 114°19′38″W

The Black Mesa (Warm Springs, Arizona) of northwestern Arizona is the extreme southern section of the Black Mountains.

It is a notable mountain section, since the entire Warm Springs Wilderness comprises the entire mesa. It is separated to the north from the Black Hills range by a canyon and road. The north side of the canyon is the southern border of the adjacent Mount Nutt Wilderness, thus comprising a two-sectioned wilderness region.

The mesa is about 10 miles (16 km) long, north – south and about 1,000 feet (300 m) higher than the surrounding valleys to the east, south and west. Interstate 40 in Arizona runs along the valleys to the east and south of the Black Mesa, connecting Needles, California to Kingman. Yucca, Arizona lies in the Sacramento Valley just east of the mesa.

== See also ==
- Black Mesa, Arizona
