= Elephants Tooth =

Landform in Mohave County, Arizona

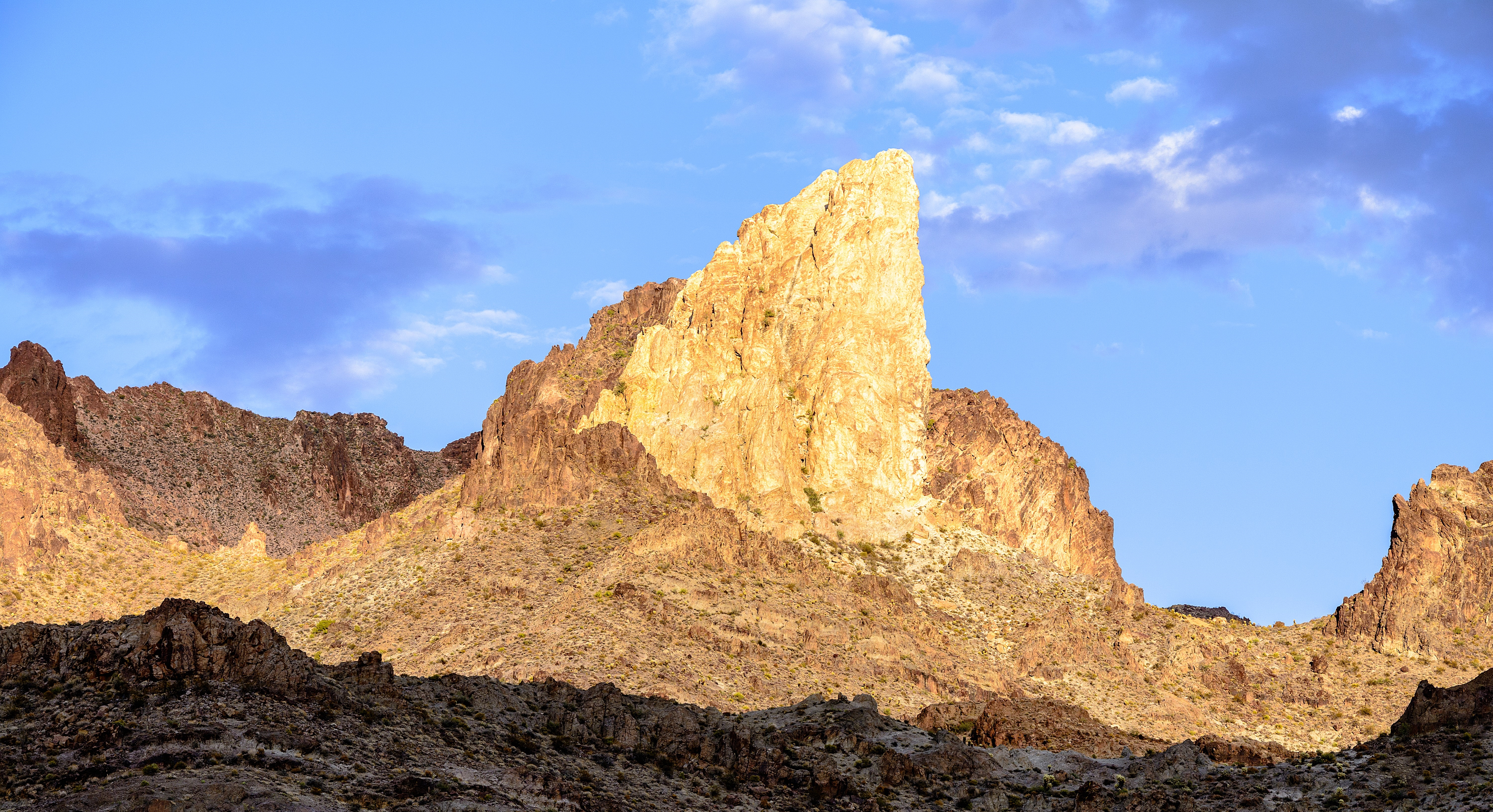
- East aspect

Highest point
- Elevation: 3,666 ft (1,117 m)
- Prominence: 266 ft (81 m)
- Parent peak: Peak 4421
- Isolation: 0.61 mi (0.98 km)
- Coordinates: 35°01′29″N 114°22′17″W

Geography
- Location within Arizona Location within the United States
- Country: United States
- State: Arizona
- County: Mohave
- Parent range: Black Mountains
- Topo map: USGS Mount Nutt

Geology
- Rock age: Miocene to Oligocene
- Mountain type: Volcanic plug
- Rock type: Rhyolite

Elephants Tooth is a 3,666-foot-elevation (1,117 m) pillar in Mohave County, Arizona, United States.

== Description ==
Elephants Tooth is situated in the Black Mountains, 0.7 mile east of the community of Oatman and rising nearly 1,000 feet above it. The landmark is a rhyolitic intrusion of Miocene to Oligocene age surrounded by darker rock of dacitic lava. This geological feature lies within the Colorado River drainage basin, with the river approximately 14 miles to the west. In 1902, Ben Taddock discovered gold flecks and nuggets in the vicinity of Elephants Tooth, and by 1907 the mine that sprang up there had produced $3 million. The toponym has been officially adopted by the U.S. Board on Geographic Names.

== Climate ==
According to the Köppen climate classification system, Elephants Tooth is located in the hot arid climate zone of the Mojave Desert. Temperatures above 100 °F (38 °C) are not uncommon during the summer months. In contrast, freezing temperatures and strong winds are not uncommon in the winter, as well as precipitation such as rain and snow. Annual average precipitation is two to six inches.

== Gallery ==
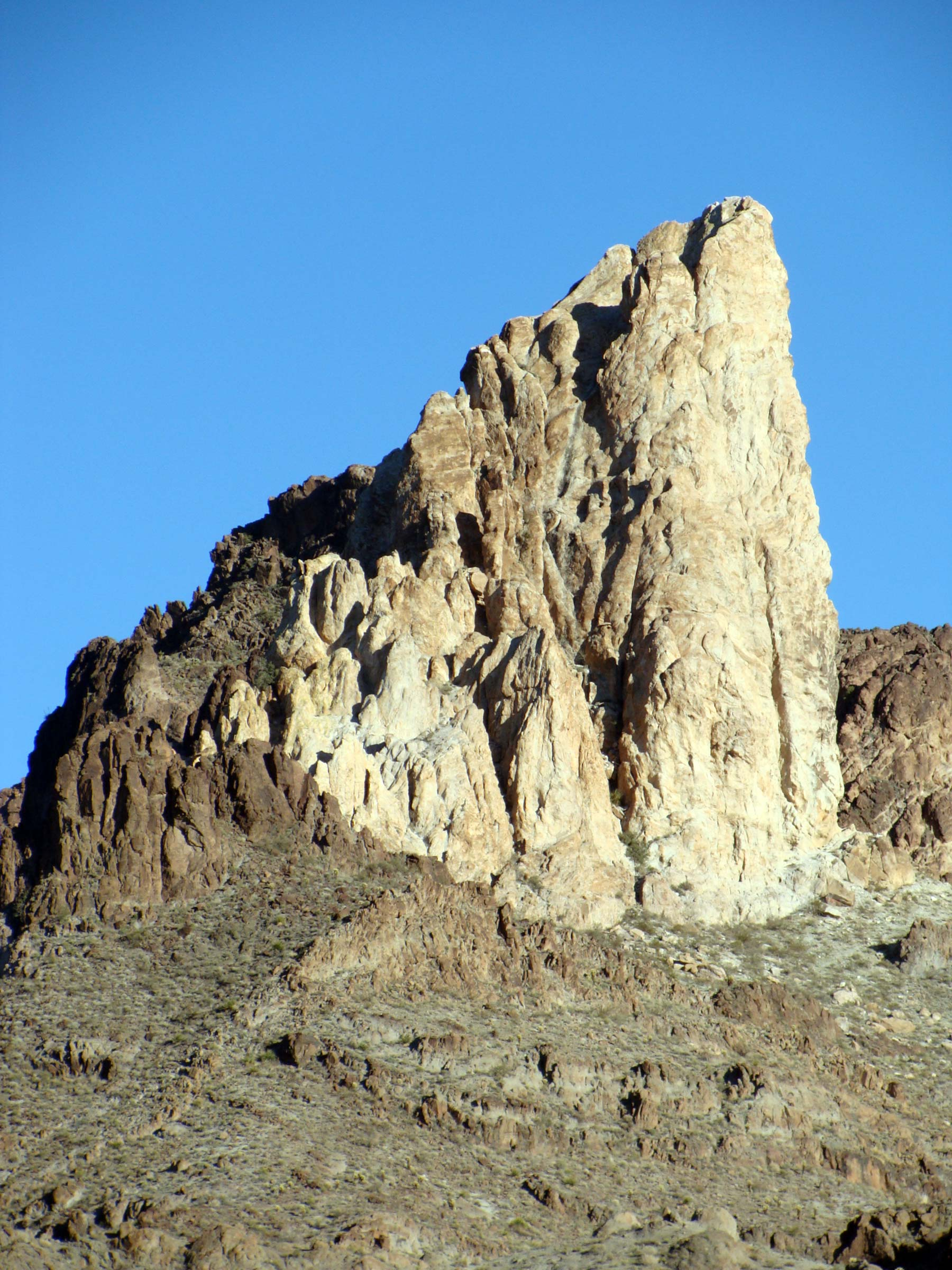

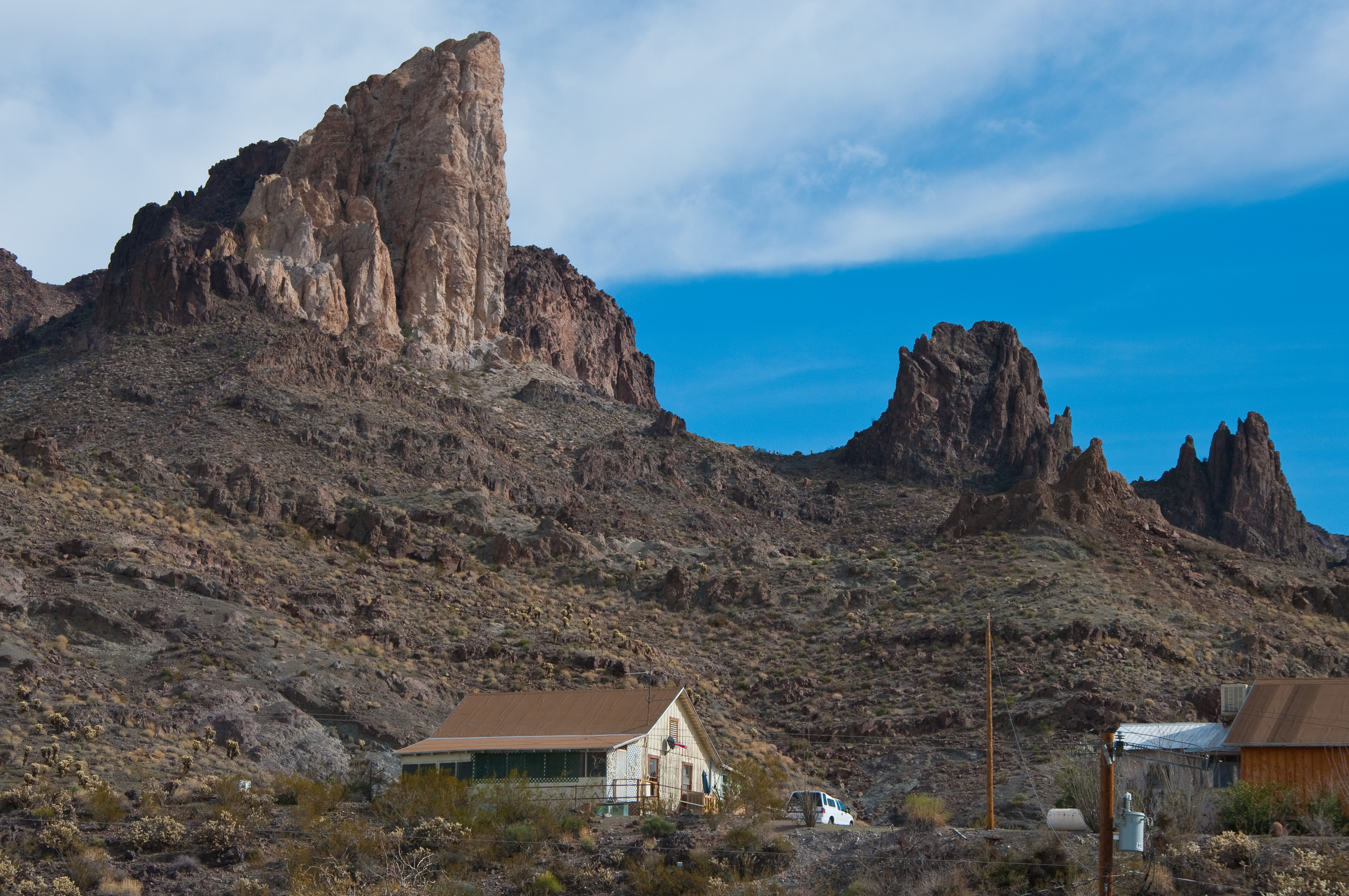

== See also ==
- List of mountains in the United States
