= Fortification Hill =

Landform in Mohave County, Arizona

Fortification Hill ( viewed from ~due west )
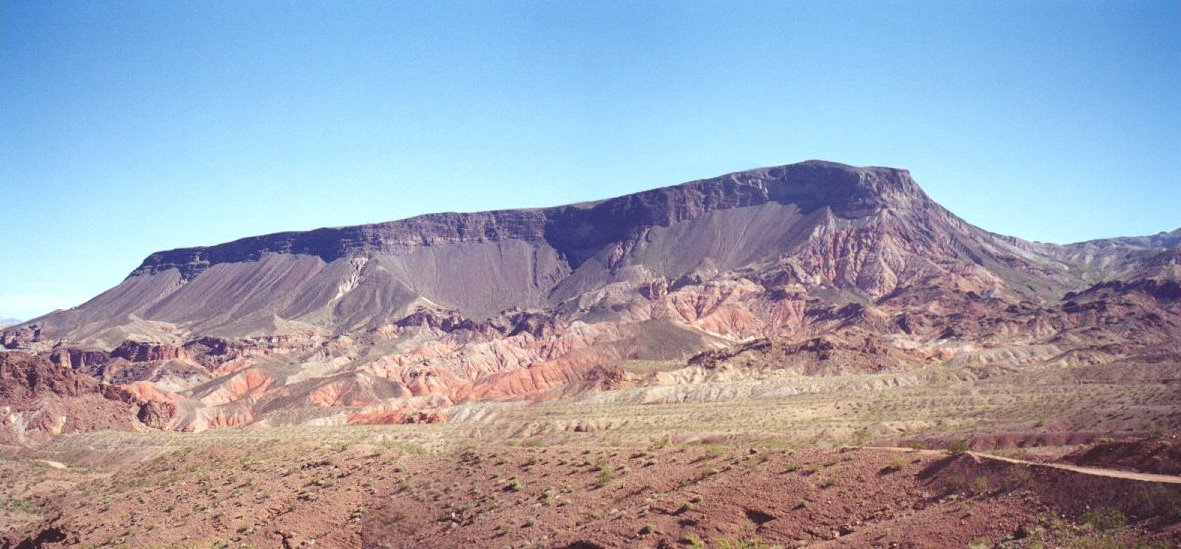

Highest point
- Elevation: 3,720 ft (1,134 m) NAVD 88
- Prominence: 863 ft (263 m)
- Coordinates: 36°02′40″N 114°40′52″W

Geography
- Location within Arizona
- Location: Mohave County, Arizona, U.S.
- Parent range: Black Mountains (Arizona)
- Topo map: USGS Hoover Dam

Fortification Hill is a prominence adjacent to Lake Mead in the Lake Mead National Recreation Area; it is located at the northwest terminus region of the Black Mountains (Arizona), and specifically the north region of the Black Mountains. It is near a southern section of Lake Mead, and just northeast of Hoover Dam. It can easily be seen eastward across Las Vegas Bay or from the two northern mountain terminuses of Eldorado Mountains (Nevada), or the Black Mountains (Arizona).

The mountain prominence is plateau-like, or mesa-like with its highpoint at the southeast terminus, and sloping north and northwestwards toward Lake Mead. The prominence is 3,719 feet (1,134 m).

The flat mountaintop, sloping northwards is composed of Tertiary basaltic lava flows.

== See also ==
- Black Mountains (Arizona)
- Eldorado Mountains
- List of mountains of Arizona by height
