= Yucca, Arizona =

Community in Mohave County, Arizona

- Census-designated place
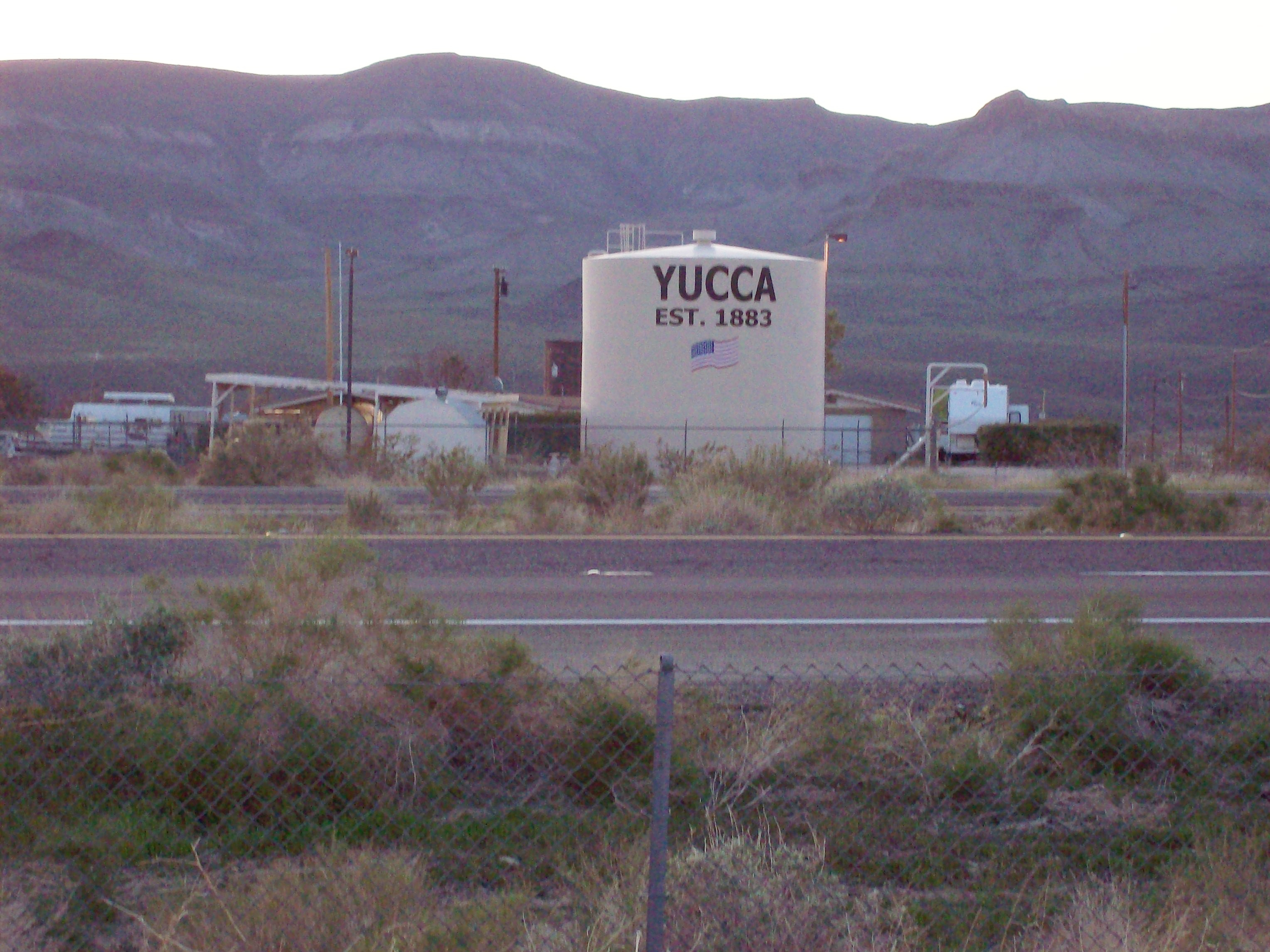
- Water tank in Yucca, Arizona

- Location within Arizona Location within the United States
- Coordinates: 34°51′46″N 114°08′40″W
- State: Arizona
- County: Mohave
- Founded: 1883

Area
  - Total: 2.24 sq mi (5.79 km^{2})
  - Land: 2.24 sq mi (5.79 km^{2})
  - Water: 0 sq mi (0.00 km^{2})
- Elevation: 1,821 ft (555 m)

Population (2020)
  - Total: 96
  - Density: 42.9/sq mi (16.57/km^{2})
- Time zone: MST
- ZIP code: 86438
- Area code: 928
- FIPS code: 04-85470
- GNIS feature ID: 2582912

Yucca is an unincorporated community and census-designated place (CDP) in Mohave County, Arizona, United States. As of the 2020 census it had a population of 96, down from 126 at the 2010 census.

Located along Interstate 40, it lies southwest of Kingman, just east of the southern section of the Black Mountains and west of the Hualapai and McCracken Mountains in the Sacramento Valley. Yucca has a ZIP Code of 86438. Students in Yucca attend elementary school in the one-school Yucca Elementary School District, and high school in the Kingman Unified School District.

== History ==
Yucca started as an order office and water fill station for the Atlantic and Pacific Railroad (affiliated with the Atchison, Topeka and Santa Fe Railway) in the 1880s. It was part of a rail line commissioned by the U.S. Congress running from St. Louis, Missouri, to Needles, California. This rail line grew to be transcontinental and is a major freight corridor to Southern California. In 1918 Yucca started its own cemetery.

During World War II, the United States Army Air Forces purchased 2,284 acres (9.24 km^{2}) of land and developed the Yucca Army Airfield for training pilots. In 1954 the air base was purchased by Ford Motor Company and along with additional land, was turned into the Arizona Proving Ground comprising nearly 4,000 acres (16 km^{2}). Chrysler purchased the proving grounds in November 2007 from Ford for $34.9 million.

Yucca became part of Route 66 in 1952 when the highway was realigned, bypassing Oatman, Arizona. This was the heyday for the small town when motels, cafés, and a Whiting Brothers truck stop operated. In the early 1970s, Interstate 40 replaced the section of Route 66 going through Yucca. The motels and truck stop went out of business as people used facilities in larger Kingman and Needles. A small general store/café, post office, automotive service center, real estate office, and bar were the only retail businesses remaining by 2008.

In 1997, a land exchange between the Santa Fe Railroad and the U.S. Government of approximately 70,000 acres (280 km^{2}) was completed just southwest of Yucca. Much of the land subsequently owned by the railroad was subdivided into typically 40-acre (160,000 m^{2}) parcels and offered to the general public as the Stage Coach Trails development. This land has primarily been purchased by individuals for residential use or long-term investment. Other smaller developments opened just north of Yucca in 2006. Over time these residential developments may spur renewed business growth in the area.

== Location and climate ==
Yucca is located in southern Mohave County, 35 miles (56 km) north of Lake Havasu City, 24 miles (39 km) southwest of Kingman, the county seat, and 38 miles (61 km) east of Needles, California. Yucca has a hot desert climate (Köppen BWh) with brutally hot summers and cool winters. In summer, it is normal to record temperatures above 110 °F (43 °C) for days on end, while in winter it is very mild with practically no snowfall: the highest rainfall in a month is merely 4.0 inches (0.10 m). The average minimum temperatures in the winter are usually 30 to 45 °F (−1.1 to 7.2 °C). The sun shines throughout the spring and early summer, and most of the limited rain falls from extratropical lows in the cooler months.

Climate data for Yucca, Arizona (1991–2020 normals, extremes 1953–2007, 2009–2017)
Month	Jan	Feb	Mar	Apr	May	Jun	Jul	Aug	Sep	Oct	Nov	Dec	Year
Record high °F (°C)	84 (29)	87 (31)	97 (36)	103 (39)	112 (44)	117 (47)	120 (49)	119 (48)	111 (44)	105 (41)	89 (32)	81 (27)	120 (49)
Mean daily maximum °F (°C)	61.1 (16.2)	64.7 (18.2)	71.5 (21.9)	79.1 (26.2)	88.5 (31.4)	99.2 (37.3)	103.2 (39.6)	102.3 (39.1)	96.4 (35.8)	83.9 (28.8)	70.5 (21.4)	60.0 (15.6)	81.7 (27.6)
Daily mean °F (°C)	49.5 (9.7)	52.4 (11.3)	58.3 (14.6)	64.7 (18.2)	74.1 (23.4)	84.0 (28.9)	90.3 (32.4)	89.3 (31.8)	82.0 (27.8)	69.7 (20.9)	57.4 (14.1)	48.4 (9.1)	68.3 (20.2)
Mean daily minimum °F (°C)	37.9 (3.3)	40.0 (4.4)	45.2 (7.3)	50.4 (10.2)	59.7 (15.4)	68.9 (20.5)	77.4 (25.2)	76.3 (24.6)	67.7 (19.8)	55.5 (13.1)	44.2 (6.8)	36.9 (2.7)	55.0 (12.8)
Record low °F (°C)	11 (−12)	18 (−8)	21 (−6)	31 (−1)	35 (2)	46 (8)	48 (9)	48 (9)	40 (4)	28 (−2)	23 (−5)	15 (−9)	11 (−12)
Average precipitation inches (mm)	1.06 (27)	1.29 (33)	0.83 (21)	0.27 (6.9)	0.10 (2.5)	0.05 (1.3)	0.45 (11)	0.55 (14)	0.49 (12)	0.52 (13)	0.46 (12)	0.59 (15)	6.66 (169)
Average snowfall inches (cm)	0.0 (0.0)	0.0 (0.0)	0.0 (0.0)	0.0 (0.0)	0.0 (0.0)	0.0 (0.0)	0.0 (0.0)	0.0 (0.0)	0.0 (0.0)	0.0 (0.0)	0.0 (0.0)	0.0 (0.0)	0.0 (0.0)
Average precipitation days (≥ 0.01 in)	3.3	4.3	3.3	1.5	0.9	0.2	2.4	3.2	2.2	2.0	1.9	3.1	28.3
Average snowy days (≥ 0.1 in)	0.0	0.0	0.0	0.0	0.0	0.0	0.0	0.0	0.0	0.0	0.0	0.0	0.0
Source: NOAA

== Demographics ==
Historical population
Census	Pop.	Note	%±
2010	126		—
2020	96		−23.8%
U.S. Decennial Census

== Education ==
It is in the Yucca Elementary School District.

== See also ==
- Bullhead City, Arizona
- Chloride, Arizona
- Hualapai people
- Kingman, Arizona
- Lake Havasu City, Arizona
- Mohave people
- Santa Claus, Arizona
