= Navajo water rights =

Water rights on the Navajo Nation

Water rights for the Navajo Nation have been a source of environmental conflict for decades, as Navajo lands have provided energy and water for residents of neighboring states while many of the Navajo do not have electricity or running water in their homes. Beginning in the 1960s, coal mining by Peabody coal at Black Mesa withdrew more than 3 million gallons of water/day from the Navajo aquifer, reducing the number of springs on the reservation. The Navajo Generating Station also consumed about 11 billion gallons of water per year to provide power for the Central Arizona Project that pumps water from Lake Havasu into Arizona.

Native American tribes along the Colorado River were left out of the 1922 Colorado River Compact that divided water among the states, forcing tribes to negotiate settlements with the states for water. The Navajo negotiated water settlements with New Mexico and Utah in 2009 and 2020 respectively, but had not reached an agreement with Arizona in 2023.

On June 22, 2023, the US Supreme Court ruled in Arizona v. Navajo Nation that the federal government of the United States has no obligation to ensure that the Navajo Nation has access to water. The court ruled that the 1868 treaty establishing the Navajo Reservation reserved necessary water to accomplish the purpose of the Navajo Reservation but did not require the United States to take affirmative steps to secure water for the Tribe.

Additionally, environmental crises, such as the 2015 Gold King Mine waste water spill have had lasting impact on the Nation's access to clean water.

== Water rights and access ==
The Navajo reservation is the largest Indian reservation in the US with a population of about 175,000 people. In 2023, about one third of residents did not have running water in their homes.

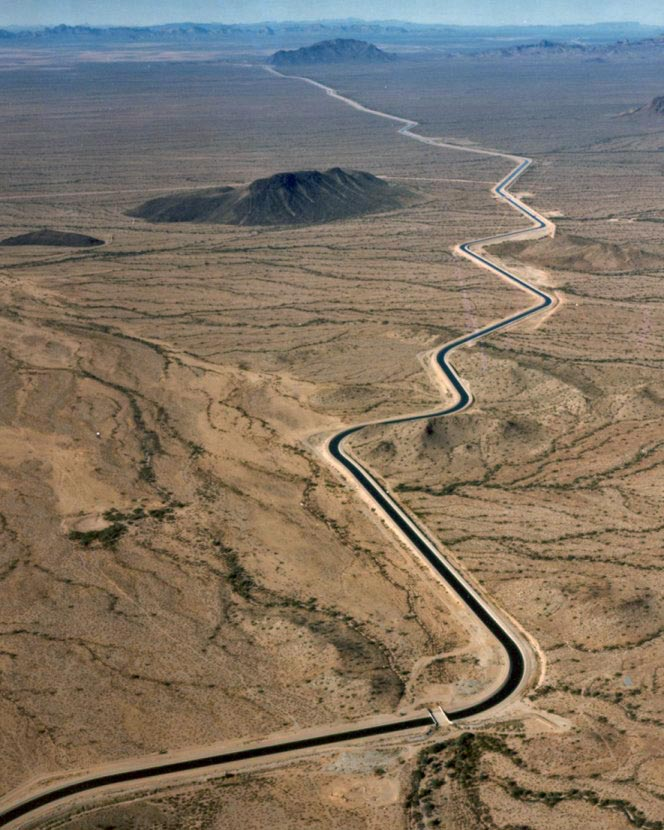
The Central Arizona Project pumps water from the Colorado River into central and Southern Arizona. It was powered by the Navajo Generating Station from 1968 to 2019.

Water rights to the Colorado River are governed by the 1922 Colorado River Compact that divides the water among western states. Indigenous Nations were left out of this agreement, forcing them to negotiate for water from the states. In 1908, the US Supreme Court ruled in Winters vs United States that Native American water rights should have priority over settler claims, because the federal government established those claims when the reservations were formed.

Beginning in the 1960s, coal mining by Peabody coal at Black Mesa withdrew more than 3 million gallons of water/day from the Navajo aquifer, reducing the number of springs on the reservation. From 1968 until 2019, the Navajo Generating Station consumed 11 billion gallons of water/year to provide power for the Central Arizona Project, which pumps water from Lake Havasu into Arizona.

=== New Mexico Water Rights ===
In 2005, the tribe made a water agreement with the state of New Mexico securing some water rights in the San Juan Basin. Congress approved that agreement in 2009, but the tribe lacked pipeline infrastructure to access that water. The San Juan Generating Station’s water reservoir was sold to the U.S. Bureau of Reclamation in 2023 to provide a reliable and sustainable water supply to Navajo homes and businesses. The reservoir was renamed the Frank Chee Willetto Reservoir.

The settlement supports a variety of projects and provides federal funding for some of them. The Navajo Nation will receive water allocations in the form of releases from the Navajo Dam. However, New Mexico maintains priority rights and can deplete from the Navajo Reservoir under certain conditions. The agreement also states that Navajo groundwater diversions from the San Juan Basin in New Mexico can be used for purposes in Arizona, and vice versa.

=== Utah Water Rights ===
In 2020, the tribe completed a water settlement with the state of Utah.

The section of the Navajo Nation Indian Reservation that falls in the southeast corner of Utah is home to over 5,000 people. As of 2022, about half of the Navajo households in Utah have indoor plumbing, and those without may have to travel up to 50 miles round trip to get water.

The water settlement, named “Navajo Nation Utah Water Rights Settlement” outlines the rights of the Navajo Nation to use water from the Colorado River System in Utah, specifically naming allowable withdrawals and depletions from the San Juan River. The new settlement states that the Navajo Nation can withdraw up to 81,500 acre feet annually from the system.

Agreements regarding water rights of the Navajo Nation in Utah also involved allocation of funds to water infrastructure projects. The Infrastructure Investment and Jobs Act, or Bipartisan Infrastructure Law, passed under the Biden Administration in November 2021 awarded $2.5 billion to the Indian Water Rights Completion Fund. Over $200 million of this money was allocated to Navajo Nation water projects under the water rights settlement with the state of Utah.

=== Arizona Water Rights Settlement ===
In 2023, the tribe still had not completed a settlement with the state of Arizona, and is not receiving their share of Arizona's water under the Colorado River Compact. Arizona has tried to use water access as a way to force the Navajo to make concessions on unrelated issues, and other tribes have also had trouble negotiating water settlements with Arizona.

== Arizona v Navajo Nation ==
The tribe brought a lawsuit against the federal government in 2003, seeking to force the federal government to assess the Nation's water needs and "devise a plan to meet those needs." The states of Nevada, Arizona, and Colorado intervened in the suit to protect their access to water from the Colorado River.

In 2021, the 9th U.S. Circuit Court of Appeals ruled that the tribe could force the government to ensure its access to water.

The suit was decided by the Supreme Court in 2023 in favor of the states. Justice Brett Kavanaugh wrote the majority opinion, and said that the 1868 Treaty of Bosque Redondo between the Navajo Nation and the federal government did not require that the US government secure water access for the Navajo.

Justice Neil Gorsuch wrote the dissenting opinion, and argued that the federal government should identify the water rights that are held for the Navajo Nation and ensure that water had not been misappropriated.

The court affirmed the Navajo Nation's right to intervene in lawsuits related to water claims.
