= Yucca Elementary School District =

School district in Arizona, United States

Yucca School District 13

Location
- 12261 South 3rd Street; Yucca, Arizona 86438 United States

Other information
- Website: www.yuccaschool.com

Yucca School District 13 is a public school district based in Mohave County, Arizona.

It includes the census-designated place of Yucca.
