= Black Mountains (Arizona) =

Landform in Mohave County, Arizona

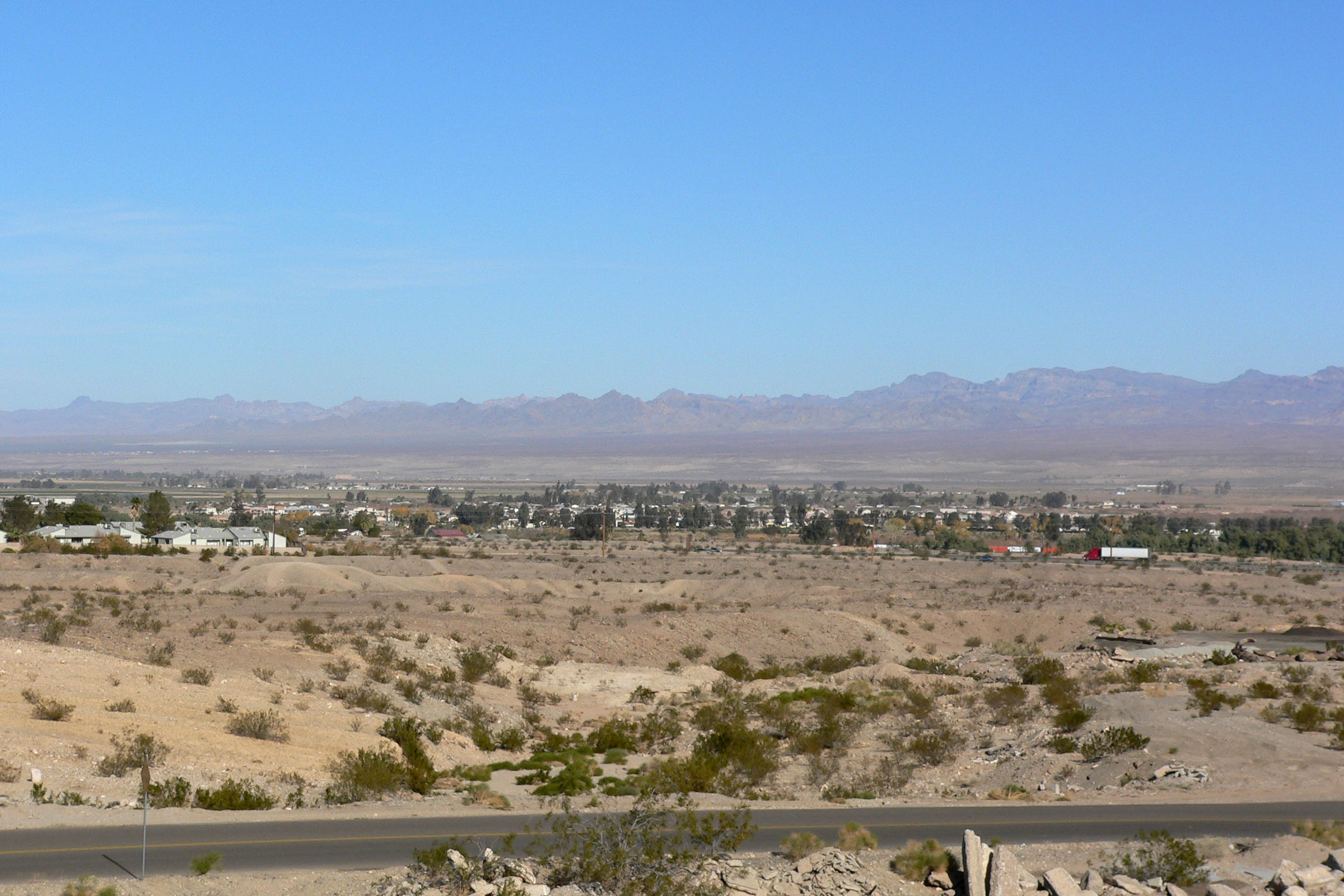
- Black Mountains, N-to-S view from Needles, California east-northeast (overlooking Mohave Valley and Colorado River) (large block at right-(south)-Black Mesa (Black Mountains)

Highest point
- Peak: Mount Perkins
- Elevation: 5,456 ft (1,663 m)
- Coordinates: 35°34′12″N 114°30′31″W

Dimensions
- Length: 75 mi (121 km) N-S
- Width: 13 mi (21 km) (variable)

Geography
- Location within Arizona
- Country: United States
- State: Arizona
- Regions: Mojave Desert; Boundary Cone
- County: Mohave County
- Rivers: Colorado River, Detrital and Sacramento Washes
- Settlement(s): Oatman, Arizona-(south)–Kingman, Arizona; Needles, California
- Borders on: Lake Mead-NW; Colorado River-W; Detrital Valley-NE; White Hills–Hualapai Valley-NE; Cerbat Mountains-E; Sacramento Valley & Hualapai Mtns-SE; Interstate 40 in Arizona-SE & S

The Black Mountains are an extensive, mostly linear, north-south trending 75 miles (121 km) long mountain range in northwest Arizona. It forms the north-south border of southwest Mohave County as it borders the eastern shore of the south-flowing Colorado River from the Hoover Dam.

The northwest and part of the western areas of the range are located within the Lake Mead National Recreation Area. Three wilderness areas are within the range. The historic mining site of Oatman, 4 miles north of Boundary Cone, is nestled in the southern portion of the range between the Mount Nutt and Warm Springs Wildernesses.

== Geography ==
The mountain range is generally 10-15 mi wide, narrower in the north, and west of the Detrital Valley northeast. The southern end of the range with the two wilderness areas is a larger block and the Warm Springs Wilderness is made of a mountain section called Black Mesa, separated from the north section by Sitgreaves Pass, on the route to Oatman, Arizona.

The high point of the range is Mount Perkins at 5,456 feet (1,663 m), located west of the water divide of the Detrital Valley northeast, and the Sacramento Valley (Arizona) southeast. The Cerbat Mountains border eastwards. Mount Perkins, in the center-north of the range, is located at 35°34′12″N 114°30′31″W.

=== Watersheds ===
The Black Mountains are in four watersheds. The north and northeast contain the Lake Mead Watershed, and the north-flowing Detrital Wash Watershed. The west along the Colorado River and southern-west contains the Havasu-Mohave Lakes Watershed where the Sacramento Wash Watershed flows into the southern Topock Marsh, at the southern third of the Havasu-Mohave Lakes region.

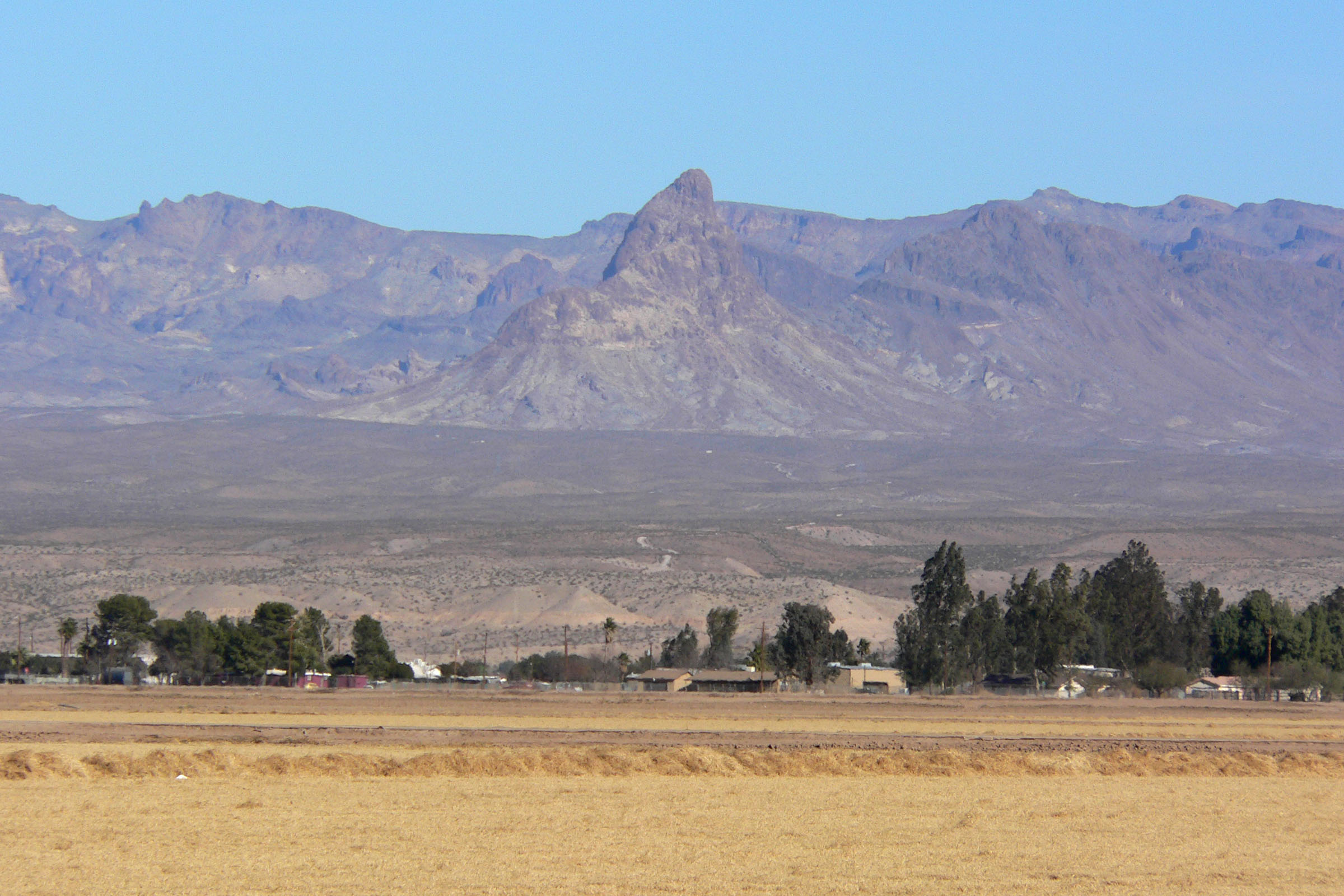
Boundary Cone, a prominent landmark in the western foothills of the Black Mountains, viewed from Mohave Valley

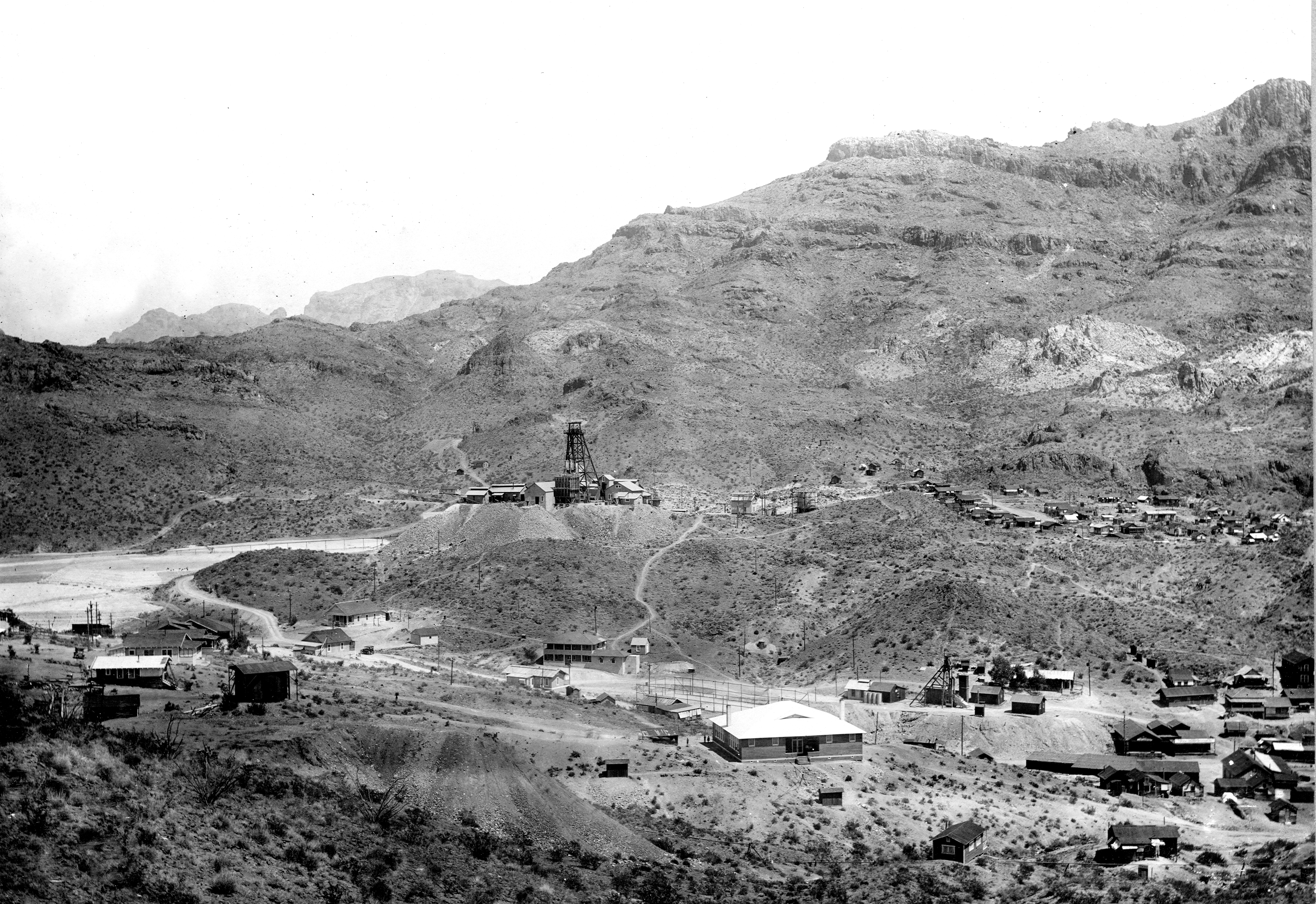
Historic Oatman, AZ, 1921

== See also ==
- Boundary Cone
- Elephants Tooth
- Fortification Hill
