= Black Mesa (Navajo County, Arizona) =

Landform in Navajo County, Arizona

- Location within Arizona

Highest point
- Elevation: 6,120 ft (1,865 m) NAVD 88
- Prominence: 97 ft (30 m)
- Coordinates: 34°23′13″N 110°04′41″W

Geography
- Location: Navajo County, Arizona, U.S.
- Parent range: White Mountains
- Topo map: USGS Taylor

Black Mesa is a mesa in the White Mountains of Navajo County, Arizona. Located on the Navajo Nation, it is just off State Route 77 between Snowflake and Show Low.
