= Black Mesa Peabody Coal controversy =

Environmental dispute

Coordinates: 36°31′29″N 110°23′55″W

Peabody Energy mined coal at the Black Mesa plateau in the southwestern United States from the 1960s until 2019. The plateau overlaps the Navajo and Hopi reservations.

Controversy arose from an unusually generous mineral lease agreement between the Tribes and Peabody Energy and the company's depletion of the Navajo aquifer, which threatened Navajo water rights.

== Controversy ==
In 1964, Peabody Energy (then Peabody Western Coal), a publicly traded energy company based in the Midwestern United States, signed a contract with the Navajo Tribe and two years later with the Hopi Tribe, allowing the company mineral rights and use of an aquifer. The contract was negotiated by prominent natural resources attorney John Sterling Boyden, who claimed to be representing the Hopi Tribe while actually on the payroll of Peabody. It offered unusually advantageous terms for Peabody and was approved despite widespread opposition. The contract is also controversial because of misrepresentations made to the Hopi and Navajo tribes.

Peabody Energy developed two coal strip mines on the Black Mesa reservation: the Black Mesa Mine and the Kayenta Mine. The company pumped water from the underground Navajo Aquifer for washing coal, and, until 2005, in a slurry pipeline operation to transport extracted coal 273 mi (439 km) to the Mohave Generating Station in Laughlin, Nevada. With the pipeline operating, Peabody pumped an average of 3 million gallons of water from the Navajo Aquifer every day. The aquifer is the main source of potable groundwater for the Navajo and Hopi tribes, who use the water for farming and livestock as well as drinking and other domestic uses. The tribes alleged that the pumping of water by Peabody Energy caused a severe decline in the number of springs and reduced their access to potable water. Both tribes, situated in an arid semi-desert, attach religious significance to water, consider it sacred, and have cultural, religious, and practical objections to over-use of water.

The Mohave Generating Station produced energy for Arizona, southern California, and Nevada. This was the only coal slurry operation in the country and the only plant that used groundwater for transport.

Coal from the Kayenta mine was moved via conveyor belt to a silo from where it was loaded and shipped by train to the Navajo Generating Station coal plant.

The Black Mesa Mine's last day of operation was December 31, 2005. The Office of Surface Mining approved Peabody's permit request to continue operations at the mine on December 22, 2008. However, in January 2010, an administrative law judge, on appeal of that approval, decided that the Final Environmental Impact Statement did not satisfy the National Environmental Policy Act because it did not take into account changed conditions, and vacated the approval.

Operations at the Kayenta Mine were ceased in 2019.

== See also ==
- Navajo water rights
- Energy law#United States
- Broken Rainbow
