= Climate Justice Alliance =

US climate advocacy organization

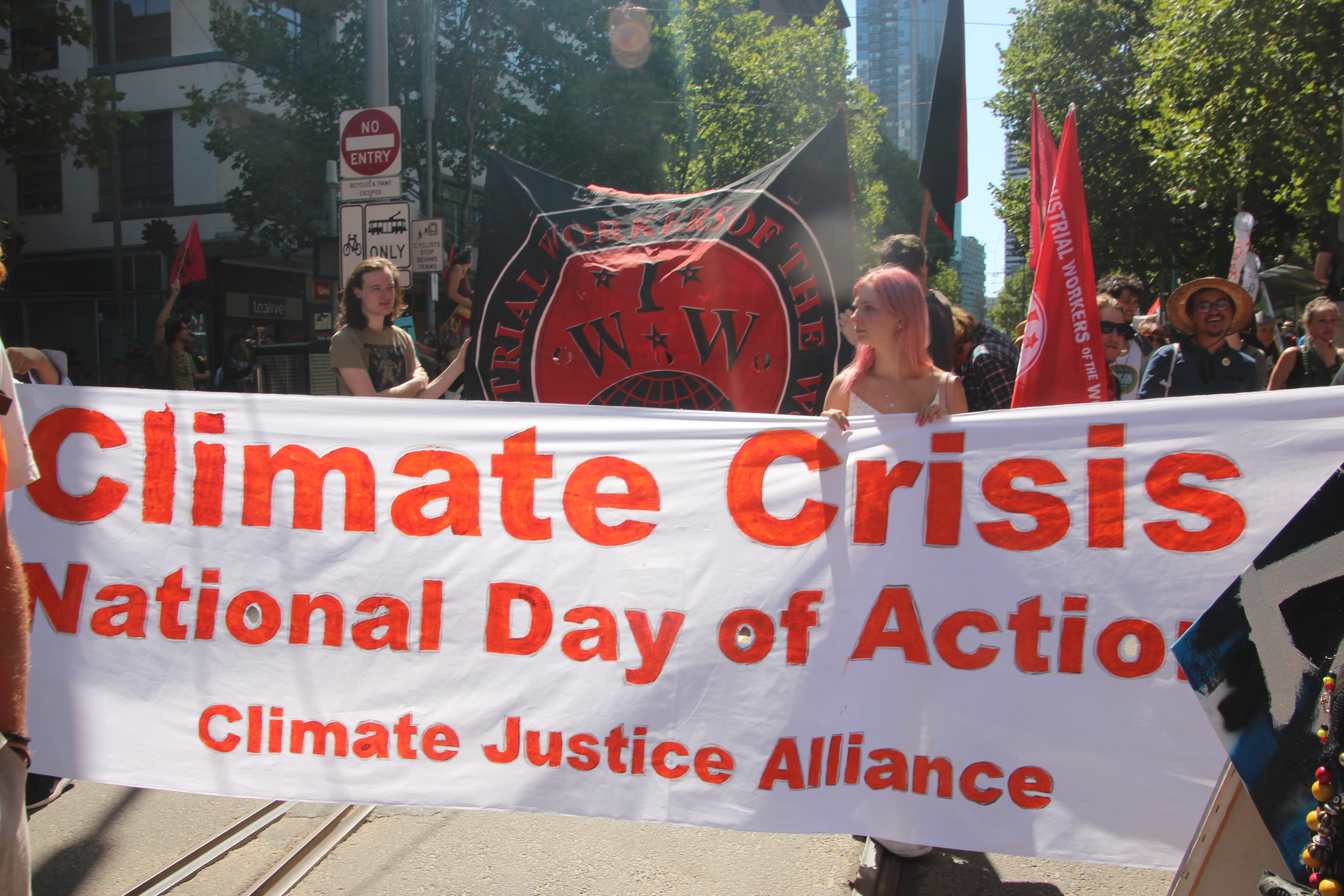
Rally for the climate crisis, Saturday 22 February 2020, Melbourne, organized by the Climate Justice Alliance.

The Climate Justice Alliance (CJA) is a non-governmental collective of over 70 rural and urban community-based organizations focused on sustainability, development of underrepresented communities, race and ethnicity, economic development, and poverty alleviation — all with the wider aim of addressing climate change. Founded in 2013, CJA is rooted in the environmental justice movement in that it centers efforts around protesting and organizing against the disproportionate harm of climate change on marginalized communities.

The stated goal of CJA to create "[apply] the power of deep grassroots organizing to win local, regional, statewide, and national shifts" in regards to climate change and unjust exposure of marginalized communities to its damaging effects.

== History ==
=== Roots ===
While CJA was officially formed in 2013, the organization traces its origin to a 3-year period of coordinated grassroots protest activities. Most notably, early members of CJA organized a 400-person assembly for climate justice at the 2010 US Social Forum in Detroit.

=== Formation of CJA ===
Following its formal establishment, CJA launched its first coordinated effort with an organized effort hosted by the Black Mesa Water Coalition in the Black Mesa region of Arizona. The activities sought to coordinate community-led action strategies to alleviate urban development of the region and gathered 100 of its members to protest activities of large coal mining companies and their effects on vulnerable populations in the area.

== Our Power Campaign ==
As part of their Black Mesa activities, CJA established an ongoing effort called the “Our Power Campaign” which involves the construction of what they call a “local living economy”. CJA calls these groups “Our Power Communities” (OPC) and they are based on a model of:

- Zero Waste
- Regional Food Systems
- Public Transportation
- Clean Community Energy
- Efficient, Affordable, and Durable Housing
- Ecosystem Restoration and Stewardship

CJA has also established a loan fund as part of the campaign that helps their OPCs become loan-ready via technical support and coaching.

== 6-Point Strategy ==
CJA describes its main strategies for climate justice success as:

- "Fight the bad" - Organizing against and protesting against organizations their members perceive as harmful to the environment and marginalized communities
- "Build the new" - Building economic models and institutions, such as with their "Our Power Communities"
- "Change the rules" - Policy efforts and political partnerships, such as with the Green New Deal
- "Move the money" - Organizing to move money out of the old economy using both public and private vehicles.
- "Build the bigger we" - Aiming to establish geographical growth of the alliance across countries
- "Change the story" - speaking out against perceived unjust systems that are currently the "norm"

== Involvement in Green New Deal ==
Diagram describing the flow of natural resources through the economy: Valuable resources are procured from nature by the input end of the economy; the resources flow through the economy, being transformed and manufactured into goods along the way; and invaluable waste and pollution eventually accumulate by the output end. Recycling of material resources is possible, but only by using up some energy resources as well as an additional amount of other material resources; and energy resources, in turn, cannot be recycled at all, but are dissipated as waste heat.

The Climate Justice Alliance supports the Green New Deal, a climate proposal first introduced by Rep. Alexandria Ocasio-Cortez of New York and Sen. Edward J. Markey of Massachusetts.

However, upon the proposal of the Green New Deal, delegates from CJA spoke out publicly about the need for a focus on protecting “frontline communities” (those who are most exposed to the damaging effects of climate change) via public statements and organizing members in Washington D.C. to address United States Congress directly.

“The Climate Justice Alliance welcomes the bold Green New Deal initiative from Rep. Alexandria Ocasio-Cortez and other Members of Congress; however, to truly address the interlinked crises of a faltering democracy, growing wealth disparity and community devastation caused by climate change and industrial pollution, we must reduce emissions at their source. Allowing for neoliberal constructs such as Net Zero emissions, which equate carbon emission offsets and technology investments with real emissions reductions at source, would only exacerbate existing pollution burdens on frontline communities. Such loopholes for carbon markets and unproven techno-fixes only serve to line the coffers of the polluting corporations, while increasing (not reducing) harm to our communities. Our communities can no longer be used as sacrifice zones.” - Angela Adrar, Executive Director, Climate Justice Alliance

Since sharing their perspective on necessary additions to the deal, CJA has spearheaded local versions of the Green New Deal and iterations including the “Feminist Green New Deal” and the “Green New Deal for Public Housing” alongside Senator/2020 presidential candidate, Bernie Sanders, and Rep. Ocasio-Cortez.
