= Mount Nutt Wilderness =

Protected area in Mohave County, Arizona

- IUCN category Ib (wilderness area)
- Location within the United States
- Location: Mohave County, Arizona, United States
- Nearest city: Bullhead City, AZ
- Coordinates: 35°6′15″N 114°21′10″W
- Area: 28,080 acres (114 km^{2})
- Established: 1990
- Governing body: U.S. Department of Interior Bureau of Land Management

Mount Nutt Wilderness is a protected wilderness area in the central part of the Black Mountains in the U.S. state of Arizona. It was established in 1990 under the Arizona Desert Wilderness Act, and it is managed by the Bureau of Land Management. This desert wilderness sits among a maze of desert canyons and steep mesas, surrounded by volcanic plugs.

Mount Nutt, the namesake for the wilderness, rises to an elevation of 5,216 feet (1589 m). Vegetation in the area includes cottonwoods, willows, and oak, sustained by several springs, that also support a small population of desert bighorn sheep.

Mount Nutt Wilderness contains the Cave Spring Trail and the Twin Springs Trail.

== See also ==
- List of Arizona Wilderness Areas
- List of U.S. Wilderness Areas
