= Oatman, Arizona =

Census-designated place in Mohave County, Arizona, United States

- Census-designated place
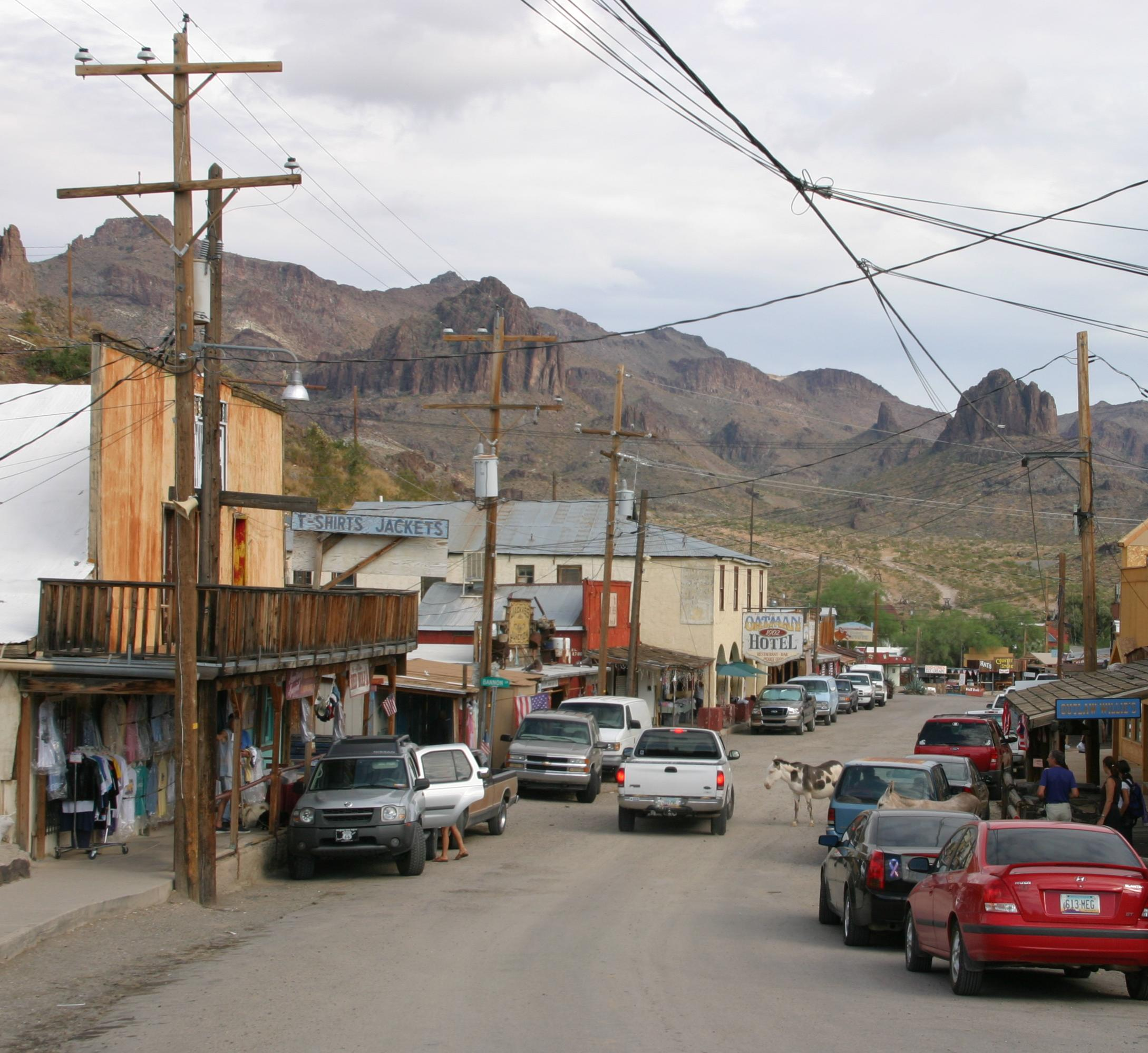
- Main street of Oatman, August 2005

- Location within Arizona Location within the United States
- Coordinates: 35°01′39″N 114°23′02″W
- Country: United States
- State: Arizona
- County: Mohave
- Named for: Olive Oatman

Area
  - Total: 0.19 sq mi (0.50 km^{2})
  - Land: 0.19 sq mi (0.50 km^{2})
  - Water: 0 sq mi (0.00 km^{2})
- Elevation: 2,723 ft (830 m)

Population (2020)
  - Total: 102
  - Density: 531.2/sq mi (205.08/km^{2})
- Time zone: UTC-7 (MST (no DST))
- ZIP Code: 86433
- FIPS code: 04-50620
- GNIS feature ID: 2582835

Oatman is a census-designated place (CDP) in the Black Mountains of Mohave County, Arizona, United States, at an elevation of 2,710 feet (830 m). In 1915, it began as a small mining camp when two prospectors struck US$10 million (equivalent to $181 million in 2025) in gold, though the vicinity had already been settled for several years. Oatman's population grew to more than 3,500 in one year. As of the 2020 United States census, its population was 102.

== History ==
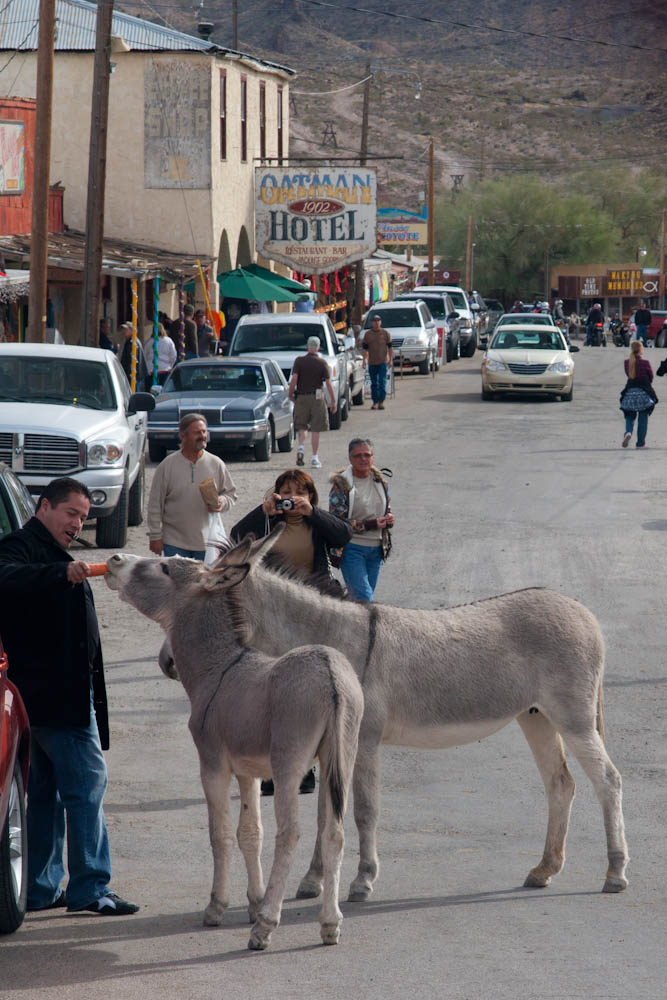
Burros regularly roam the streets of Oatman.

The name Oatman was chosen in honor of Olive Oatman, a young Illinois girl who was captured and enslaved by Indians, probably from the Tolkepayas tribe, during her pioneer family's massacre while on their journey westward in 1851. She was later sold or traded to the Mohave people, who adopted her and tattooed her face in the custom of the tribe. She was released in 1856 at Fort Yuma.

In 1863, prospector John Thomas Moss discovered gold in the Black Mountains and staked several claims, one named the Moss after himself and another after Olive Oatman, whose story was well known. For the next half-century, mining waxed and waned in the remote district until new technology, reduced transportation costs, and new gold discoveries brought prosperity to Oatman in the early 20th century. The opening of the Tom Reed mine, followed by the discovery of a rich ore body in the nearby United Eastern Mining Company's property in 1915, brought one of the desert's last gold rushes. The boom of 1915–1917 gave Oatman all the characters and characteristics of any gold rush boomtown. For about one decade, the mines of Oatman were among the largest gold producers in the American West.

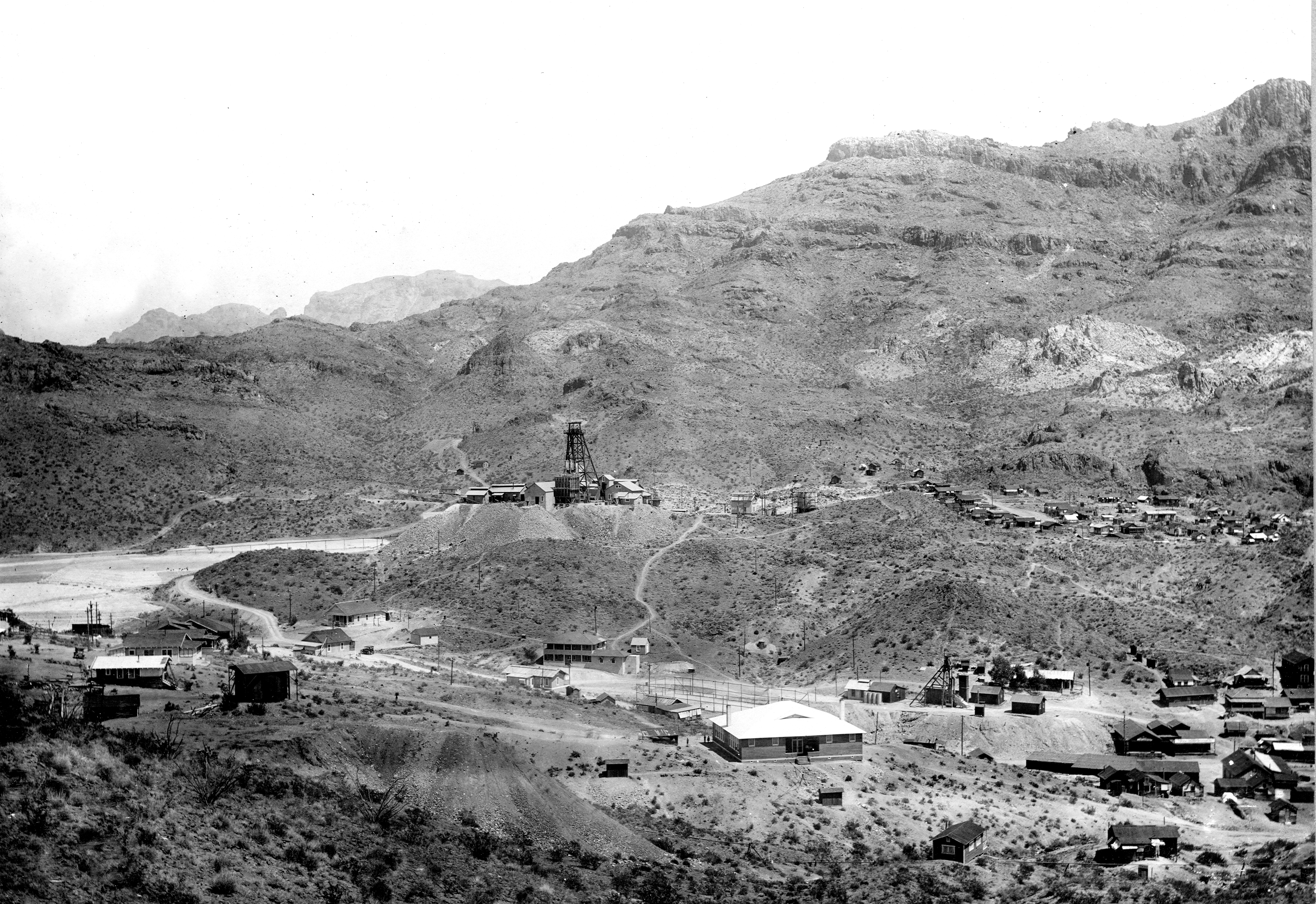
Oatman in 1921

In 1921, a fire burned down many of Oatman's smaller buildings, but spared the Oatman Hotel built in 1902. It remains the oldest two-story adobe structure in Mohave County and is a Mohave County historical landmark. One of the hotel's major attractions is a room designated as the suite where Clark Gable and Carole Lombard supposedly spent their honeymoon after their 1939 wedding in Kingman, Arizona. In actuality, Gable and Lombard returned directly to Los Angeles after their wedding for a press conference the next morning and did not take a honeymoon until much later in Baja California.

In 1924, the town's main employer, United Eastern Mines, permanently shut down its operations after producing $13.6 million (equivalent to $255 million in 2025) worth of gold at the government-controlled market value of $20 per ounce. The district had produced $40 million (equivalent to $751 million in 2025) in gold by 1941, when the remainder of the town's gold mining operations were ordered shut down by the government as part of the country's war effort, because other metals were needed. Oatman was fortunate it was located on busy U.S. Route 66 and catered to travelers driving between Kingman, Arizona, and Needles, California. Yet even that advantage was short-lived, because the town was completely bypassed in 1953 when a new route was built between Kingman and Needles. By the 1960s, Oatman was all but abandoned.

The town survives as a nostalgic Route 66 stop with a Wild West feel down to the wooden sidewalks, staged shootouts, and wild burros wandering the streets. The federal government rounds up areawide wild burros using helicopters and said, "Oatman is a very particular case because that town's basically all about burros."

== Demographics ==
Historical population
| Census | Pop. | Note | %± |
|---|---|---|---|
| 2010 | 135 | | — |
| 2020 | 102 | | −24.4% |
U.S. Decennial Census

== See also ==
- List of historic structures in Oatman, Arizona
- List of census-designated places in Arizona
- Oatman Flat
- Oatman Flat Station
- Elephants Tooth
