= Black Mesa (Apache-Navajo Counties, Arizona) =

Landform in Arizona

Coordinates: 34.2808509°N 113.8385493°W

Black Mesa (also called Big Mountain) is an upland mountainous mesa of Arizona, north-trending in Navajo County, west and southeast-trending in Apache County. In Navajo it is called Dziłíjiin ('Black Mountain') and during Mexican rule of Arizona it was called Mesa de las Vacas (Spanish for 'mesa of the cows'). It derives its dark appearance from its pinyon-juniper and mixed conifer woodlands.

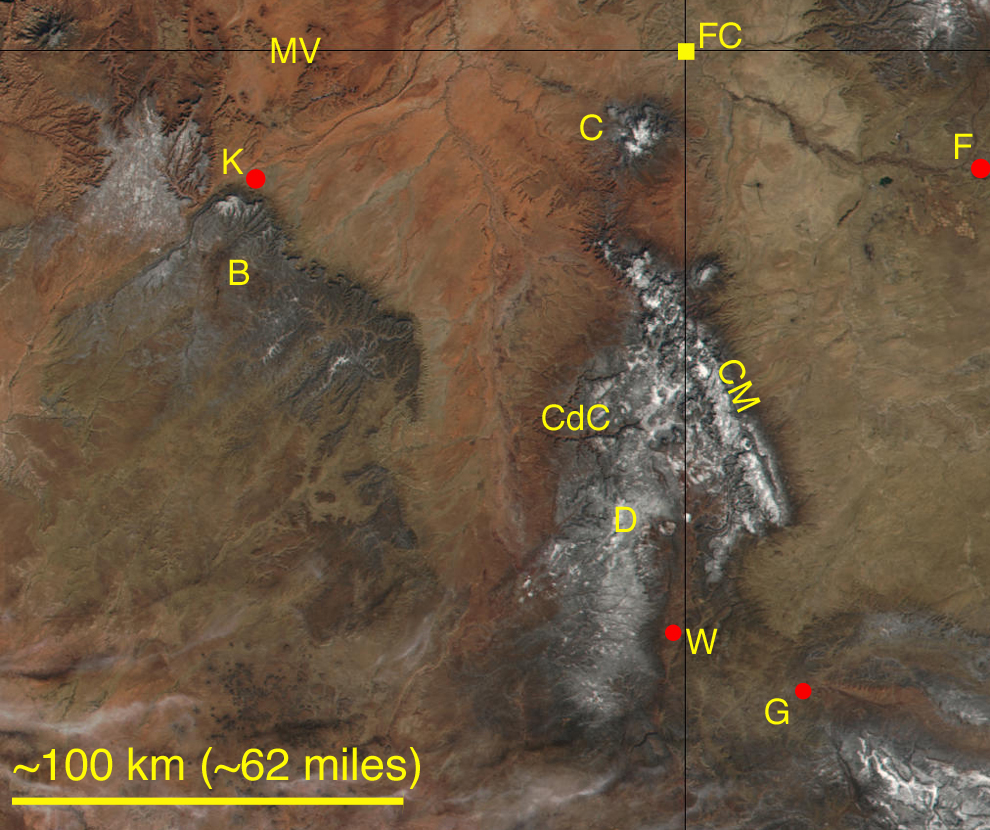
Satellite image of northeastern Arizona and northwestern New Mexico, including the Four Corners Monument (FC). Some higher elevations have a dust of snow. Labeled natural features are the Chuska Mountains (CM), the Carrizo Mountains (C), Monument Valley Navajo Tribal Park (MV), Black Mesa (B), Canyon de Chelly National Monument (CdC), and the Defiance Uplift-(Plateau) (D). Labeled towns are Farmington, New Mexico (F), Gallup, New Mexico (G), Window Rock, Arizona (W), and Kayenta, Arizona (K).

== Geography ==
The mesa is located on the Colorado Plateau near Kayenta, Arizona, and rises to over 8,168 ft (2,490 m). Its highest peak is located on Black Mesa's northern rim, a few miles south of the town of Kayenta. Reliable springs surfacing at several locations mean the mesa is more suitable for continuous habitation than much of the surrounding desert area. It is now split between the Hopi and Diné (Navajo) tribal reservations.

Black Mesa is also the name of a small Navajo community off BIA-8066, which lies 17 mi (27 km) west of Rough Rock, 20 mi (32 km) north of Blue Gap and 25 mi (40 km) northeast of Pinon. In the area is a local Chapter House and a community school.

The mesa is located within, and gives its name to, the Black Mesa Basin.

=== Mining ===
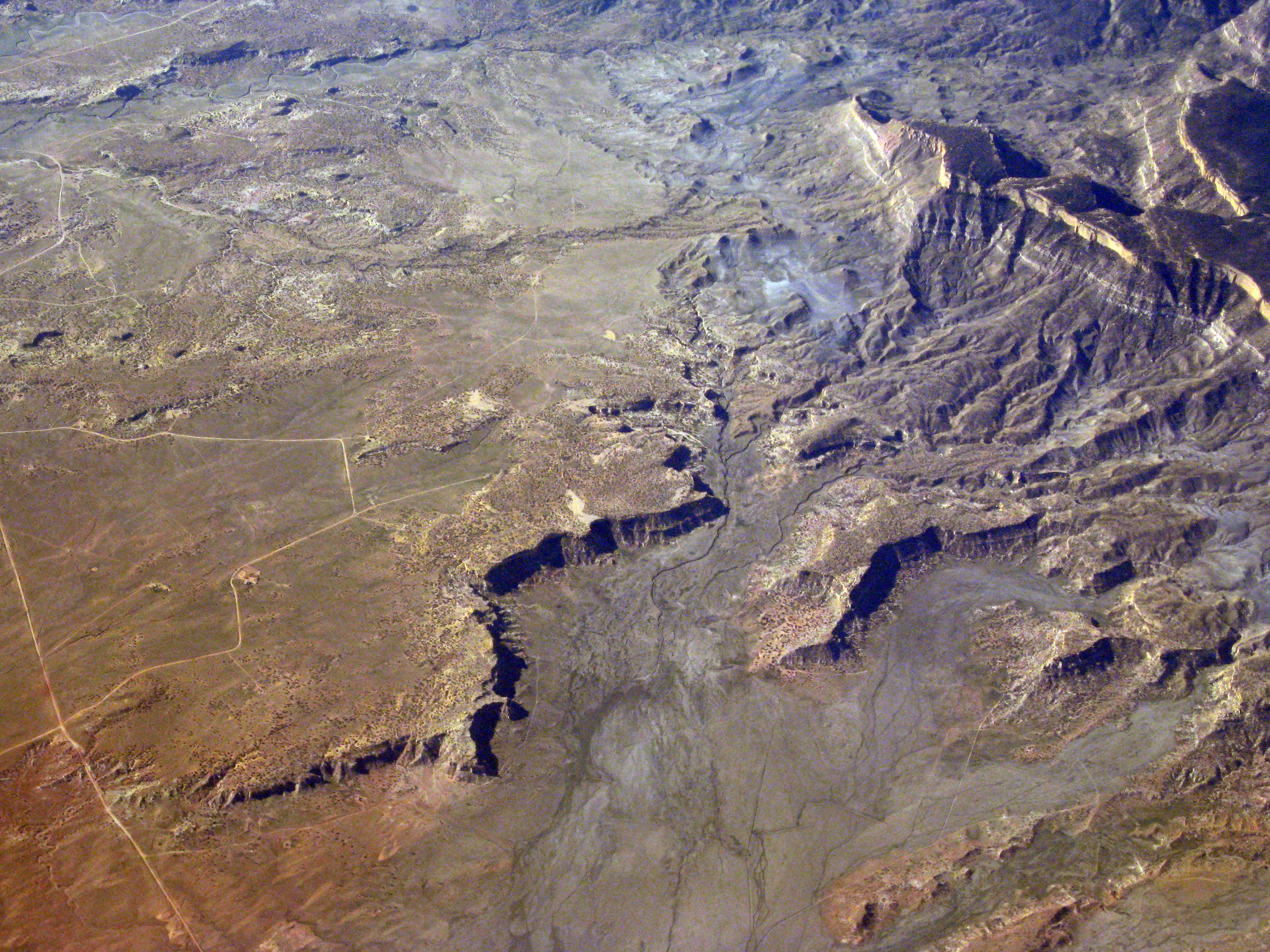
Black Mesa, west of Chilchinbito, Arizona.

Since the 1960s the mesa has been strip mined for coal by the Peabody Western Coal Company, stirring a controversy over Peabody Energy's use of groundwater to transport coal.

In 2013, the Climate Justice Alliance (CJA), collaborating with the Black Mesa Water Coalition, held their first national gathering in opposition to the strip mining of the mesa. The gathering had an attendance of 100 members.

== See also ==
- Black Mesa Peabody Coal debate
- Black Mesa and Lake Powell Railroad
