= Sacramento Valley (Arizona) =

Landform in Mohave County, Arizona

- Location within Arizona
- Length: 50 mi (80 km) North–south
- Width: 10 mi (16 km)
- Area: 500 mi^{2} (1,300 km^{2})

Geography
- Location: Mohave County, Arizona, United States
- Coordinates: 35°05′20″N 114°10′10″W
- River: Sacramento Wash
- Interactive map of Sacramento Valley

The Sacramento Valley of northwestern Arizona is a north–south trending valley west and southwest of Kingman in Mohave County. The valley lies just east of the southern section of the Black Mountains. Interstate 40 in Arizona traverses the valley north–south.

The Sacramento Wash is the first southerly drainage south of the Havasu-Mohave Lakes Watershed entering the east bank of the south-flowing Colorado River. The Sacramento Wash Watershed flows south-then-westerly into the Colorado; Kingman lies in the northeast of the Sacramento Wash Watershed on the water divide with the Hualapai Wash Watershed lying to the east, that flows north into the Colorado River as it enters Lake Mead.
