= Moccasin Mountains =

Landform at the Arizona–Utah border

- Location within Arizona

Highest point
- Peak: Lone Butte (Moccasin Mountains)
- Elevation: 6,191 ft (1,887 m)

Dimensions
- Length: 11 mi (18 km)
- Width: 8 mi (13 km)

Geography
- Country: United States
- States: Arizona and Utah
- Counties: Mohave County, AZ and Kane County, UT
- Communities: Kaibab, AZ and Moccasin, AZ
- Range coordinates: 36°54′34″N 112°45′32″W
- Borders on: Zion National Park, Block Mesas, White Cliffs, Moquith Mountains, Vermilion Cliffs, Yellowstone Mesa, Antelope Valley and Clayhole Valley

The Moccasin Mountains is an 11-mile-long (18 km) mountain range located at the Arizona–Utah border in Mohave County, Arizona, and a small north section in Kane County, Utah.

The range comprises, at lower elevations, the Vermilion Cliffs, as part of its northeast, east, south, and southwest borders. Moccasin Canyon in the center-south, and Twomile Wash at the southeast lie in sections of the Vermilion Cliffs, and most of the entire mountains are part of the Kaibab Indian Reservation.

Moccasin, Arizona lies at the downhill stretch of Moccasin Canyon; Kaibab lies 2 miles (3.2 km) southeast, with both townsites surrounded by the Vermilion Cliffs.

Pipe Spring National Monument is 2 miles (3.2 km) south of Kaibab. In Utah, the northeast of the mountains are bordered by Coral Pink Sand Dunes State Park.

== Description ==
The mountains are mostly a circular section and about 11 miles (18 km) long north-to-south. The southeast is defined by a canyon section, with the southeast-flowing Twomile Wash; origins of the wash, and its canyon reaches almost the mountain range centerpoint. The townsites of Moccasin and Kaibab are in this southeast section. Point Spring is located just northeast of the towns.

Two other springs are located in the range. At the southwest is Meeks Spring, at the origin of Potter Canyon, which trends southwest, then almost due-south. The central northeast of the range contains Willow Spring. Another spring is just east, Red Cliff Spring, at the base of the Vermilion Cliffs, and at the south terminus of the Moquith Mountains, (below Ed Lamb Point).

=== Peaks ===
There are no major peaks in the center of the mountain range. In Arizona, 1 mile (1.6 km) southwest of the Vermilion Cliffs foothills, is Lone Butte, at 6,191 feet (1,887 m). Cane Beds, Arizona, (elevation 5,099 feet (1,554 m)), at the southwest mountain foothills, lies 2 miles (3.2 km) north, so there is a prominence of about 1,090 feet (330 m).

In Utah, there is also a highpoint at the north foothills, adjacent south, to Sand Dunes Road, Dixie Knoll, at 5,859 feet (1,786 m).

== Access ==
Arizona State Route 389 traverses the southwest, south, and southeast foothills of the Moccasin Mountains, along the Vermilion Cliffs. Kaibab, and Moccasin, Arizona are on a 4-mile-long (6.4 km) route that trends north into the southern section of the mountains. Arizona 389 is accessed from Fredonia from the east, (adjacent to Kanab, Utah north, on U.S. Route 89), and from the west, Hildale-Colorado City; Cane Beds, AZ lies east of the two communities, at the Vermilion Cliffs, and the southwest region of the Moccasin Mountains.

The northwest, north, and northeast of the range in Utah can be accessed by Sand Dunes Road, and the region of Coral Pink Sand Dunes State Park. Sand Dune Road exits southerly from U.S. 89, just southeast of Mount Carmel Junction and Mount Carmel, and the Moccasin Mountains are about 15 miles (24 km) distant.
