= Kanab Plateau =

Plateau in Arizona, United States

- Plateau
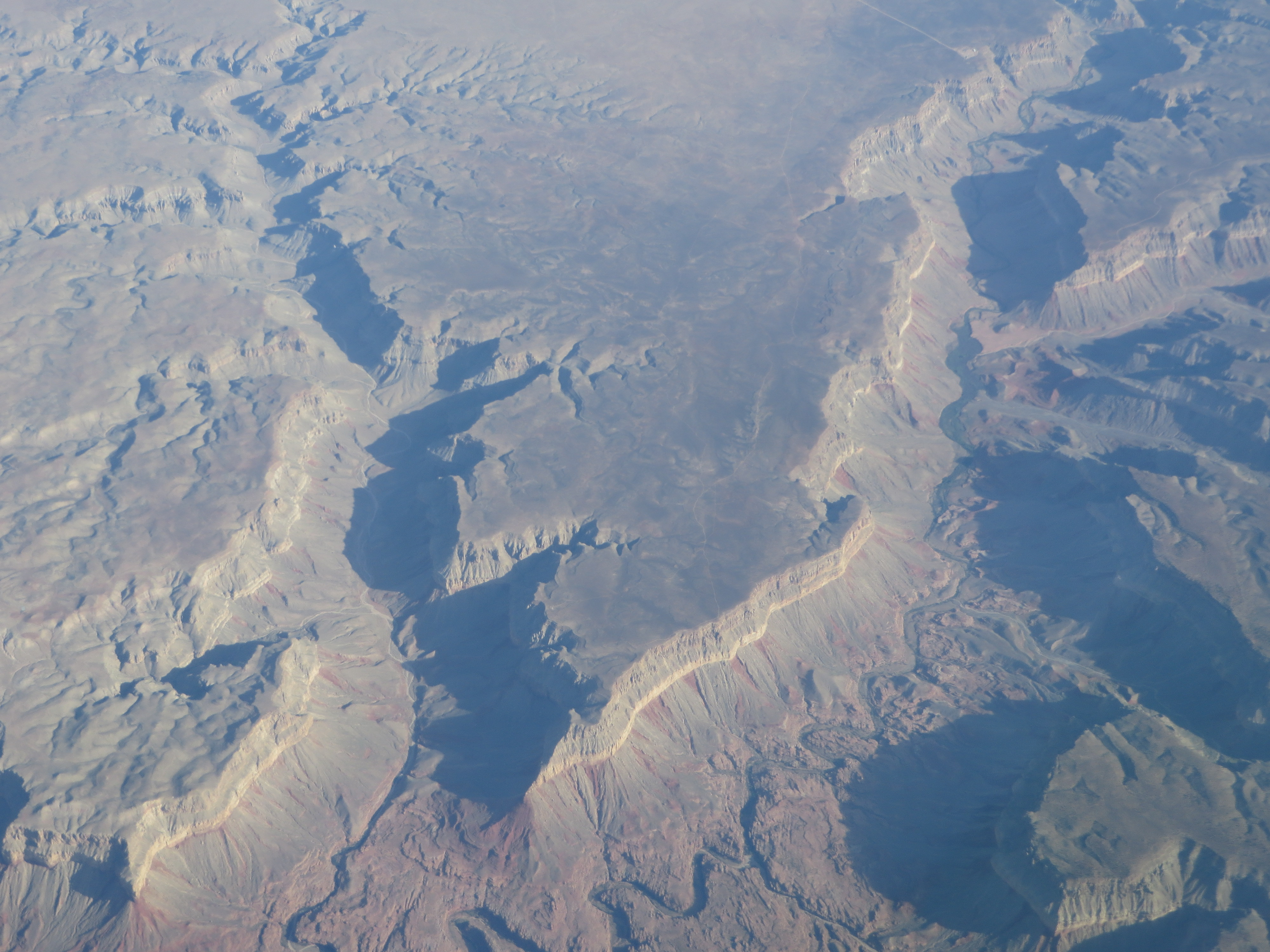
- Kanab Plateau (aerial photo)

- Kanab Plateau in Arizona
- Coordinates: 36°42′35″N 112°31′45″W
- Location: Fredonia, Coconino, High Plateas section of Arizona, Colorado Plateau, Arizona, United States
- Geology: Moenkopi Formation-(west of Kanab Creek), Kaibab Limestone- (east, older unit)

Dimensions
  - Length: 45 mi (72 km)

The Kanab Plateau is a 45-mile (72 km) long plateau located at the north of the Grand Canyon in Arizona, United States. The plateau is adjacent west of the Kaibab Plateau of the North Rim, with a basin containing the Kanab Creek watershed in between. The basin is the site of the Kanab Creek Wilderness, with Snake Gulch at its north perimeter, and at the base of the Kanab Plateau, forming its southeast border.

Kanab Creek is a due-south flowing creek, and crosses just southeast of the center of the Kanab Plateau. The creek is also the border of Mohave County to the west, and Coconino County to the east; Coconino County is also south on the border of the Colorado River.

== Description ==
The Kanab Plateau is about 45-mi long, somewhat arc-shaped, as it surrounds Snake Gulch, a northeast tributary to Kanab Creek. The plateau is aligned southwest to northeast, with the same alignment of the small Antelope Valley, to the west and southwest.

The highpoint of the plateau is in the northeast, Cedar Knoll, 5,706 feet (1,739 m)). Cedar Knoll is 11-mi from Fredonia on paved Road 22.

== Access ==
The main access to the north of the Kanab Plateau is from Fredonia adjacent to the north-northeast plateau perimeter. U.S. Route 89A from Jacob Lake at the north of the Kaibab Plateau to the east, crosses the northeast Kaibab Plateau. It climbs up Cooper Ridge to the LeFevre Overlook, and from the overlook, the distance across the northeast plateau section to Fredonia, is about 8-mi.

To the southwest from Fredonia, Arizona State Route 389 parallels the plateau's northwest, (about 10-mi). The unimproved route of Antelope Valley Road exits southwest from Arizona 389 to Antelope Valley's east side at the perimeter of Kanab Plateau's west and southwest. Near the southwest end of the plateau, Road 1023 (22-mi from Arizona 389), exits southeasterly to meet the trailhead of Hack Canyon, about 5-mi from Kanab Creek.

Another paved route, Road 22, crosses Kanab Plateau southeasterly towards Jacob Lake. It crosses diagonally across the plateau, northeast of the center; Jacob Canyon is southwest, and Wildcat Canyon is northeast. The paved route is 23-mi long, terminating with an 8-mi section of unimproved canyon routes west of Jacob Lake. Cedar Knoll-(plateau highpoint), is at the 11-mi point on the route.

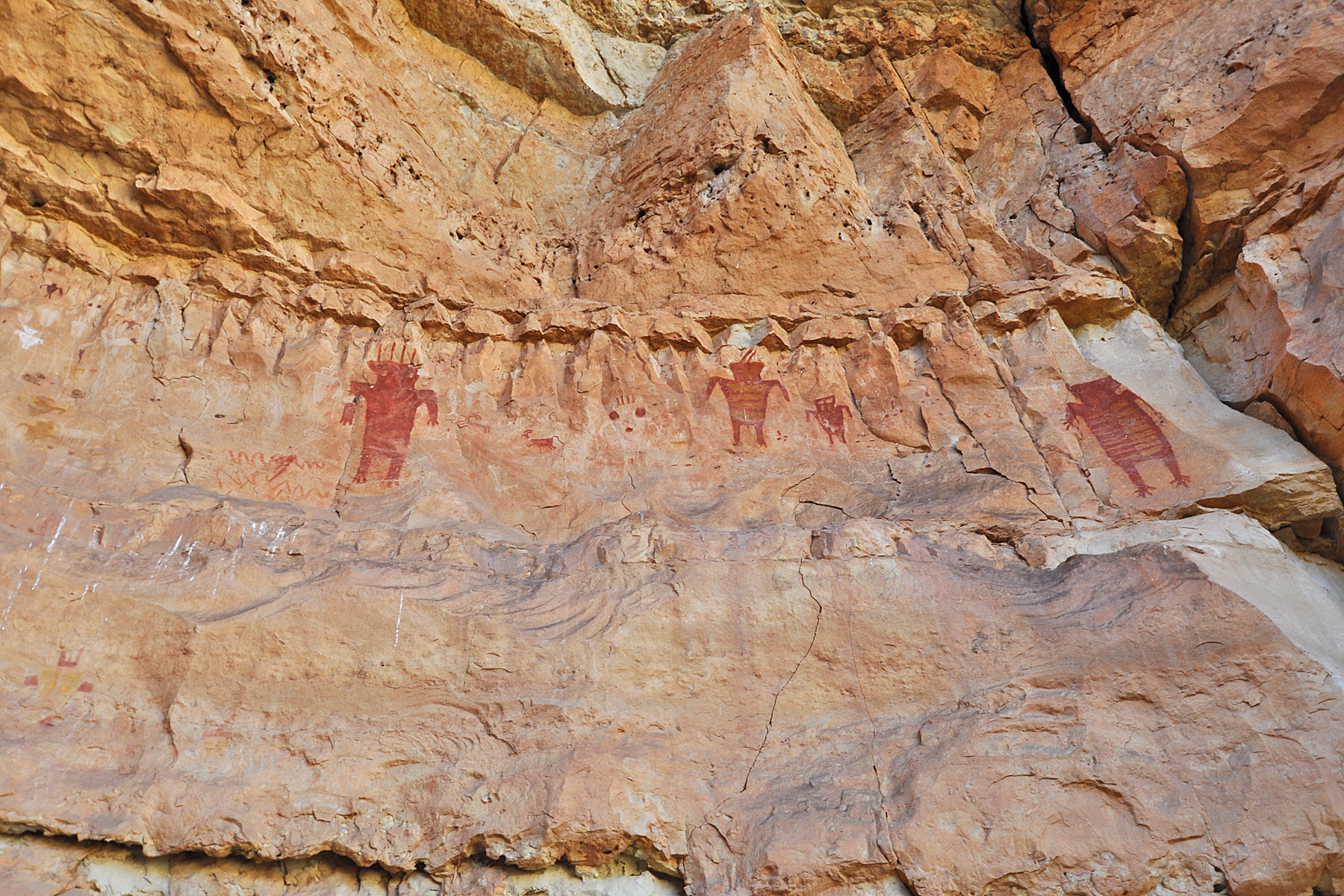
Detail from the Snake Gulch pictograph site

== See also ==
- Kanab Creek
