= Kanab Creek Wilderness =

Protected area in the Kaibab National Forest

- IUCN category Ib (wilderness area)
- Location within the United States
- Location: Coconino / Mohave counties, Arizona, United States
- Nearest city: Fredonia, AZ
- Coordinates: 36°33′55″N 112°34′08″W
- Area: 75,300 acres (305 km^{2})
- Established: 1984
- Governing body: U.S. Forest Service & Bureau of Land Management

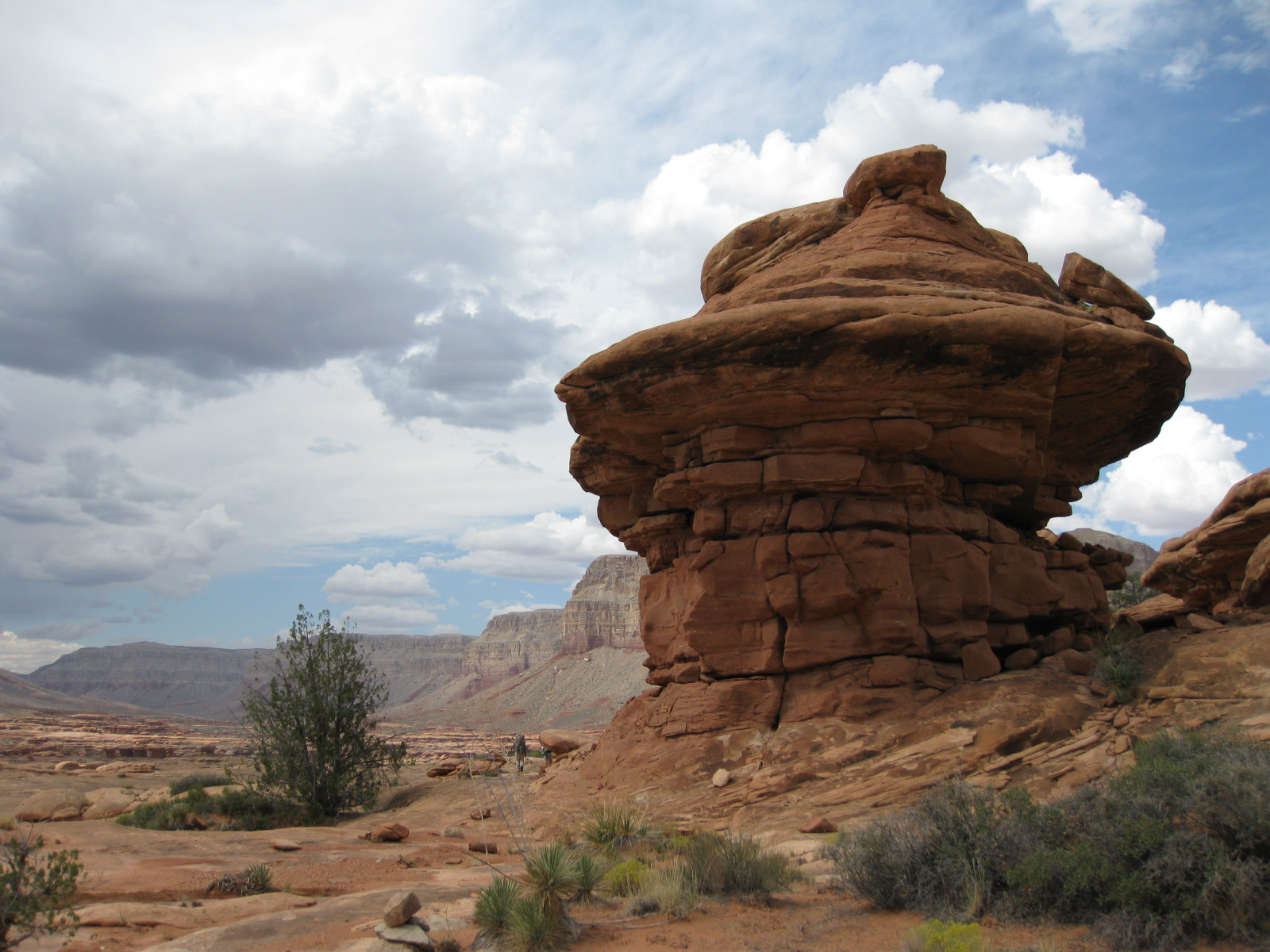
Kanab Creek Wilderness

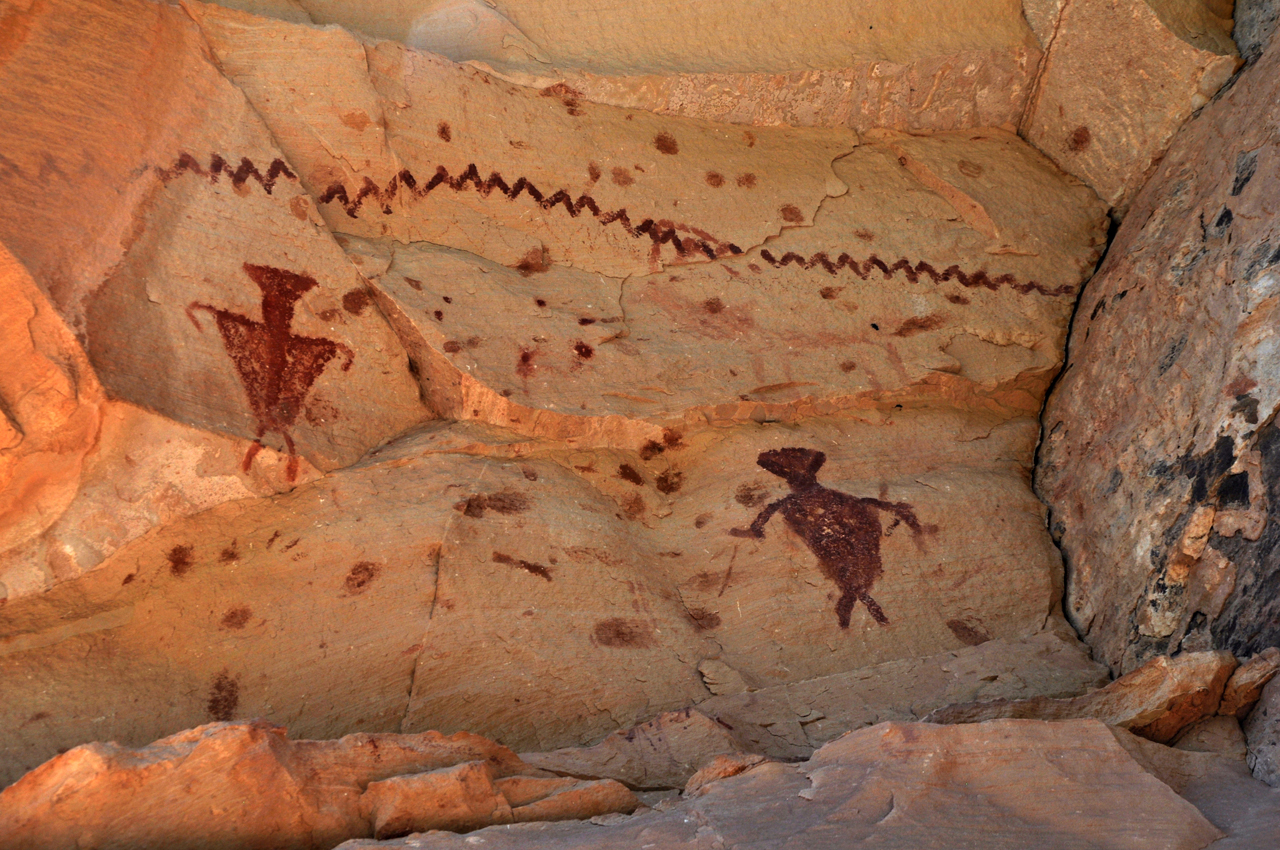
Pictographs in Kanab Creek Wilderness

Kanab Creek Wilderness is a 75,300-acre (305 km^{2}) wilderness area located along the Coconino/Mohave County line in the U.S. state of Arizona, approximately 30 miles (48 km) south of Fredonia. 68,600 acres (278 km^{2}) of the Wilderness are located in the North Kaibab Ranger District of the Kaibab National Forest, the remaining 6,700 acres (27 km^{2}) are administered by the Bureau of Land Management.

One of the major tributaries of the Colorado River, Kanab Creek is the largest tributary canyon system on the north side of the Grand Canyon. From its origin approximately 50 miles (80 km) north in southern Utah, Kanab Creek and its feeder streams have cut a network of gorges with vertical walls deep into the Kanab and Kaibab Plateaus. Elevations in the Wilderness range from 2,000 feet (610 m) at the river to about 6,000 feet (1,829 m) on the rim.

Evidence in Kanab Creek Wilderness indicates that this area was inhabited by prehistoric peoples up to approximately AD 1100. The Wilderness contains some of the most interesting and significant rock art in the Southwest.

Part of the monument is in Baaj Nwaavjo I'tah Kukveni – Ancestral Footprints of the Grand Canyon National Monument, designated in 2023.

== Vegetation ==
Kanab Creek Wilderness is dominated by desert shrub blackbush, with occasional clumps of Indian ricegrass or needle-and-thread grass in the lower elevations. Along the drainage bottoms are groups of cottonwood, desert almond, western redbud, and single-leaf ash trees, though some of these riparian habitats are being invaded by salt cedar. The upper reaches have some stands of pinyon pine and juniper, but sagebrush dominates most of the area.

== Wildlife ==
The higher elevations of Kanab Creek Wilderness are used as winter range by mule deer and almost all of the chukar partridge in Arizona live in this area. The area is home to bobcat, fox, coyote, and various small mammals such as rabbit, squirrel, and mice. Several species of toad, frog, lizard, and snake can also be found in this area. The only known venomous snake in the Wilderness is the rattlesnake.

== Trails ==
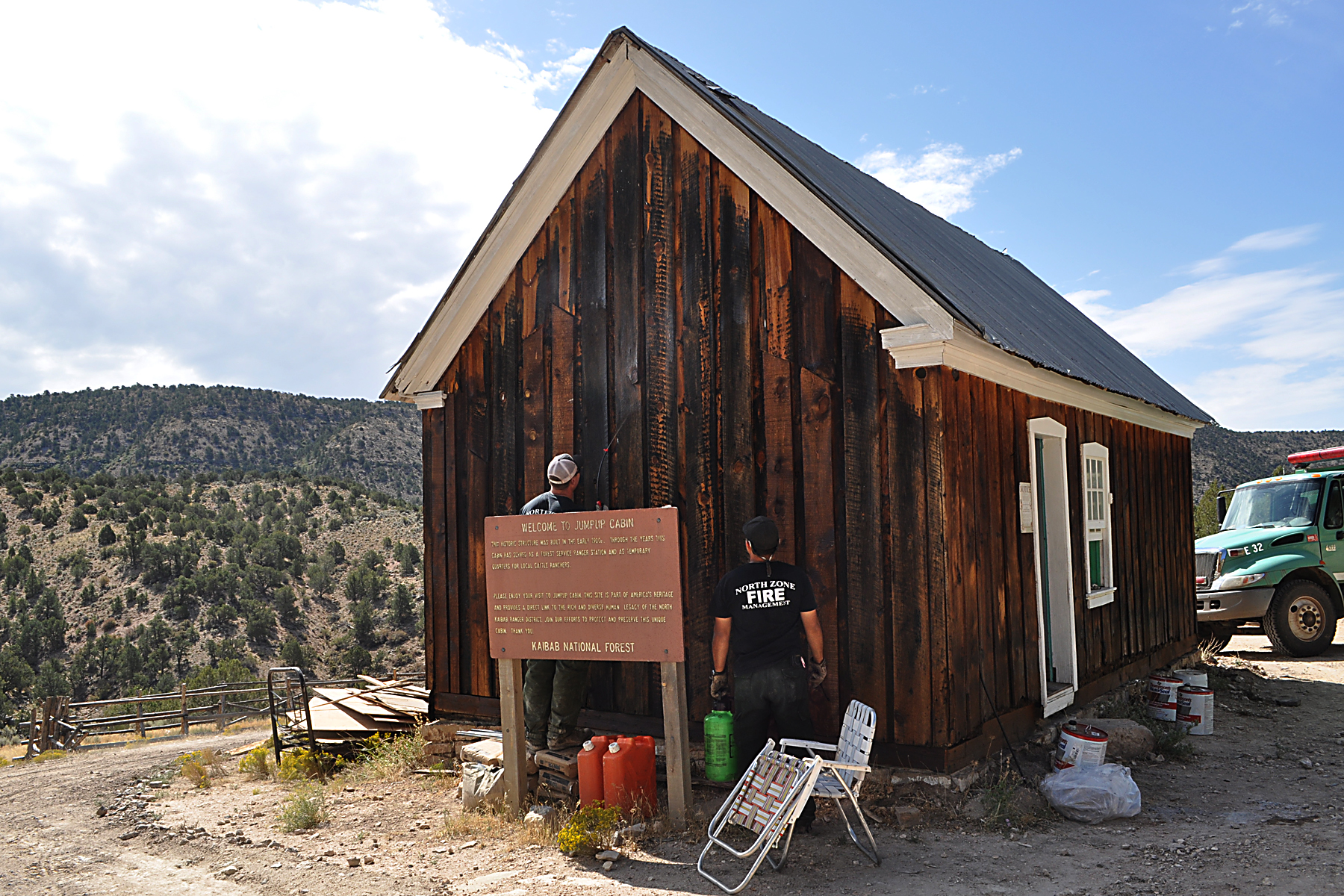
Historic Jump Up Cabin, built in 1906, overlooks the Kanab Creek Wilderness. It was restored in 2009 by the Forest Service.

Three trails lead into Kanab Creek Wilderness:

- Jumpup-Nail Trail or Trail #8 descends from Sowats Point, crosses Sowats Canyon, and descends into Jumpup Canyon where it joins Trail #41. This trail is 6 miles (9.7 km) long.
- Ranger Trail or Trail #41 descends into Jumpup Canyon for about four miles before exiting the canyon just above Lower Jumpup Spring. It then follows the general contour of a sandstone bench that encircles the Jumpup Point promontory before crossing Lawson, Dinner Pockets, and Big Cove Canyons and descends into Kanab Creek Canyon about 5 miles beyond Lawson. It ends in the canyon where it joins Trail #59. This trail is 17 miles (27.4 km) long.
- Snake Gulch-Kanab Creek Trail or Trail #59 joins the Ranger Trail in Kanab Creek Canyon about three miles downstream from the confluence with Snake Gulch. It then continues down the canyon but is not signed or maintained beyond that point. This trail is 21.5 miles (34.6 km) long.

== See also ==
- List of U.S. Wilderness Areas
- List of Arizona Wilderness Areas
- Wilderness Act
- Kanab Creek Trail
