= El Capitan High School =

El Capitan High School may refer to two schools in the United States:

- El Capitan High School (Arizona)
- El Capitan High School (California)
