= Kanab Creek =

River in Utah and Arizona in the United States

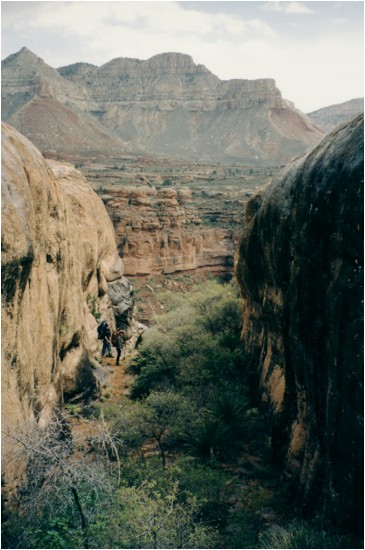
Kanab Creek in Kanab Canyon

Kanab Creek (/kəˈnæb/ kə-NAB) is one of the many tributaries of the Colorado River. It begins in Kane County, Utah, just south of the watershed to the Great Basin and flows 125 miles (201 km) south to the Colorado River.

The stream headwaters arise at 37°29′31″N 112°22′50″W at an elevation of approximately 8600 feet along the base of the Sunset Cliffs. The stream flows southwest and passes just to the east of the community of Alton where it turns to the south and passes under Utah State Route 136. It continues to the south and runs parallel to U.S. Route 89 past Kanab. The stream enters Arizona where it becomes the border between Coconino and Mohave counties and flows past Fredonia. It flows through the Kaibab Indian Reservation of the Paiute people and the Kanab Creek Wilderness before reaching its confluence with the Colorado at 36°23′32″N 112°37′48″W at an elevation of 1913 feet within the Grand Canyon National Park.

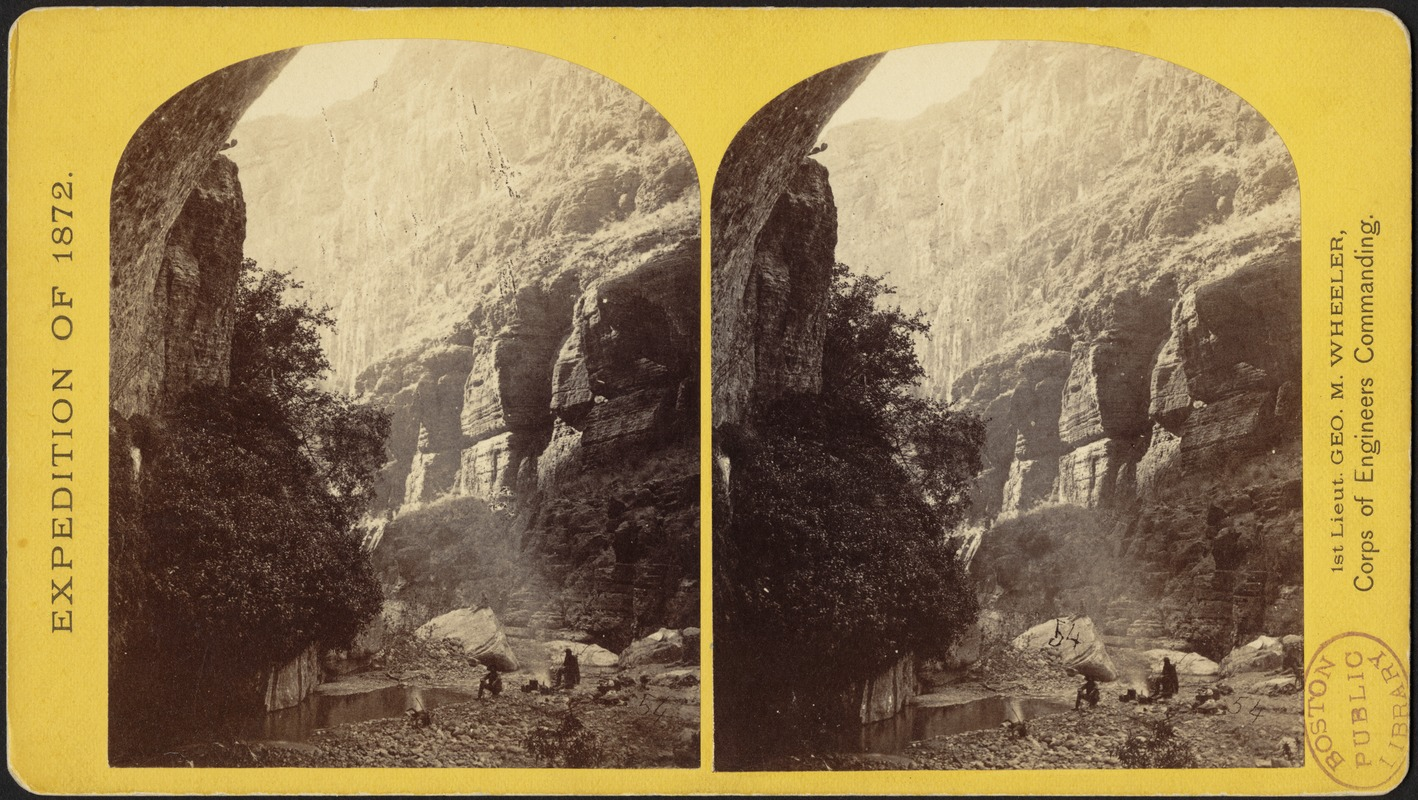
Cañon of Kanab Creek, 1872. Photographs of the American West, Boston Public Library

The valley of Kanab Creek was settled by Basketmaker and Anasazi Indians. Ruins of their buildings and artifacts are found along its course.

A crossing of the creek at 36°51′50″N 112°34′47″W is known as Nagles Crossing.

== See also ==
- Kanab Creek Trail
- List of tributaries of the Colorado River
