= Kaibab, Arizona =

CDP in Mohave County, Arizona

- Census-designated place
- Location in Mohave County and the state of Arizona

- Location within Arizona Location within the United States
- Coordinates: 36°53′06″N 112°43′40″W
- Country: United States
- State: Arizona
- County: Mohave

Area
  - Total: 6.46 sq mi (16.74 km^{2})
  - Land: 6.46 sq mi (16.72 km^{2})
  - Water: 0.0077 sq mi (0.02 km^{2})
- Elevation: 4,948 ft (1,508 m)

Population (2020)
  - Total: 140
  - Density: 21.7/sq mi (8.37/km^{2})
- Time zone: UTC-7 (MST)
- ZIP code: 86022
- Area code: 928
- FIPS code: 04-36500
- GNIS feature ID: 2408459

Kaibab is an unincorporated community and census-designated place (CDP) in Mohave County, Arizona, United States. It is within the Kaibab Indian Reservation. The population of the CDP was 140 at the 2020 census.

== Geography ==
Kaibab is located in the northeast corner of Mohave County. Arizona State Route 389 forms the southern edge of the CDP; the highway leads northeast 13 miles (21 km) to Fredonia and northwest 18 miles (29 km) to Colorado City. The townsite of Kaibab is 3 miles (5 km) north of AZ 389 on Pipe Spring Road.

Pipe Spring National Monument is in the southwest corner of the CDP, close to AZ 389. The CDP is bordered to the north by the CDP of Moccasin. According to the United States Census Bureau, the Kaibab CDP has a total area of 6.4 square miles (16.7 km^{2}), of which 0.01 square miles (0.02 km^{2}), or 0.1%, is water.

The townsite is located at a section of the Vermilion Cliffs and a southeast stretch of the Moccasin Mountains.

== Demographics ==
Historical population
Census	Pop.	Note	%±
2000	275		—
2010	124		−54.9%
2020	140		12.9%
U.S. Decennial Census

As of the census of 2000, there were 275 people, 88 households, and 69 families living in the CDP. The population density was 1.5 inhabitants per square mile (0.58/km^{2}). There were 116 housing units at an average density of 0.6 per square mile (0.23/km^{2}). The racial makeup of the CDP was 40% White, 53% Native American, 4% from other races, and 4% from two or more races. 8% of the population were Hispanic or Latino of any race. (Note: percentages do not total 100% because of rounding.)

There were 88 households, out of which 53% had children under the age of 18 living with them, 44% were married couples living together, 28% had a female householder with no husband present, and 21% were non-families. 19% of all households were made up of individuals, and 2% had someone living alone who was 65 years of age or older. The average household size was 3.1 and the average family size was 3.5.

In the CDP, the age distribution of the population shows 44% under the age of 18, 9% from 18 to 24, 23% from 25 to 44, 20% from 45 to 64, and 4% who were 65 years of age or older. The median age was 22 years. For every 100 females, there were 75.2 males. For every 100 females age 18 and over, there were 81.2 males.

The median income for a household in the CDP was $21,458, and the median income for a family was $22,679. Males had a median income of $25,313 versus $16,607 for females. The per capita income for the CDP was $9,421. About 27% of families and 30% of the population were below the poverty line, including 35% of those under the age of eighteen and none of those 65 or over.

== Education ==
The CDP is in the Fredonia-Moccasin Unified School District.
