= Fredonia-Moccasin Unified School District =

School district in Arizona, United States

Address
- 221 East Hortt Street Fredonia, Arizona, 86022; United States

District information
- Type: Public
- Grades: PreK–12
- NCES District ID: 0403080

Students and staff
- Students: 187
- Teachers: 14.68 (FTE)
- Staff: 17.99 (FTE)
- Student–teacher ratio: 12.74

Other information
- Website: fredonia.org

Fredonia-Moccasin Unified School District is a school district headquartered in Fredonia, Arizona, United States.

== History ==
It was founded via the merger of Fredonia Elementary School District (officially known as School District No. 6, Coconino County), Fredonia High School District (officially known as Union High School District No. 6, Coconino County), Moccasin School District (officially known as School District No. 10, Mohave County), and Cane Beds School District in May 1974 as the state's first, and to date only ever, school district to cross county lines.

Coconino County was chosen as the district's county of jurisdiction since most area and people are in Coconino County.

== Schools ==
The schools operated by the district include Fredonia Elementary/Middle School and Fredonia High School; both are in Fredonia.

== Attendance boundary ==
Within Coconino County it serves, in addition to Fredonia: Greenehaven and sections of Page. A small section of Grand Canyon Village coincides with the district. The district also serves sections of Mohave County. There it serves sections of the Kaibab Reservation, including Kaibab and Moccasin. It also serves most of Cane Beds.

The district serves Fredonia and unincorporated Coconino County communities close to the Grand Canyon National Park, such as the Kaibab Indian Reservation.
