= Arizona One mine =

Uranium mine

- Interactive map of Arizona One mine

Location
- Location: Arizona, United States; 36°30′28″N 112°48′22″W

Production
- Products: Uranium

History
- Opened: 2009
- Closed: 2014 (scheduled)

Owner
- Company: Energy Fuels Resources Inc.

The Arizona One mine is a uranium mine located in Arizona about 35 miles (56 km) south of Fredonia.

Arizona One represents one of the largest uranium reserves in the United States having estimated reserves of 10.3 million tonnes of ore grading 0.68% uranium.

Arizona One is scheduled to close in early 2014 due to ore depletion and low prices.
