= Moccasin, Arizona =

CDP in Mohave County, Arizona

- Census-designated place
- Location in Mohave County, Arizona

- Location within Arizona Location within the United States
- Coordinates: 36°54′34″N 112°45′32″W
- Country: United States
- State: Arizona
- County: Mohave

Area
  - Total: 0.76 sq mi (1.98 km^{2})
  - Land: 0.76 sq mi (1.98 km^{2})
  - Water: 0 sq mi (0.00 km^{2})
- Elevation: 5,063 ft (1,543 m)

Population (2020)
  - Total: 53
  - Density: 69.2/sq mi (26.72/km^{2})
- Time zone: UTC-7 (Mountain (MST))
- ZIP Code: 86022 (Fredonia)
- Area code: 928
- GNIS feature ID: 2582828
- FIPS code: 04-47190

Moccasin is an unincorporated community and census-designated place in Mohave County, Arizona, United States. It is within the Kaibab Indian Reservation, and its population was 53 as of the 2020 census, down from 89 at the 2010 census. It is bordered to the south by the CDP of Kaibab.

Some say the community was named from a single moccasin found near the original town site, while others believe a moccasin-shaped rock formation caused the name to be selected. Sometime in the late 1800s.

Historical population
Census	Pop.	Note	%±
2010	89		—
2020	53		−40.4%
U.S. Decennial Census

== Education ==
The CDP is in the Fredonia-Moccasin Unified School District.
