= Cane Beds, Arizona =

- Census-designated place
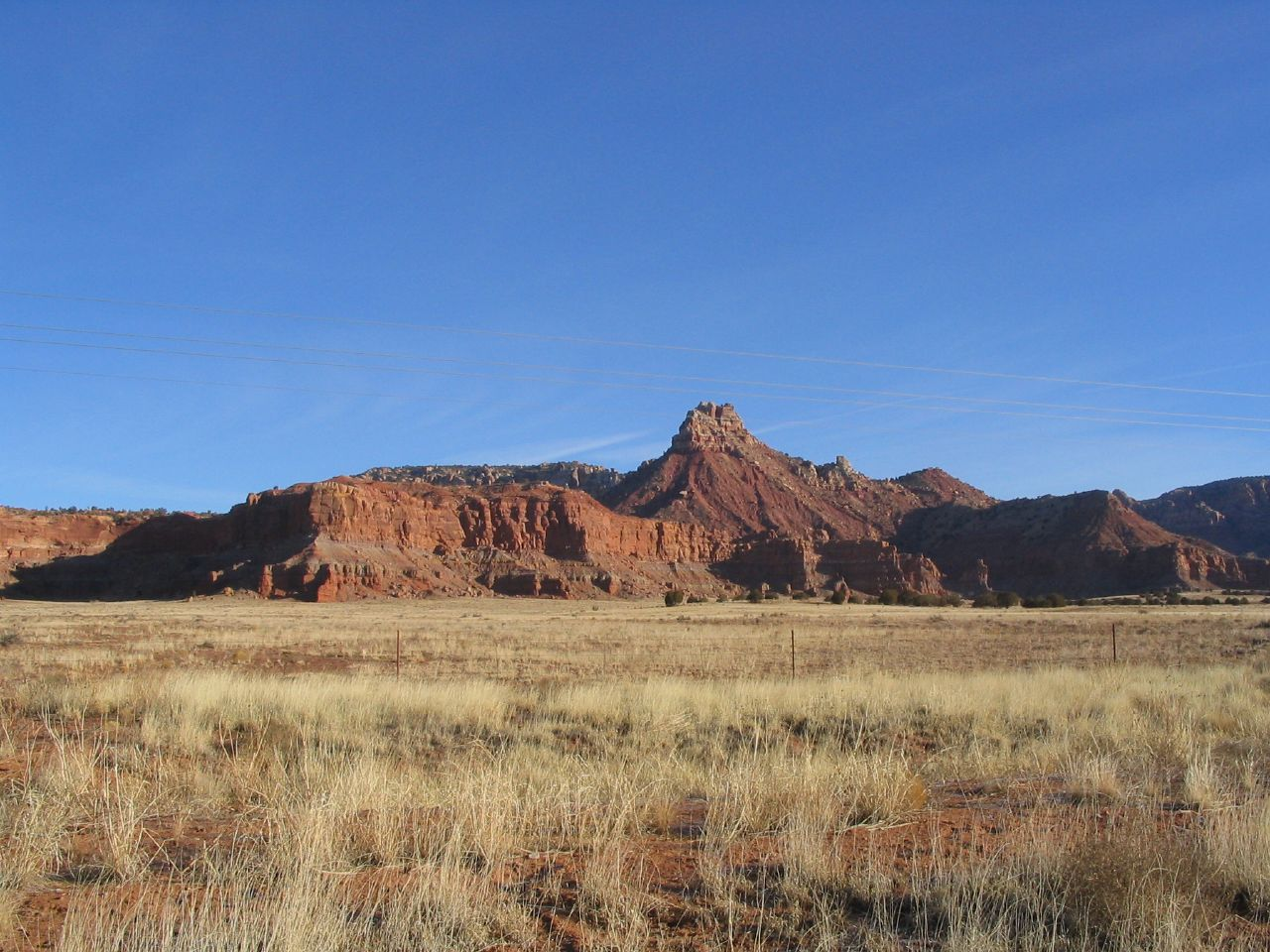
- Cane Beds Road in 2004

- Location within Arizona Location within the United States
- Coordinates: 36°56′33″N 112°53′32″W
- Country: United States
- State: Arizona
- County: Mohave
- Established: 1868

Area
  - Total: 8.29 sq mi (21.46 km^{2})
  - Land: 8.29 sq mi (21.46 km^{2})
  - Water: 0 sq mi (0.00 km^{2})
- Elevation: 5,046 ft (1,538 m)

Population (2020)
  - Total: 466
  - Density: 56.3/sq mi (21.72/km^{2})
- Time zone: UTC-7 (MST)
- ZIP Code: 86022
- FIPS code: 04-09900
- GNIS feature ID: 2582747

Cane Beds is an unincorporated community and census-designated place (CDP) in Mohave County, Arizona, United States. It lies 4 miles (6 km) south of the border with Utah in the Arizona Strip, and is supported by services in Utah as well as some in Nevada.

The population was 466 at the 2020 census. The community is historically Mormon, and presently also includes several families from breakaway Mormon groups. It has a small tourism industry because of nearby scenic hiking trails.

== Etymology ==
The name of the town refers to cane that grows natively in the area. In Will C. Barnes' book of Arizona place names, Barnes quoted a letter received from a resident, Annie W. Wilkinson, in his explanation of the name of Cane Beds: "When settlers first came here they found beds of wild cane growing in the district. Some can still be found, hence the name." The name has historically been recorded as "Cain Patch". Cane Patch Creek/Cane Beds Spring has the same etymology.

The Southern Paiute name, Paɣáŋq`ʷton^{Ɛ}nįnto`, translates to "cane valley". Edward Sapir identified a Paiute location romanized as "Paganktonic" as likely being Cane Beds.

== History ==
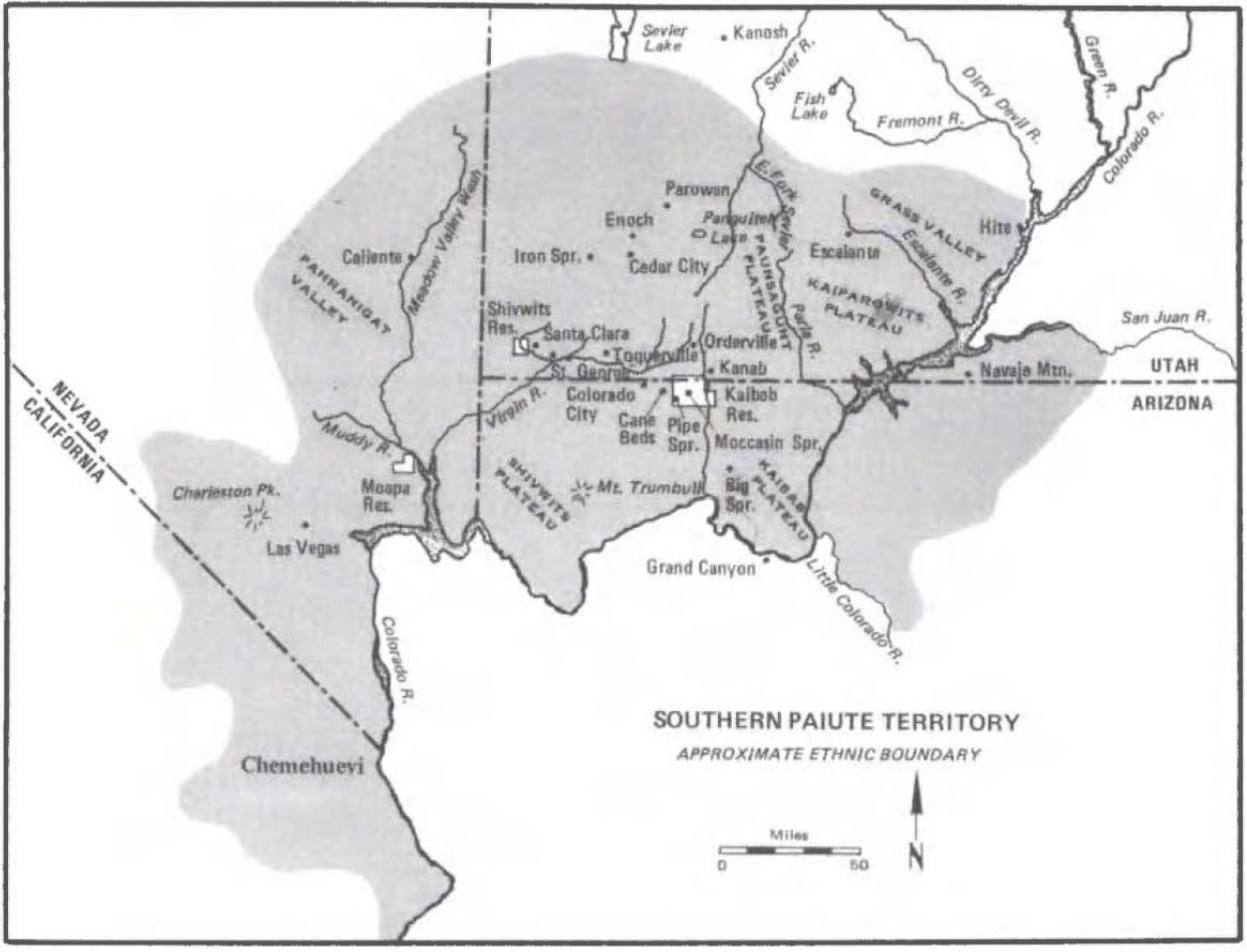
1934 map of the Southern Paiute with Cane Beds marked

Until the 20th century, the land was occupied by Southern Paiute people; it is seen within the Paiute territory on maps from 1934, which had receded north and was completely absent in Arizona by 1986. There are Paiute, Archaic, and Anasazi sites in the area.

As the Arizona Strip was largely ignored by the government, the Cane Beds land was first explored by settlers during early pioneering expeditions of Mormons in northern Arizona, by John D. Lee, J. C. L. (John Calvin Lazelle) Smith, and Jesse Pierce Steele in June 1852. In 1858, a similar expedition also landed the pioneers in Cane Beds. Lee's party may have known Cane Beds as "Virgin Bottoms", being a valley near the Virgin River. The town was established in 1868 and was fully settled by Mormons by 1876, shortly before the first Mormon temple in Utah was finished. It lay along the trail from Lees Ferry to the new temple, traversed by Mormon settlers. The post office was established on June 15, 1917, with Cora H. Cox as postmistress. Cox was born Cora Haight, and had married into the Cox Mormon family. She had moved to Cane Beds with her young family on March 11, 1917.

A group of the Church of the Firstborn (a form of Mormonism), led by Ross LeBaron Jr., is based in Cane Beds. When the nearby Short Creek Community of fundamentalist Mormons broke up following the imprisonment of leader Warren Jeffs, several families moved to Cane Beds; others had been exiled there by Jeffs for not following his doctrine. Benjamin Bistline, Short Creek historian, moved to Cane Beds in his later years after renouncing fundamentalism. Polygamy persisted in the area in the 20th century due to its isolation, despite the practice being discontinued by the Church of Jesus Christ of Latter-day Saints. By 2009, most residents of Cane Beds were non-polygamous, though some still had connections with Colorado City.

== Geography ==
Cane Beds is located in northeastern Mohave County. It is in the Arizona Strip, 4 miles (6 km) south of the Arizona–Utah border, 7 miles (11 km) southeast of Colorado City, just south and west of the Vermilion Cliffs and Kaibab Indian Reservation, and about an hour and a half northwest of the Grand Canyon. It is close to the St. George, Utah metropolitan area and borders Cottonwood Point Wilderness. The Vermilion Cliffs at Cane Beds rise more than over 1,000 feet (300 m) above the community, to elevations of 6,210 and 6,443 feet (1,893 and 1,964 m) above sea level.

Land in Cane Beds includes that which is suitable for agriculture. Native fauna includes pronghorns and mule deer.

There are a variety of rock types in the strata at Cane Beds, including the Moenkopi Formation, Chinle Formation, and Shinarump Conglomerate. The town was studied in the Wheeler Survey.

== Demographics ==
Historical population
Census	Pop.	Note	%±
1910	5		—
1920	42		740.0%
1930	40		−4.8%
1940	36		−10.0%
2010	448		—
2020	466		4.0%
U.S. Decennial Census; Pre-1940 data from U.S. survey

As of the 2010 census, there were 448 people living in the CDP: 231 male and 217 female. 171 were 19 years old or younger, 78 were ages 20–34, 65 were between the ages of 35 and 49, 66 were between 50 and 64, and the remaining 68 were aged 65 and above. The median age was 29.2 years.

The racial makeup of the CDP was 94.4% White, 2.2% Native American, 0.7% Black or African American, 0.2% from Asian, and 1.3% from two or more races. 2% of the population were Hispanic or Latino of any race.

There were 142 households in the CDP, 106 family households (74.6%) and 36 non-family households (25.4%), with an average household size of 3.15. Of the family households, there were 84 married couples living together, 13 single fathers, and 9 single mothers. Of the non-family households, 31 were a single person living alone, 16 male and 15 female.

The CDP contained 168 housing units, of which 142 were occupied and 26 were vacant.

== Tourism ==
It is a popular hiking spot, with nearby scenic border trails. In 2016, a nurse who was hiking alone in Cane Beds fell 100 feet (30 m) and was not rescued for over a day, having landed in a canyon. Mountain and air rescue teams found her after the owners of her hotel noticed her absence and called the county sheriff, and she recovered in three months. She was initially treated at a regional medical center in Utah, before being transferred to the Mayo Clinic, where she worked. In 2014, a teenager from St. George fell 100 feet into a canyon on a hike with family, and died.

== Education ==
It is divided between Fredonia-Moccasin Unified School District, in nearby Coconino County, and Colorado City Unified School District, principally serving the former Short Creek Community. For four years in the 2000s, the Colorado City Unified School District was placed under state intervention because of the high rates of polygamy practiced in Colorado City and Hildale, Utah, the other towns in the district. Cane Beds students originally began to be educated in the Short Creek school district as there were only five students from the town, and districts needed eight students to justify a school, so the districts had been merged.

== Infrastructure ==
=== Transport ===
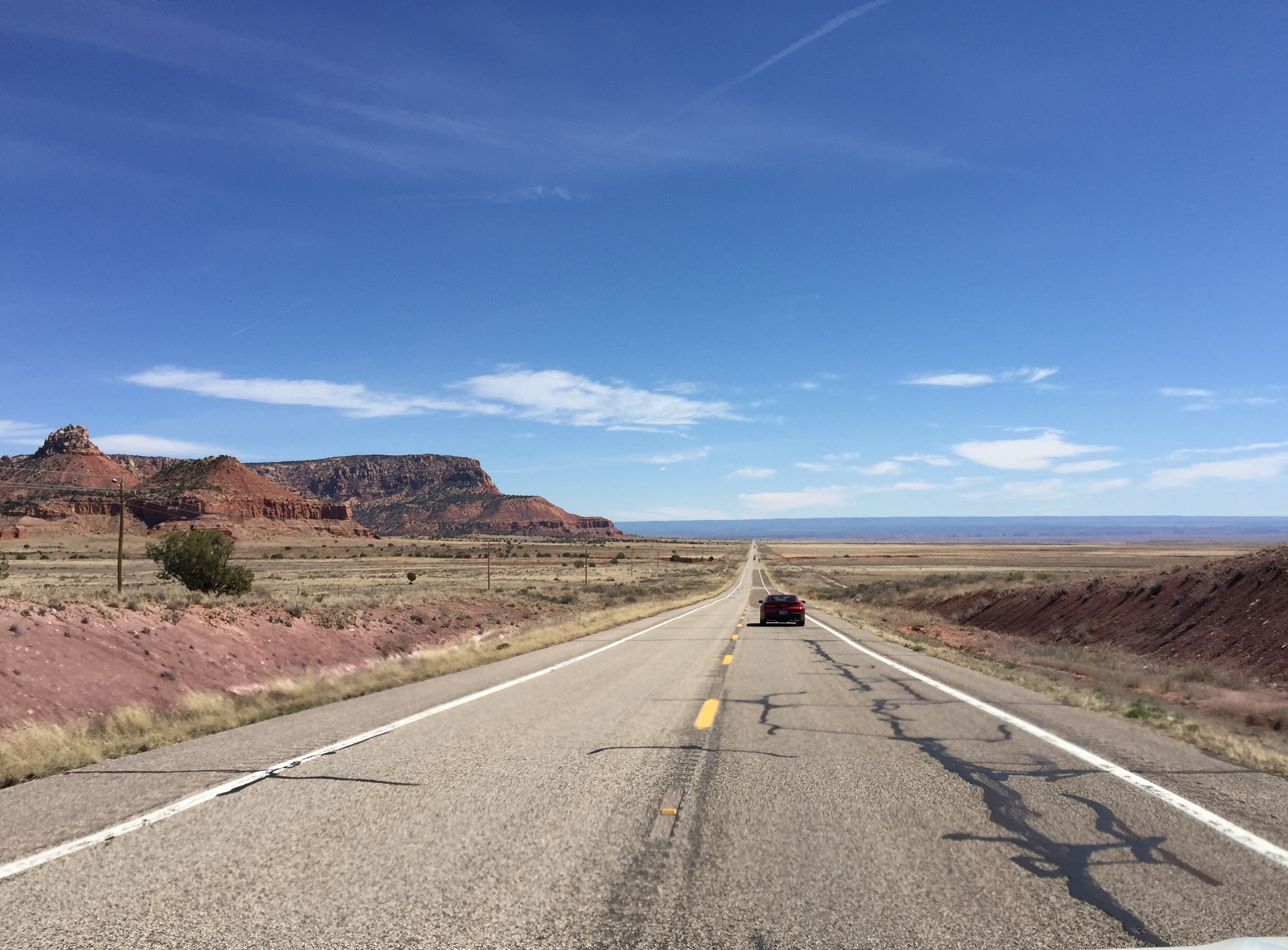
State Route 389 near Cane Beds

The nearest airport is Colorado City Municipal Airport; the nearest airport in regular service is St. George Regional Airport in St. George, Utah, approximately an hour away. The nearest international airport is Harry Reid International Airport in Las Vegas.

A two-mile stretch of Yellowstone Road in the Cane Beds area was renamed for LaVoy Finicum in 2017; while residents supported the motion, believing local man Finicum died defending his beliefs, the Mohave County Planning and Zoning Department only passed it 3–2, with the two opposing votes citing Finicum's lawlessness. Those who voted in favor said the move would celebrate the long history of Finicum's family in the area, not his armed activism. Reportedly, Finicum had previously requested that the stretch of road be named for him. It goes from Arizona State Route 389 (SR 389) to Cane Beds.

In 1950, there were efforts in the area to promote improvement of roads and infrastructure, and on March 14 that year a town hall-style meeting was held and an organization formed to better the community of Cane Beds and others nearby. Cane Beds Road is a stretch of county road 91 (former U.S. Route 91), and has a confluence with Interstate 15 (I-15) for about a mile. I-15 connects the town to Utah and Nevada. A railroad used to follow U.S. Route 89/89A where it passes by the town. SR 389 also passes close to Cane Beds.

=== Services ===
Cane Beds is supported by the Mohave County Sheriff's Office, as well as the Kane County Sheriff's Office in southern Utah.

Major hospitals serving Cane Beds residents are in Salt Lake City and Las Vegas. Local medical facilities are at the Creek Valley Health Clinic in Colorado City and Dixie Regional Medical Center in St. George.

The Cox Family Cemetery, also known as the Cane Beds Cemetery, is in the town. The town receives most of its local television from translators of Utah stations serving Hildale, with the exception of one Mohave County-owned translator of KSAZ-TV, the Fox station in Phoenix.

== Notable residents ==
- Benjamin Bistline, historian
- LaVoy Finicum, militant
- Grove Karl Gilbert, during his geologic expedition
- John D. Lee, pioneer, helped settle the area
