= Greenehaven, Arizona =

CDP in Coconino County, Arizona

- Census-designated place
- Location within Arizona Location within the United States
- Coordinates: 36°59′45″N 111°33′24″W
- Country: United States
- State: Arizona
- County: Coconino

Area
  - Total: 0.76 sq mi (1.98 km^{2})
  - Land: 0.76 sq mi (1.98 km^{2})
  - Water: 0 sq mi (0.00 km^{2})
- Elevation: 3,980 ft (1,210 m)

Population (2020)
  - Total: 381
  - Density: 497.2/sq mi (191.97/km^{2})
- Time zone: UTC-7 (MST)
  - Summer (DST): UTC-6 (MDT)
- ZIP Codes: 86036 (Marble Canyon); 86040 (Page)
- FIPS code: 04-29603
- GNIS feature ID: 2805214

Greenehaven is an unincorporated community and census-designated place (CDP) in Coconino County, Arizona, United States. It is bordered to the east, west, and south by the city of Page and to the north by the state of Utah. It was first listed as a CDP prior to the 2020 census.

It is within the Fredonia-Moccasin Unified School District.

== Demographics ==
Historical population
Census	Pop.	Note	%±
2020	381		—
U.S. Decennial Census
