= Benjamin Bistline =

American historian (1935–2016)

- Born: 21 April 1935; Logan, Utah, US
- Died: 25 June 2016 (aged 81); Hurricane, Utah, US
- Occupations: Historian, author
- Spouse: Annie Jessop
- Children: 14
- Writing career
- Subjects: Mormon fundamentalism Short Creek Community; FLDS
- Notable works: The Polygamists: A History of Colorado City, Arizona; Colorado City Polygamists: An Inside Look for the Outsider

Benjamin Granger Bistline (21 April 1935 – 25 June 2016) was an American historian of Mormon fundamentalism in Short Creek, a community of which he was a part.

Bistline wrote a book which documented the polygamists living in Hildale, Utah, and Colorado City, Arizona, and the creation of the Fundamentalist Church of Jesus Christ of Latter-Day Saints (FLDS Church).

== Life ==
Bistline was the sixth of 10 children born to John Anthony Bistline and Jenny Johnson Bistline (great-granddaughter of Benjamin F. Johnson and great-great-granddaughter of Frederick G. Williams). The majority of his ancestry came from Britain, Germany, and Switzerland.

Bistline's parents were practitioners of mainstream Mormonism, living in Providence when some residents of Cache County began to challenge the Church of Jesus Christ of Latter-day Saints' ban on polygamy. His parents were excommunicated in 1937. After the death of his oldest brother, his family moved to Short Creek in the winter of 1945. At age nine he became the first of his siblings baptized into the polygamous church.

After Bistline's father's death in 1949, his mother became the fifth wife of Rich Jessop (son of Joseph Smith Jessop). Bistline received permission from his stepfather to court one of his daughters on the condition Bistline would practice plural marriage. The courtship was interrupted by the Short Creek raid, but eventually Bistline married Annie Jessop on 24 June 1955. Subsequently, marriage assignment by FLDS leadership began, and Bistline was never called upon to take a second wife.

Bistline worked as a timber cutter, farmer, contractor and crane operator.

In the 1980s, Bistline began speaking out about the changes which church leaders were making. He and his family continued to live in a home owned by the United Effort Plan (UEP) — the land trust founded by FLDS members. Bistline was among the plaintiffs in a lawsuit filed by Short Creek residents who claimed they were evicted for trivial offenses. The lawsuit ended with an agreement that the trust could buy them out, or they could live in their homes for their lifetimes.

Bistline and his wife joined the mainstream LDS Church in 1992.

=== Later years ===
Bistline lived in Colorado City until 2003, when the UEP trust agreed to sell him a mobile home in nearby Cane Beds, Arizona at a low cost, and assisted in the relocation there.

Bistline was blind from around age 70 and suffered a variety diabetes-related ailments. His last days were spent at a healthcare center in Hurricane, Utah.

== Writings ==
Bistline wrote The Polygamists: A History of Colorado City, Arizona, which he self-published in 1998. Agreka Books republished it as a 432-page paperback in February 2004, and later issued a condensed, 236-page version, titled Colorado City Polygamists: An Inside Look for the Outsider.

=== Impact ===
Jon Krakauer cited the self-published version of The Polygamists as his source for Short Creek's history his book Under the Banner of Heaven: A Story of Violent Faith.

Sam Brower, the private detective who wrote Prophet's Prey (later made into a documentary of the same name), used the research in Bistline's books saying they "were like the standards."

Some people exiting the FLDS have read Bistline's books in an effort to understand what happened to their church. Bistline was quoted as saying: "That really makes me feel good, that I could help any of them see what was happening."
