= Colorado City Unified School District =

School district in Mohave County, Arizona, US

Coordinates: 36.995233°N 113.00335°W

El Capitan High School

Location
- 255 North Cottonwood Street; Colorado City, Arizona 86021; United States

Information
- School type: Public school
- School district: Colorado City Unified School District
- CEEB code: 030057
- Grades: 6-12
- Enrollment: High school: 124 (October 1, 2012); Total: 560 (2012-13)
- Colors: Royal blue and black
- Mascot: Eagles
- Website: Official website

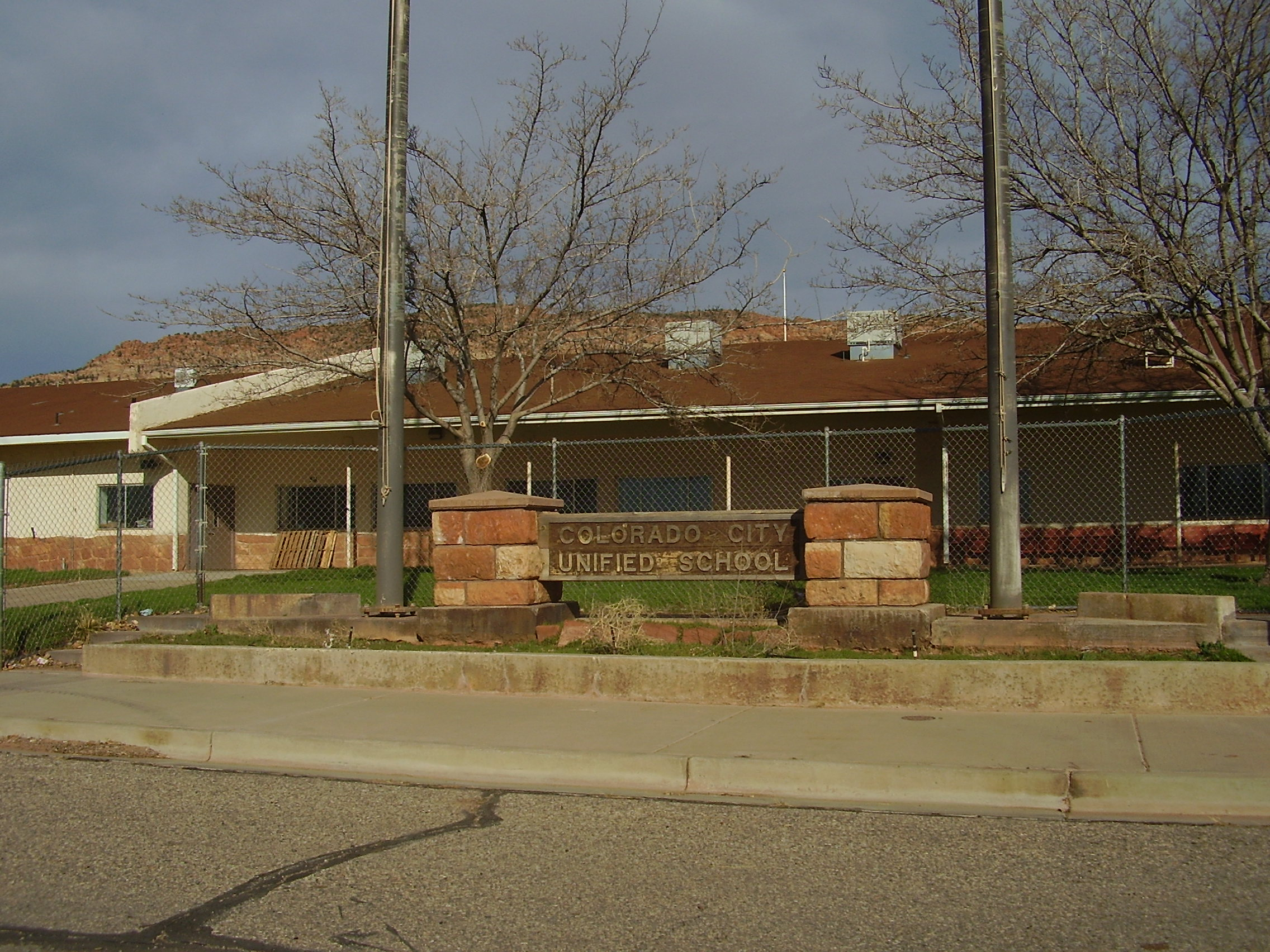
The previous Colorado City K-12 School

Colorado City Unified School District No. 14 is a school district headquartered in Colorado City, Arizona, serving students in the towns of Colorado City, Centennial Park and part of Cane Beds in rural Mohave County, and in Hildale, Utah. It operates Cottonwood Preschool, Cottonwood Elementary School, and El Capitan High School (grades 6–12).

== History ==
The Colorado City Unified School District had about 1,200 pupils in 2000, when Warren Jeffs ordered Fundamentalist Church of Jesus Christ of Latter Day Saints members to pull children out of public schools, claiming that the curriculum was offensive to God. After that, the number dwindled to fewer than 250. Most of the remaining students came from the Centennial Park group.

The district had over 100 employees and 18 administrators at the time Jeffs ordered followers out of the school. Almost all of the employees retained their jobs with no pay cuts. Jeffs did not order the fundamentalist church members who made up the majority of the school district's administrators to quit their positions. These administrators bought cars and an aircraft before the district went into bankruptcy. The Arizona state government attempted to take over the district in 2005 due to mismanagement. The state government appointed an observer as all FLDS members of the Colorado City Board of Education left their posts. The Arizona Department of Education later concluded that the district improved after state intervention.

The state government ended its investigation into the district in 2008. In 2010, ADE finally lifted its receivership of the district, with all debts paid off. Carol Timpson, the school's then-principal, also pushed for the name of the then-K-12 school to change, from Colorado City Public School to its present name.

Continued efforts by parents and Timpson began to get the school involved in athletics. The school became an associate member of the Arizona Interscholastic Association (it was turned down by the Utah High School Activities Association for the condition of its gymnasium), and its boys basketball program improved to an 18–4 record in 2010. As an associate member, however, it could not qualify for any playoffs. In October 2010, the Colorado City school board voted to make El Capitan a full member of the AIA. Fredonia High School, 33 miles away, allowed El Capitan students to play on its football team, among other programs the small school currently does not have.

In 2013, the expanding district bought three buildings, one of which it was already leasing, for $430,000 from a Utah-run community trust that controls $100 million in formerly FLDS-owned homes and property. The buildings will house 225 first- through third-grade students. The growth of the school district is largely attributed to a recovering economy and hundreds leaving the FLDS church.

== Student body ==
During the 2012–2013 school year, the district had 560 students (150 in the high school), up from 475 in the 2011-12 year; none of the students were FLDS Church members. In 2013 Centennial Park residents and Colorado City residents made up about 50% and 33% of the student body, respectively, while the remaining 17% originated from other communities.
