= Kanab Creek Trail =

Hiking trail in the Grand Canyon National Park

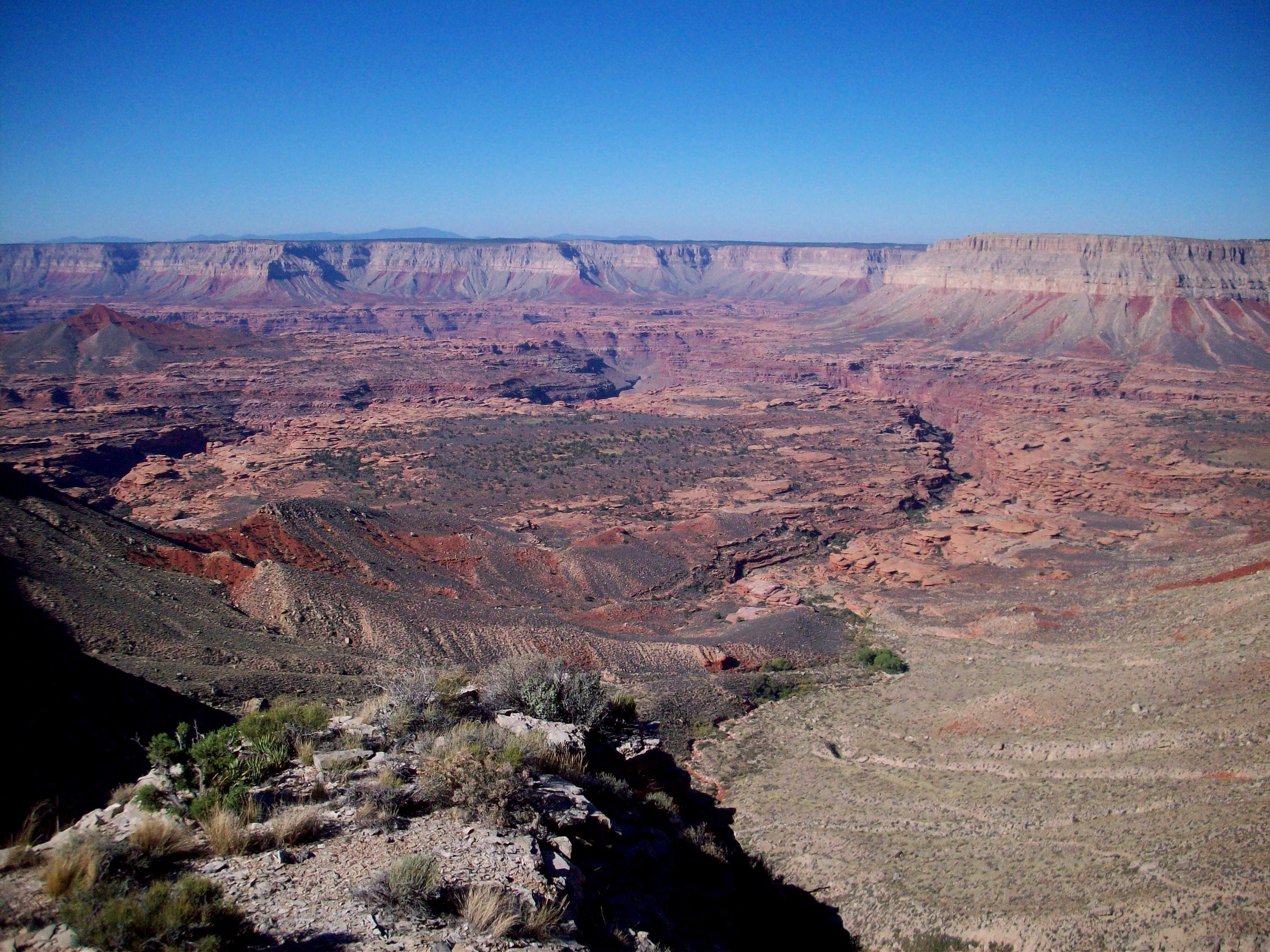
- Kanab Canyon
- Location: 36.3923°N 112.6296°W Grand Canyon National Park, Arizona, United States
- Use: Hiking
- Sights: Grand Canyon
- Hazards: Severe Weather; Overexertion; Dehydration; Flash Flood

The Kanab Creek Trail is a hiking trail on the North Rim of the Grand Canyon National Park, located in the U.S. state of Arizona. It is named after the adjacent Kanab Creek.

== See also ==
- The Grand Canyon
- List of trails in Grand Canyon National Park

== Photo gallery ==
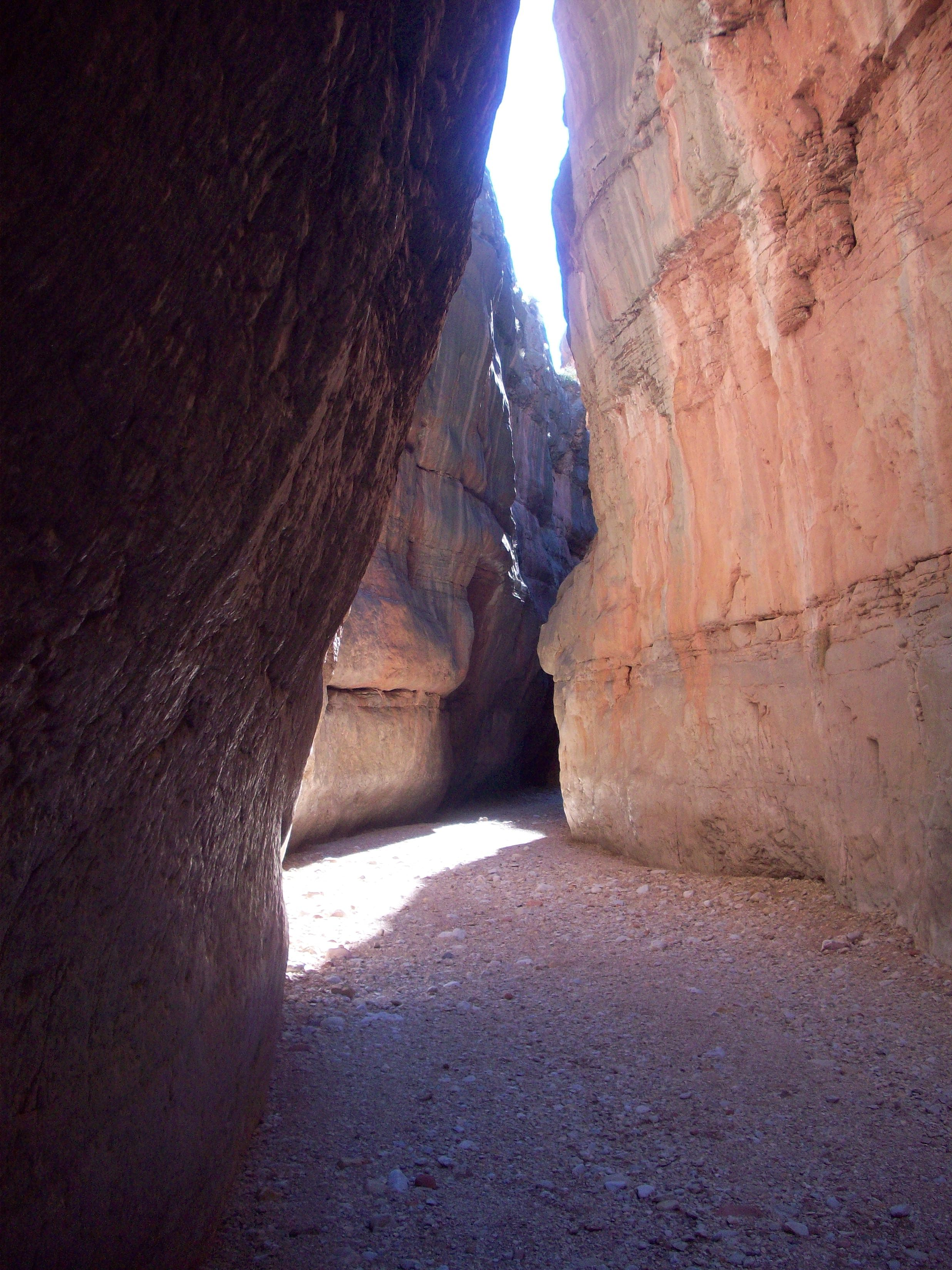
Jumpup Canyon

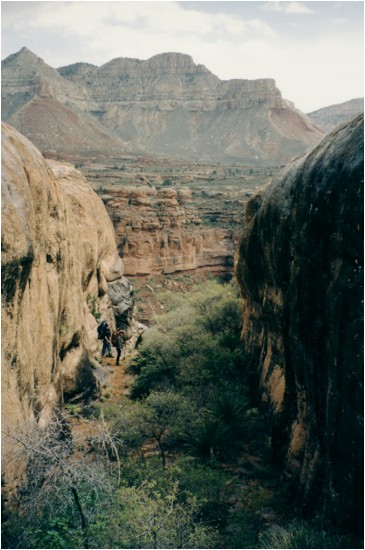
Kanab Creek

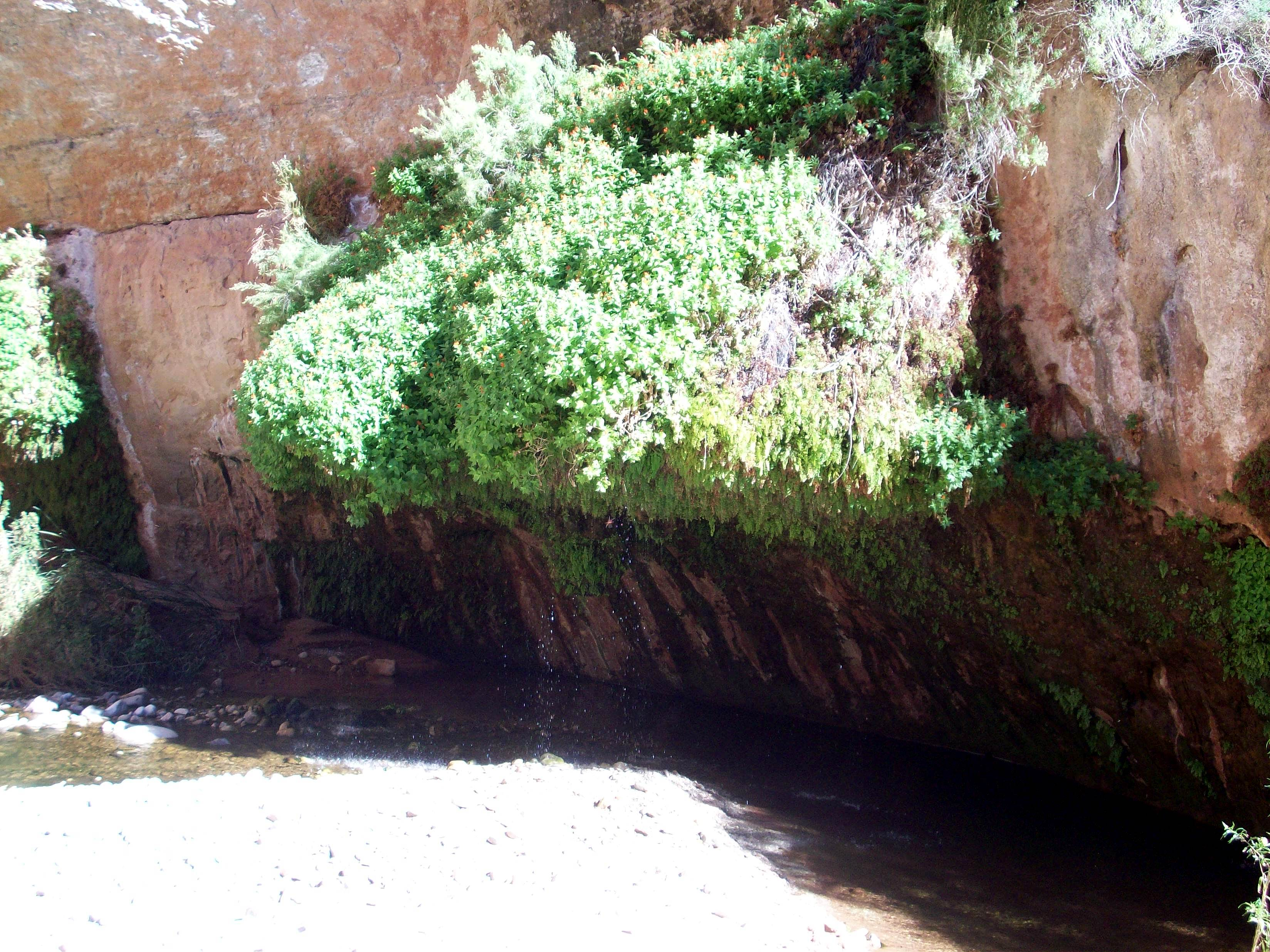
Showerbath Spring
