= Cottonwood Point Wilderness =

Protected area in Arizona

- IUCN category Ib (wilderness area)
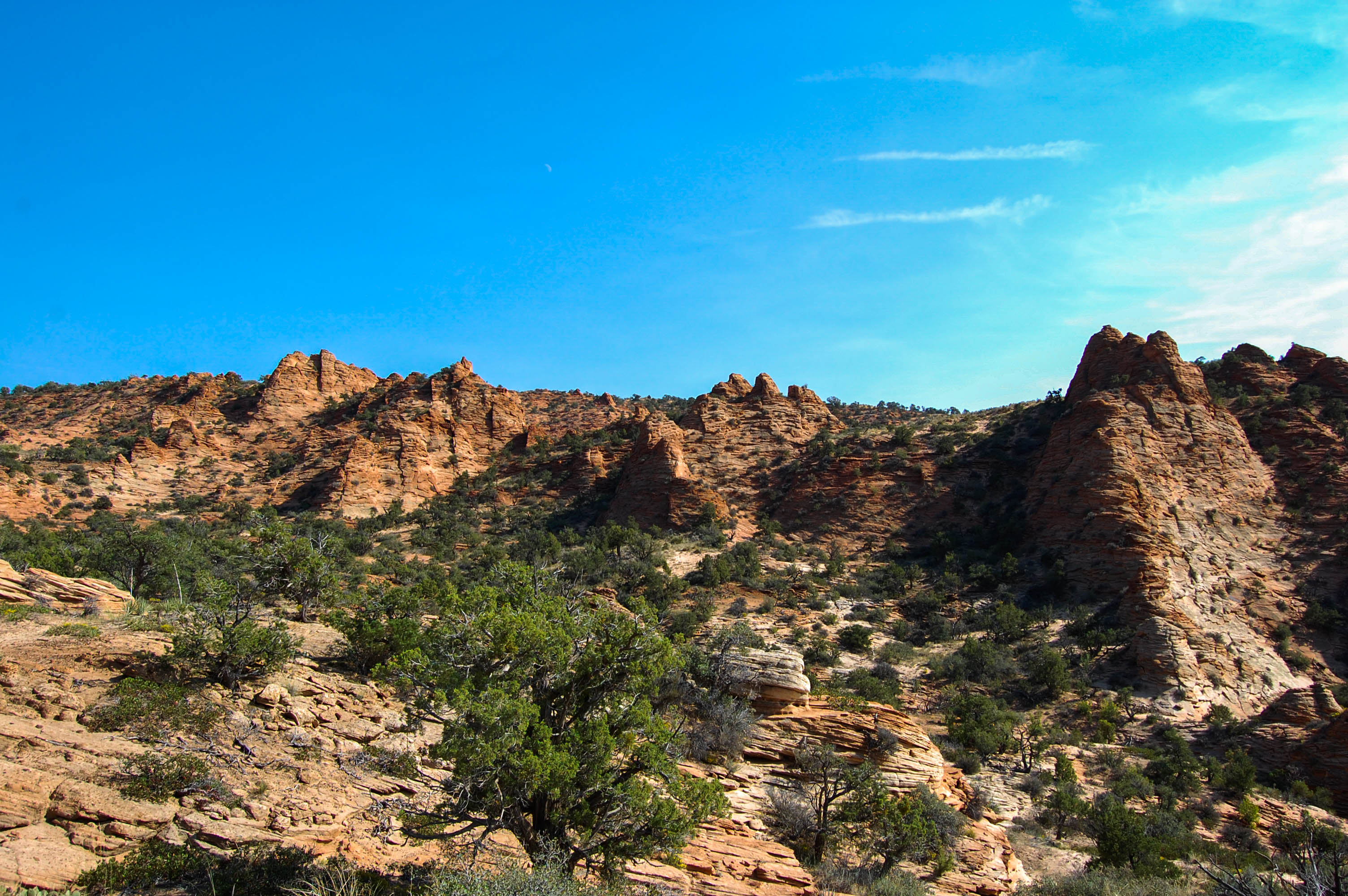

- Location within the United States
- Location: Mohave County, Arizona, USA
- Nearest city: Colorado City, Arizona
- Coordinates: 36°58′54″N 112°54′54″W
- Area: 6,860 acres (28 km^{2})
- Established: 1984
- Governing body: U.S. Department of Interior Bureau of Land Management

Cottonwood Point Wilderness is a protected wilderness area on the Arizona Strip in the U.S. state of Arizona. The area consists of two "peninsulas" dividing Cottonwood Canyon, covered with pinyon, juniper, and sagebrush. The high point stands at 6322 feet (1926 m) on the western peninsula, rising from the Arizona-Utah border.

The Cottonwood Point Wilderness was established in 1984 under the Arizona Wilderness Act becoming part of the National Wilderness Preservation System and is managed by the Bureau of Land Management. Canaan Mountain Wilderness lies contiguously to the north across the Arizona-Utah border.

== See also ==
- List of U.S. Wilderness Areas
