= Fredonia High School (Arizona) =

Public high school

Coordinates: 36.9515°N 112.5216°W

Location
- 221 E Hortt St; Fredonia, Arizona 86022; United States

Information
- School type: Public high school
- School district: Fredonia-Moccasin Unified School District
- CEEB code: 030125
- Principal: Joe B. Wright
- Teaching staff: 7.16 (FTE)
- Grades: 7-12
- Enrollment: 78 (2023–2024)
- Student to teacher ratio: 10.89
- Colors: Royal blue and white
- Mascot: Lynx
- Website: www.fredonia.org/District/Department/1-middle-high-school

Fredonia High School is a high school in Fredonia, Arizona under the jurisdiction of the Fredonia-Moccasin Unified School District, whose only other school is the K-8 Fredonia Elementary. Nick Bartlett, the principal, is also district superintendent.

== Notable alumni ==
- John Garcia, star of National Geographic Channel's DogTown series, trainer for Best Friends Animal Society
