= Fredonia, Arizona =

Community in Coconino County, Arizona

- Town
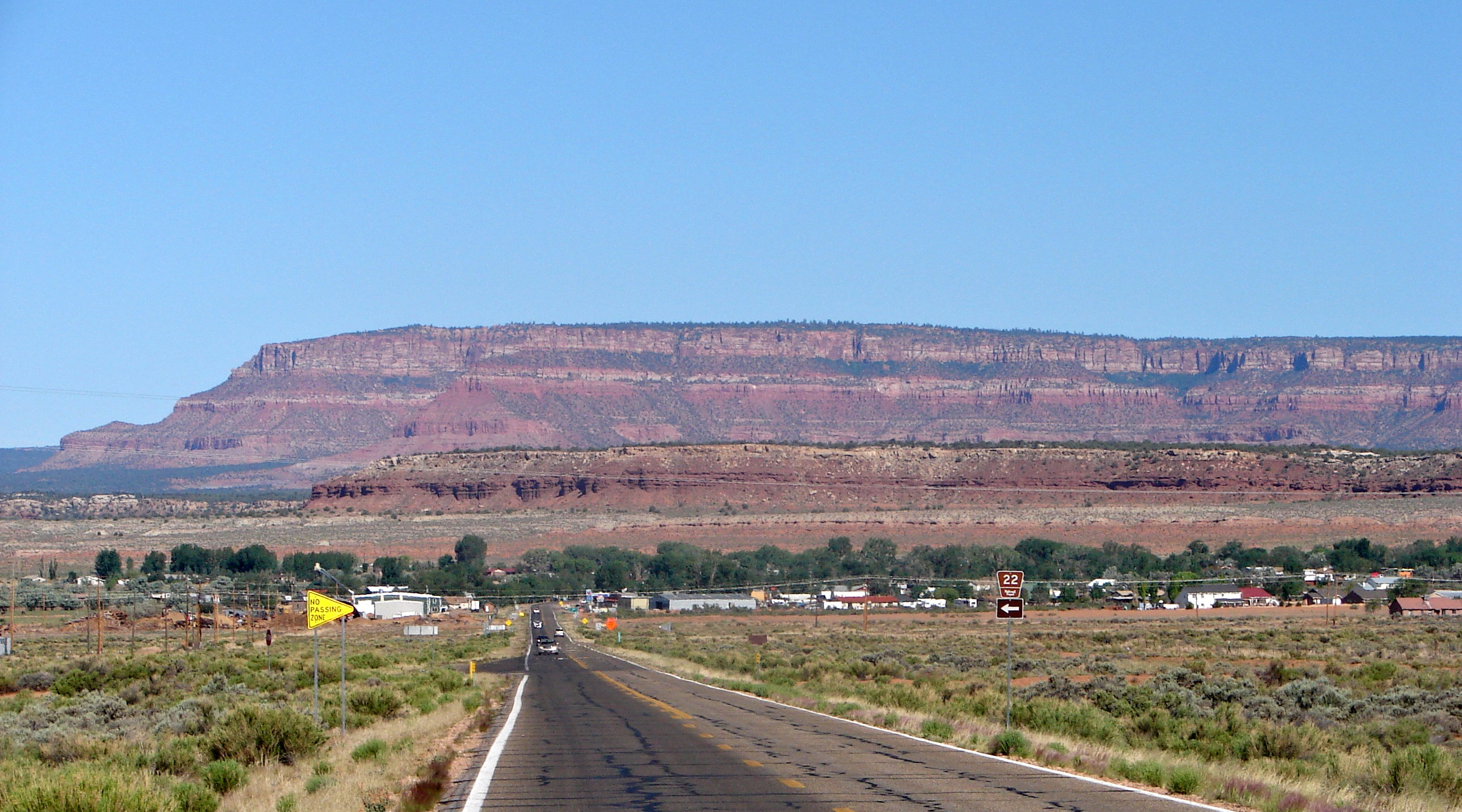

- Location of Fredonia in Coconino County, Arizona.

- Location in the United States
- Coordinates: 36°58′50″N 112°31′05″W
- Country: United States
- State: Arizona
- County: Coconino

Area
  - Total: 8.88 sq mi (22.99 km^{2})
  - Land: 8.88 sq mi (22.99 km^{2})
  - Water: 0 sq mi (0.00 km^{2})
- Elevation: 4,725 ft (1,440 m)

Population (2020)
  - Total: 1,323
  - Density: 149.1/sq mi (57.55/km^{2})
- Time zone: UTC-7 (MST)
- ZIP codes: 86022, 86052
- Area code: 928
- FIPS code: 04-25720
- GNIS feature ID: 2412657
- Website: www.fredoniaaz.gov

Fredonia is a town in Coconino County, Arizona, United States. As of the 2020 census, Fredonia had a population of 1,323. Fredonia is the gateway to the North Rim of the Grand Canyon.

== History ==
Fredonia was laid out in 1886. Its name is said to mean the "land of free women."

The town suffered economically from the re-routing of U.S. 89 in 1960. While the highway previously went through Fredonia, it was re-routed north of the Glen Canyon dam, and the town lost several businesses due to a drop in traffic.

Senator Barry Goldwater gave the commencement at Fredonia High School in 1964.

Kaibab Forest Products was the major industry in town until 1995, when it closed and laid off 200 workers. It had employed up to 400 workers in 1988. The Arizona One mine is also located nearby.

== Demographics ==
Historical population
Census	Pop.	Note	%±
1960	643		—
1970	798		24.1%
1980	1,040		30.3%
1990	1,207		16.1%
2000	1,036		−14.2%
2010	1,314		26.8%
2020	1,323		0.7%
U.S. Decennial Census

=== 2020 census ===
As of the 2020 census, Fredonia had a population of 1,323. The median age was 39.1 years. 24.7% of residents were under the age of 18 and 18.3% of residents were 65 years of age or older. For every 100 females there were 92.6 males, and for every 100 females age 18 and over there were 92.3 males age 18 and over.

0.0% of residents lived in urban areas, while 100.0% lived in rural areas.

There were 490 households in Fredonia, of which 29.6% had children under the age of 18 living in them. Of all households, 48.6% were married-couple households, 20.6% were households with a male householder and no spouse or partner present, and 25.7% were households with a female householder and no spouse or partner present. About 32.2% of all households were made up of individuals and 18.6% had someone living alone who was 65 years of age or older.

There were 554 housing units, of which 11.6% were vacant. The homeowner vacancy rate was 0.8% and the rental vacancy rate was 10.1%.

Racial composition as of the 2020 census
Race	Number	Percent
White	1,140	86.2%
Black or African American	6	0.5%
American Indian and Alaska Native	124	9.4%
Asian	3	0.2%
Native Hawaiian and Other Pacific Islander	0	0.0%
Some other race	12	0.9%
Two or more races	38	2.9%
Hispanic or Latino (of any race)	50	3.8%

=== 2000 census ===
As of the census of 2000, there were 1,036 people, 359 households, and 287 families residing in the town. The population density was 139.7 inhabitants per square mile (53.9/km^{2}). There were 455 housing units at an average density of 61.4 per square mile (23.7/km^{2}). The racial makeup of the town was 85.7% White, 1.1% Black or African American, 11.4% Native American, 0.4% from other races, and 1.5% from two or more races. 1.5% of the population were Hispanic or Latino of any race.

There were 359 households, out of which 37.9% had children under the age of 18 living with them, 65.5% were married couples living together, 10.0% had a female householder with no husband present, and 19.8% were non-families. 15.9% of all households were made up of individuals, and 5.3% had someone living alone who was 65 years of age or older. The average household size was 2.89 and the average family size was 3.25.

In the town, the age distribution of the population shows 32.3% under the age of 18, 6.2% from 18 to 24, 27.7% from 25 to 44, 22.7% from 45 to 64, and 11.1% who were 65 years of age or older. The median age was 35 years. For every 100 females, there were 104.3 males. For every 100 females age 18 and over, there were 98.0 males.

The median income for a household in the town was $30,288, and the median income for a family was $30,913. Males had a median income of $24,904 versus $19,554 for females. The per capita income for the town was $13,309. About 12.3% of families and 15.0% of the population were below the poverty line, including 25.4% of those under age 18 and 3.2% of those age 65 or over.

== Geography ==
Fredonia is located in the Arizona Strip, the portion of Arizona lying north of the Colorado River, and is within a few miles of the Utah border. According to the United States Census Bureau, the town has a total area of 7.4 square miles (19 km^{2}), all land.

Fredonia is also located within a short distance of other national parks, national monuments, state parks, and scenic outdoor recreation spots.

=== Climate ===
Climate data for Fredonia, Arizona
Month	Jan	Feb	Mar	Apr	May	Jun	Jul	Aug	Sep	Oct	Nov	Dec	Year
Record high °F (°C)	78 (26)	72 (22)	83 (28)	86 (30)	96 (36)	107 (42)	110 (43)	104 (40)	99 (37)	96 (36)	78 (26)	70 (21)	110 (43)
Mean daily maximum °F (°C)	46.2 (7.9)	51.6 (10.9)	59.7 (15.4)	68.5 (20.3)	77.4 (25.2)	87.3 (30.7)	93.7 (34.3)	90.7 (32.6)	84.2 (29.0)	72.2 (22.3)	58.5 (14.7)	47.9 (8.8)	69.8 (21.0)
Mean daily minimum °F (°C)	19.5 (−6.9)	22.1 (−5.5)	26.0 (−3.3)	31.9 (−0.1)	38.5 (3.6)	46.6 (8.1)	55.4 (13.0)	54.2 (12.3)	45.4 (7.4)	35.4 (1.9)	26.1 (−3.3)	20.1 (−6.6)	35.1 (1.7)
Record low °F (°C)	−20 (−29)	−15 (−26)	−2 (−19)	2 (−17)	18 (−8)	26 (−3)	34 (1)	33 (1)	26 (−3)	9 (−13)	0 (−18)	−18 (−28)	−20 (−29)
Average precipitation inches (mm)	1.13 (29)	0.80 (20)	0.88 (22)	0.62 (16)	0.48 (12)	0.29 (7.4)	0.73 (19)	1.21 (31)	0.89 (23)	0.90 (23)	0.77 (20)	0.97 (25)	9.67 (247.4)
Average snowfall inches (cm)	7.0 (18)	3.5 (8.9)	3.5 (8.9)	1.1 (2.8)	0 (0)	0 (0)	0 (0)	0 (0)	0 (0)	0.2 (0.51)	1.3 (3.3)	4.8 (12)	21.4 (54.41)
Average precipitation days (≥ 0.01 in)	5	4	4	3	3	2	4	5	3	4	3	4	44
Source: Western Regional Climate Center

== Education ==
Fredonia is a part of the Fredonia-Moccasin Unified School District. Two schools, Fredonia Elementary School and Fredonia High/Middle School, serve the town.

== See also ==
- List of localities in Arizona
- Pipe Spring National Monument
