= Thollander =

Thollander is a Swedish surname. Notable people with the surname include:

- Earl Thollander, artist
- Gunnar Thollander, member of the parliament of Sweden
- Jonathan Thollander, professional ice hockey player
- David Thollander, Vice President of Muvico Theaters
