= Edwin I. Power Jr. =

American aviator & businessman (1922-2017)

Edwin I. Power
- Born: September 9, 1922; Unknown
- Died: March 30, 2017 (aged 94); Kenwood, California, United States
- Education: Vacaville High School, Vacaville, California
- Occupation(s): Aviator; Businessman
- Parents: Edwin I. Power Sr. (father); Helen Harbison Power (mother)

Edwin I. Power Jr. (a.k.a. Ed Power Jr.) was the son of Edwin I. Power Sr. and Helen Harbison Power, the founders of the Nut Tree in Vacaville, California. Ed Power Jr., a pilot and aviation enthusiast, was responsible for the creation of the Nut Tree Airport.

== Early life ==
Ed Power Jr. was born on the landmark Harbison Ranch in Vacaville, California to parents Edwin I. Power Sr. and Helen Harbison Power. Power attended Vacaville High School and served in the U.S. Air Corps as a mechanic on B-17 bombers. After returning from his World War II service, Power learned to fly on the G.I. bill and became "a national legend in aviation."

== Nut Tree and the Nut Tree Airport ==
Ed Power Jr. was one of the second-generation ownership partners of the Nut Tree, along with his brother Robert Power and sister Mary Helen Power. Ed Power Jr. "was the visionary for much of the world-famous institution." A trip to Denmark in 1957 gave Power and Nut Tree design director Don Birrell the idea of designing the Nut Tree's patio area to resemble the Tivoli Gardens with special lighting and kiosks. Power commissioned Charles Eames to design the Nut Tree's furniture. Power also created and built the first wooden "Hobby Horses," a signature attraction of the Nut Tree. Power is credited with "creating the Nut Tree Airport by way of its first landing strip."
