= Harbison House =

Harbison House may refer to:

- Harbison House (Vacaville, California), located on the site of the Nut Tree
- Harbison House (Scotts Station, Kentucky), listed on the National Register of Historic Places
- Harbison House (Shelbyville, Kentucky), listed on the National Register of Historic Places
- Harbison College President's Home, Abbeville, South Carolina, listed on the National Register of Historic Places
- Thomas Grant Harbison House, Highlands, North Carolina, listed on the NRHP in Macon County
- Culbertson–Harbison Farm, Nyesville, Pennsylvania, listed on the NRHP in Franklin County
