= Ruth Dicker =

American painter (1919–2004)

- Born: Ruth Doerschuk; March 9, 1919; Niagara Falls, New York
- Died: December 2, 2004 (aged 85); California
- Education: New York School of Fine and Applied Art
- Known for: Painting
- Spouse: Ralph Dicker
- Awards: American Association of University Women's "Women Artist of the Year."

Ruth Doerschuk Dicker (March 9, 1919 – December 2, 2004) was a California painter of landscapes. She primarily lived in New York City, Palo Alto, and Santa Rosa.

== Personal life ==
Ruth Doerschuk was born in Niagara Falls, New York, on March 9, 1919. She had a sister named Anne. She received private lessons in oil painting between the ages of nine and twelve.

Doerschuk met her husband, Ralph Dicker, in New York and they were married on August 25, 1942, in California. They raised their sons Thomas and Scott in Palo Alto, California.

== Education ==
She went to Salem Academy boarding school. She studied art history and painting and graduated from College of William and Mary in 1940. She moved to New York City where she studied at the New York School of Fine and Applied Art and at the Art Students League of New York under Ernest Fiene.

== Career ==
While in New York, Dicker worked as a freelance illustrator, a fashion model and a draftsman for Sperry Gyroscope. In 1970, Dicker moved to Bennett Ridge in Santa Rosa, California, where she found her most recognizable style in depicting the landscapes of Sonoma County. Her style includes vibrant acrylic colors, splatters of paint and strips of wood covered in rice-paper to give dimensionality and texture.

Throughout her career, her work was shown in galleries, museums, corporate offices in New York City and in and around the San Francisco Bay area. She participated in one woman or group shows at the Legion of Honor, the Oakland Museum of California, and Stanford University.

After her husband died in 1980, she enjoyed the most productive years of her career. In 1983, Dicker traveled with a group of California artists led by Earl Thollander to China. She enjoyed the art of the Southwest United States and often traveled to Santa Fe, New Mexico.

Her notable paintings include the large paintings depicting the seasons in the dining room of The Nut Tree (now closed) in Vacaville, California, and a 24-foot-wide (7.3 m) wood mural at the Yosemite Art and Education Center, now the Valley Wilderness Center.

Dicker died on December 2, 2004, when she was living Santa Rosa, California.

== Awards ==
Dicker was named American Association of University Women's "Women Artist of the Year". In 1964, she won the Society of Women Artists' President's prize at the San Francisco Museum of Art. At the De Saisset Museum she won first and second prizes.

== Collections ==
Dicker's art is in many private and public collections in the United States and abroad, including:

- Bank of America
- Barnes-Hine Pharmaceutical
- Crown Zellerbach
- Harrah's, Reno, Nevada
- Price Waterhouse Coopers
- Wells Fargo Bank
- Case Study House 26, San Rafael

== Exhibitions ==
- 1961, Impressions of Trees - Stanford Research Institute, Stanford, California
- 1962, the little studio, New York City, New York
- Gallery House, Menlo Park, California
- Quay Gallery, Tiburon, California
- 1962, "Forth Winter Invitational Exhibition", Legion of Honor, San Francisco, California
- 1964, The Nut Tree, Vacaville, California
- 1964, "San Francisco Women Artists Fortieth Annual Exhibition", awarded first prize - San Francisco Museum of Art
- 1966, "85th Annual Exhibition", San Francisco Museum of Art, San Francisco, California
- 1968, Ampex Corporation, Hayward, California
- 1974, The Nut Tree, Vacaville, California
- "Painted Wood Constructions and Assemblages", The Marshall Gallery, Tomales Bay, California
- Arlene Lind Gallery, San Francisco, California
- 1983, Piper Sonoma
- 1983, Marin County Civic Center, San Rafael, California
- 1985, California Museum of Art, Santa Rosa, California
- 1986, Spring Invitational Exhibition - Alden Arts Gallery, Santa Rosa, California
- 1987, "An Exhibition of bas relief painting", Sterling Vineyards
- 1987, "Vineyards and Beyond", Kaiser Arts Center Gallery, Oakland, California
- 1989, The Nut Tree, Vacaville, California
- 1993, The Nut Tree, Vacaville, California
- 1994, Marin County Civic Center, San Rafael, California
- 1995, "Indian Summer", Danny & Company, Santa Rosa, California
- 2001, Mixed Media Paintings - Solano Bank
- 2003, "Nut Tree Artist Reunion", Vacaville Museum, Vacaville, California
- 2003, "12th ROTATION, Honoring the Art of Ruth Dicker", Next Level Communications
