= Nut Tree Railroad =

Coordinates: 38.37031°N 121.96213°W

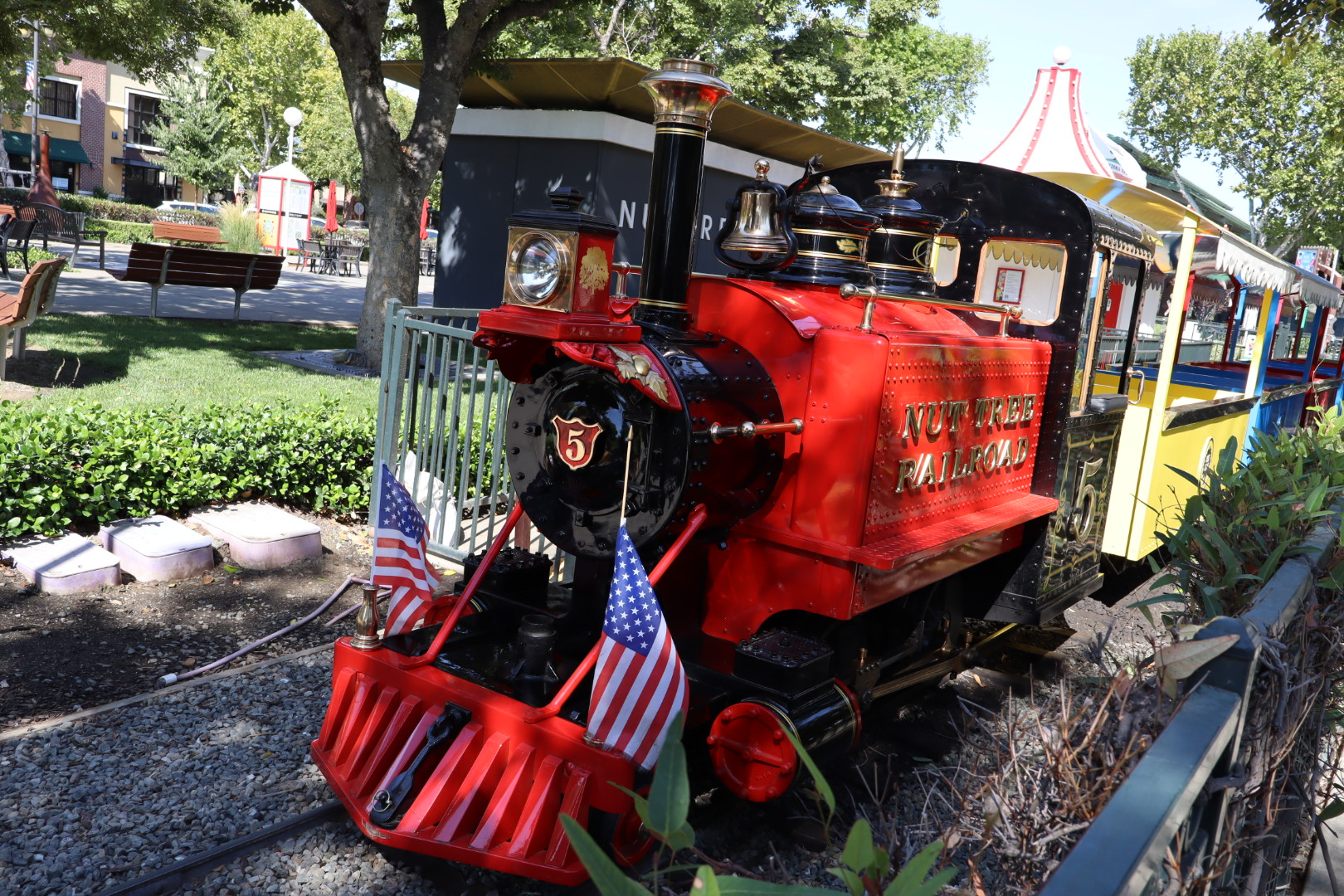
Nut Tree 5 in 2026 at the new plaza

The Nut Tree Railroad is a 2 ft (610 mm) gauge railroad within the Nut Tree Plaza in Vacaville, California.

== History ==
=== The original Nut Tree Railroad ===
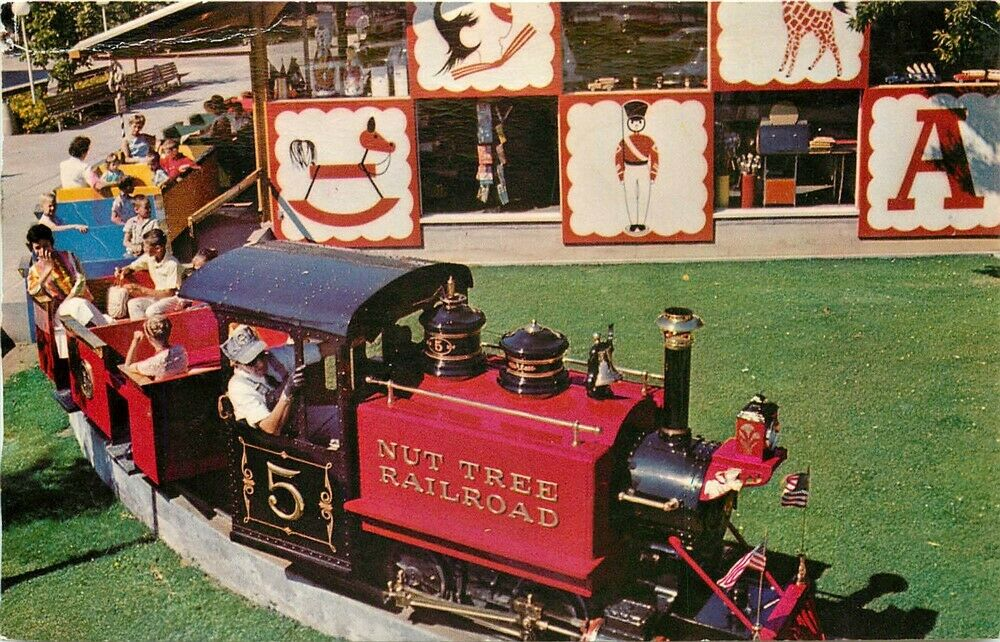
The Nut Tree Railroad train leaving the colorful Toy Shop on its way through the orchard to the Nut Tree Airport

The Nut Tree Railroad was started in 1953 to serve the customers of Vacaville's Nut Tree Restaurant. Two years later its tracks were extended to the Nut Tree Airport to shuttle pilots to and from the restaurant. The railroad's main station was the Nut Tree Toy Shop where riders would purchase their tickets. Famous riders of the Nut Tree train included Ronald Reagan, Shirley Temple, Fred MacMurray, California governor Pat Brown, champion boxer Max Baer, Bozo the Clown, and Julia Child. Following the 1955 expansion of the Nut Tree Railroad to the Nut Tree Airport, the route at the original Nut Tree included a tunnel and a bridge.

=== Closure and reopening ===
When the Nut Tree closed in 1996, the train was driven into the railroad's tunnel and sealed in. During those years the train, Engine Number 5, was purchased by the City of Vacaville to ensure its preservation while many of the other buildings did not survive. As developer after developer tried to purchase the Nut Tree property from Vacaville, each one was told it could have the land as long as the Nut Tree Railroad was reopened. Finally in 2006, developer Snell & Co. reopened the railroad in the Nut Tree Family Park. In January 2009, the Family Park closed again.

In July 2009, developer Westrust bought the property and reopened the Nut Tree Railroad, adding a carousel and children's park to the Nut Tree Plaza that August. As of 2021, the Nut Tree Train is back and sporting an environmentally friendly "green" bio-diesel engine.
