= Don Birrell =

American graphic designer and museum director (b. 1922, d. 2006)

Don R. Birrell (1922–2006) was director of the Crocker Art Museum in Sacramento, California, from 1951 to 1953, and was the design director for the Nut Tree in Vacaville, California, from 1953 until his retirement in 1990. In addition to his design work at the Nut Tree, Birrell also created the Vacaville city logo, the logo for the Vacaville Reporter newspaper, and the artwork seen on the side of Raley's Supermarkets trucks. Birrell was also a painter of landscape watercolors. His house on Kendal Street in Vacaville was famously filled with examples of his design work for the Nut Tree.

== Early life and education ==
Don Birrell was born December 6, 1922, in Corona, California. He grew up in Sacramento, California, and attended Sacramento City College.

== Director of the Crocker Art Museum ==
Birrell served as the director of the Crocker Art Museum in Sacramento from 1951 to 1953. In 1951, he organized an exhibition of the work of artist Martín Ramírez at the Crocker Art Museum. In 1952, the drawing "Madonna in Landscape with Cars" by Ramírez was received by Charles Eames and Ray Eames in a letter from Don Birrell.

== Design director for the Nut Tree ==
In 1953, Birrell became design director for the Nut Tree restaurant in Vacaville, where he remained until his retirement in 1990. The Nut Tree had its own design department headed by him. In 1960, Birrell mounted an exhibition of paintings by Wayne Thiebaud that were inspired by Thiebaud's travels to Mexico.

== Graphic design style: The Nut Tree look ==
Birrell's graphic design style can be characterized as minimalist, colorful, and highly abstracted. He is credited with creating the Nut Tree's "look", from graphic design to food presentations to menu design.

Birrell was admired and was influenced by a number of artists and designers, notably: Charles and Ray Eames, Maynard Dixon, Rockwell Kent, Grant Wood, Saul Bass, Herbert Bayer, Alexander Calder, Cassandre, William Moore, Piet Mondrian, Alexander Girard, László Moholy-Nagy, Thomas Moran, George Nelson, Paul Rand, and Charles Sheeler.

The Vacaville Museum exhibited a retrospective of Birrell's work, Don Birrell by Design in 2003.

== Later life and death ==
Birrell died on June 30, 2006. Following his death, the July 5, 2006, meeting of the Solano County Board of Supervisors adjourned in his memory.

== Logos designed by Don Birrell ==
Logo	Date	Image	Description
Nut Tree Logo (New)	1987		
Coffee Tree Restaurant Logo	1964		
Vacaville, California City Logo	1989		
Vacaville Reporter Logo	1962		
Vacaville Fiesta Days Logo	1963		
Raley's Supermarkets trucks	Unknown		
Vacaville/Dixon Greenbelt Logo	Unknown		
Hearn Construction Logo	Unknown		
Vacaville Performing Arts Theater Logo	1998		
Solano Land Trust Logo	2006		

== Artwork by Don Birrell ==
Title	Date	Medium	Description
Early Sacramento Gothic 3rd and T St	1946	Graphite	
Old Ships Never Die	1964	Liquitex	
Mendocino Light	1983	Watercolor with ink line	
Cordelia Skyline	1985	Watercolor	
Pololu Overlook, Kohala	1996	Watercolor	
A Taste of Hawaii	1998	Watercolor	
Shiprock	1998	Watercolor	
Modern Landscape (Title Unknown)	1998	Watercolor	
Renaissance Vineyard & Winery	2001	Watercolor	
Buck Avenue Fantasy	Unknown	Watercolor	
Old Rocky	Unknown	Watercolor	
VacaValley	Unknown	Watercolor	
Bodega Bay	Unknown	Watercolor	

== Other designs by Don Birrell ==
Item	Date	Medium	Description
Nut Tree Freeway Sign	1964	Concrete and Glass	Three-part freeway sign
Nut Tree Restaurant Receipt	Unknown		Miscellaneous graphics on restaurant receipt
Coffee Tree Restaurant Menu	Unknown		Restaurant menu
Nut Tree Play Wall	Unknown	Unknown	Children's play wall with animal characters
Nut Tree Hobby Horse Plans	Unknown	Unknown	
Vacaville Christmas Tree Star	1983	Stainless Steel	Collaboration with craftsman Lee Kollorz
Nut Tree Restaurant Dinner Menu	1979	Unknown	Restaurant menu
Nut Tree Restaurant Menu	1960s	Unknown	Restaurant menu
Nut Tree Dinner Menu	1968	Unknown	Restaurant menu
Vacaville Area General Plan	1957	Unknown	Brochure
Nut Tree Restaurant Aviary	Unknown	Unknown	Glass aviary for exotic birds
