= Anna Doerschuk =

American college administrator (1879-1974)

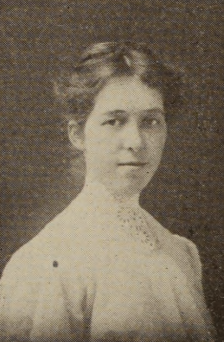
- Doerschuk, from the 1907 yearbook of Oberlin College
- Born: Anna Beatrice Doerschuk; August 11, 1879; Shanesville, Ohio, U.S.
- Died: April 21, 1974 (aged 94); New Wilmington, Pennsylvania, U.S.
- Other name: Beatrice Doerschuk
- Occupations: College administrator, educator
- Relatives: Ruth Dicker (niece)

Anna Beatrice Doerschuk (August 11, 1879 – April 21, 1974) was an American college administrator. She was director of education at Sarah Lawrence College from 1928 to 1946.

== Early life and education ==
Doerschuk was born in Shanesville, Ohio, the daughter of John Doerschuk and Mary Catherine Zahner Doerschuk. Her father was a banker. She graduated from Oberlin College in 1906, and completed further studies at Teachers College, Columbia University during World War I.

Her brother Herbert Marion Doerschuk was the electrical engineer for whom the Doerschuk Site, an archaeological site in North Carolina, is named. His daughter Ruth Dicker was a noted artist.

== Career ==
Doerschuk taught at Michigan Seminary and the Oxford College for Women in Ohio after college. She was associate dean of women at Oberlin College from 1911 to 1916. She was assistant director of New York City's Bureau of Vocational Information from 1918 to 1927, and organized the Bureau of Vocational Guidance for the YWCA. "Our whole present movement in education is based on recognizing that individual students have different needs, different abilities, different capacities, and different interests," she explained of her vocational work, to an academic audience in 1927.

Doerschuk became director of education at Sarah Lawrence College in 1928, and retired from Sarah Lawrence in 1946. Her successor as director, Esther Mohr Raushenbush, became the president of Sarah Lawrence in 1965.

She became a member of the Oberlin College Board of Trustees in 1926, and was active in the Oberlin Women's Club of New York. In 1952 Doerschuk received the Alumni Medal from Oberlin College.

== Publications ==
- Opportunities for Wartime Training for Women in New York City (1918)
- "Rhoda McCulloch, '10" (1920)
- Women in the Law (1920)
- Women in Chemistry (1922)
- Training for the Professions and Allied Occupations: Facilities Available to Women in the United States (1924, with Emma P. Hirth)

== Personal life and legacy ==
Doerschuk died in 1974, at the age of 94, at a nursing home in New Wilmington, Pennsylvania. There is a reading room named for Doerschuk in a campus library at Sarah Lawrence College.
