= Nut Tree =

Mixed-use development in Vacaville, California

Coordinates: 38.36994°N 121.96135°W

Nut Tree is a lifestyle center in Vacaville, California near the intersection of Interstate 80 and Interstate 505.

== The original Nut Tree ==
=== History ===
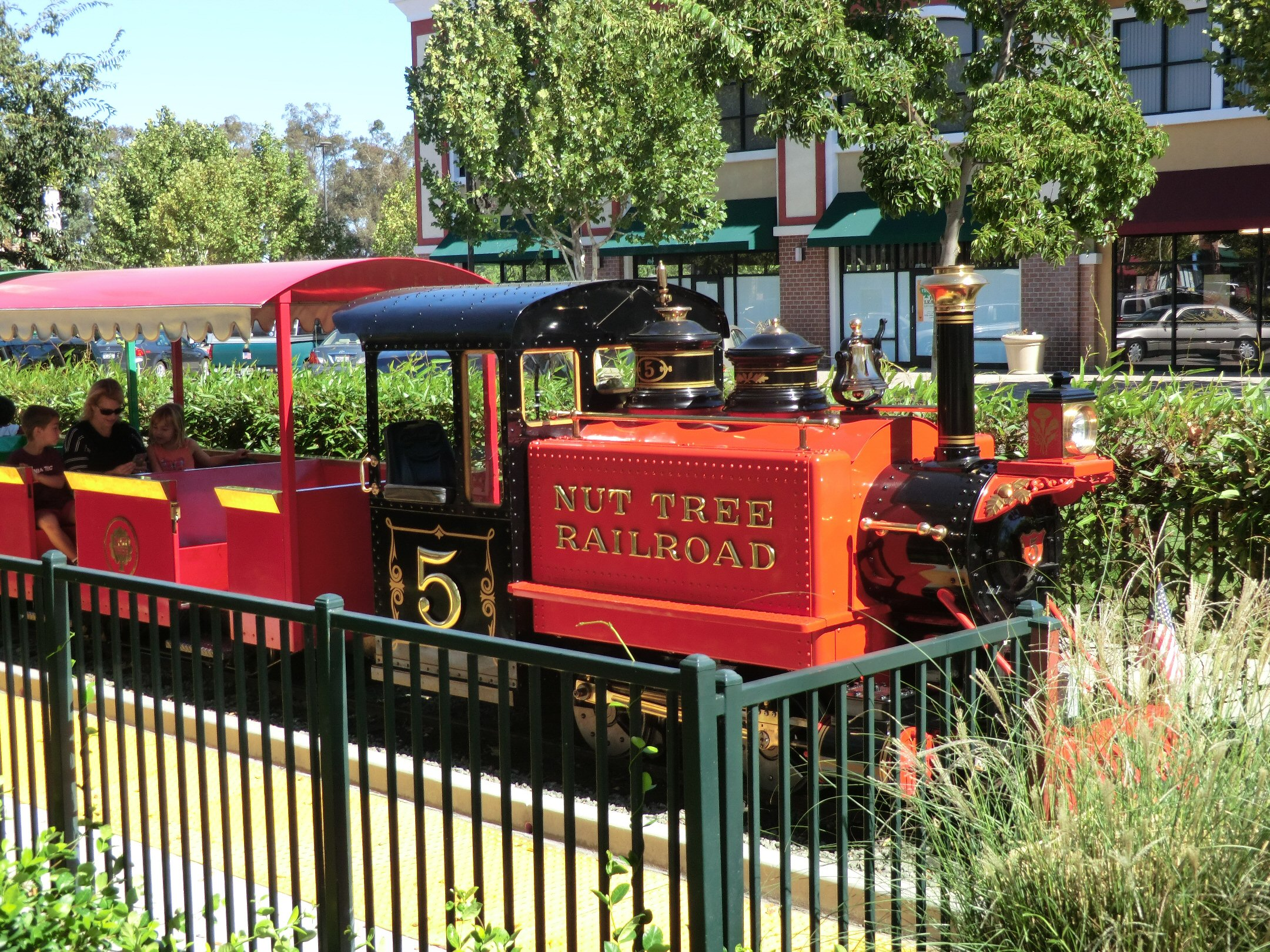
Nut Tree train

The original Nut Tree opened on July 3, 1921 on the Lincoln Highway (old U.S. Route 40). It was created by Helen and Ed "Bunny" Power as a small roadside fruit stand, and built near the site of Helen's childhood home ('Harbison House' dating from 1907), which she and her husband purchased from her parents not long after their 1920 marriage. The black walnut tree after which the Nut Tree was named grew from a black walnut that pioneer Sallie Fox had picked up along a trail in Arizona before arriving in Vacaville in 1859.

By its second year, it was serving an average of 950 cars per day.

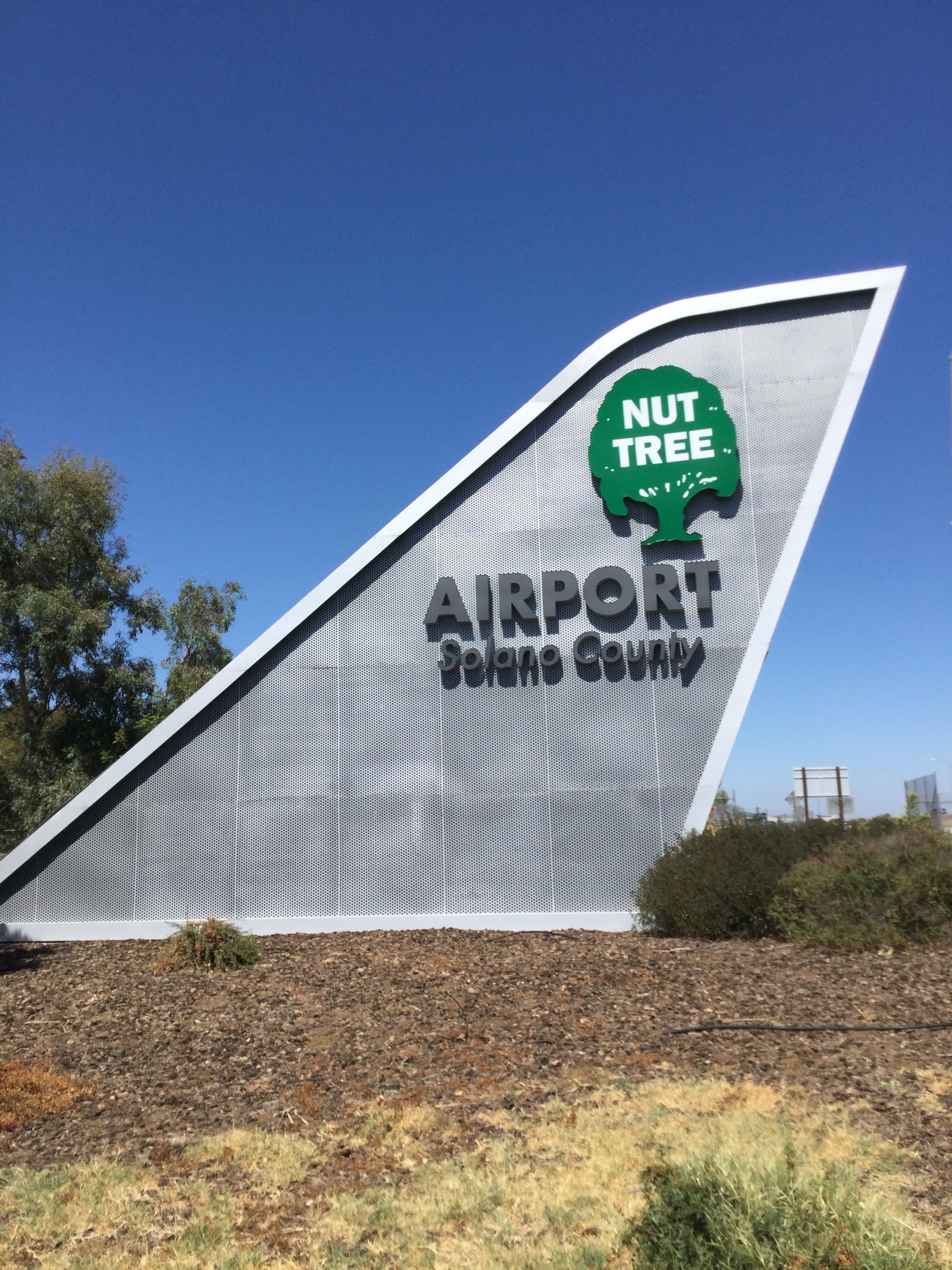
Nut Tree Airport sign in Vacaville

The Nut Tree grew as US 40 became Interstate 80. At its peak, it contained a restaurant, an outdoor eatery, a bakery, a gift shop, a toy shop, the Nut Tree Railroad that gave rides from the toy shop to the airport, and the Nut Tree Airport, which is now owned and operated by Solano County. It was a welcome rest stop on the road between Sacramento and the San Francisco Bay Area. Throughout the year, kids enjoyed giant frosted honey cookies (personalized on request), the numerous "Hobby Horses" rocking horses and riding the train.

It welcomed several celebrities, including Ronald Reagan when he became California governor in 1967, Richard Nixon, Danny Kaye, Shirley Temple Black, Chuck Yeager, Peter Marino, and Bing Crosby, among others. On March 4, 1983, Nut Tree catered a luncheon hosted by (California) Governor George Deukmejian for Queen Elizabeth II and Prince Philip at the State capitol.

Beginning in 1980, Nut Tree was home to a month-long October harvest event called 'Pumpkin Patch'. Pumpkin Patch attractions included a great scarecrow contest, a giant pumpkin display and weigh-in, and pumpkin carving contests.

=== Role in California cuisine ===
The Nut Tree Restaurant was an early pioneer of California cuisine, with fresh fruits and vegetables featured in the recipes. By 1978, it was identified as "the region's most characteristic and influential restaurant." It also featured small loaves of wheat and rye bread, cooked fresh each day on the premises. A notable feature of the restaurant was its large indoor aviary, which had glass walls extending from floor to ceiling. Nut Tree knives and cutting boards, as well as books on aviation, were sold in the gift shop. A recipe book called Nut Tree Remembered - The Cookbook was printed by the Vacaville Museum in 1997. It contains 40 recipes, and more than 100 photos and graphics from the restaurant and retail stores that closed in 1996. As of September, 2015, they still accept phone orders for the remaining copies.

=== Design ===
Don Birrell served as the design director for the Nut Tree from 1953 until his retirement in 1990. Ed Power hired Charles Eames to design the Nut Tree's furniture. A 1957 trip to Denmark gave Ed Power and Don Birell the idea of designing the Nut Tree's patio area to resemble the Tivoli Gardens with special lighting and kiosks.

=== Coffee Tree ===
The Coffee Tree was a coffee shop and restaurant that was a subsidiary of the Nut Tree. The Coffee Tree opened in 1965 across Interstate 80 from the Nut Tree restaurant.

The Coffee Tree building was designed by architects Dreyfuss and Blackford in 1965. The Coffee Tree building with its distinctive curved roof line was featured in the October 1966 issue of Architectural Record and received an AIA Central Valley Merit Award in 1967. The interior of the Coffee Tree was largely designed by Don Birrell, the design director of the Nut Tree, along with the Coffee Tree's logo and menu designs. The Coffee Tree displayed artwork from artists such as Ruth Dicker, whose work was sometimes featured in the Coffee Tree menus as well.

The Coffee Tree was known for several of its signature items, such as a large elongated hamburger known as the "Buddy Burger" and an "Ice Cream Clown" (a scoop of ice cream with an ice cream cone for hat and a candy clown face). The gift shop sold Nut Tree frosted gingerbread cookies featuring designs by Don Birrell. It also sold glass jars of colored sugar crystals in an assortment of colors.

When the Nut Tree restaurant closed in 1996, many employees of the Nut Tree restaurant migrated to the Coffee Tree. The Coffee Tree building was demolished in 2005.

=== Financial issues and closure ===
The Nut Tree ceased operations in 1996 due to financial issues brought about by a family feud that was taken to court. The main Nut Tree buildings were demolished in the fall of 2003. The Coffee Tree restaurant across the I-80 freeway, another part of the original Nut Tree holdings, was demolished in late 2005. The old original Harbison house was donated to the Vacaville Museum in 1998 and is being restored in a new location 1000 feet from the original site.

== Redevelopment and reopening ==
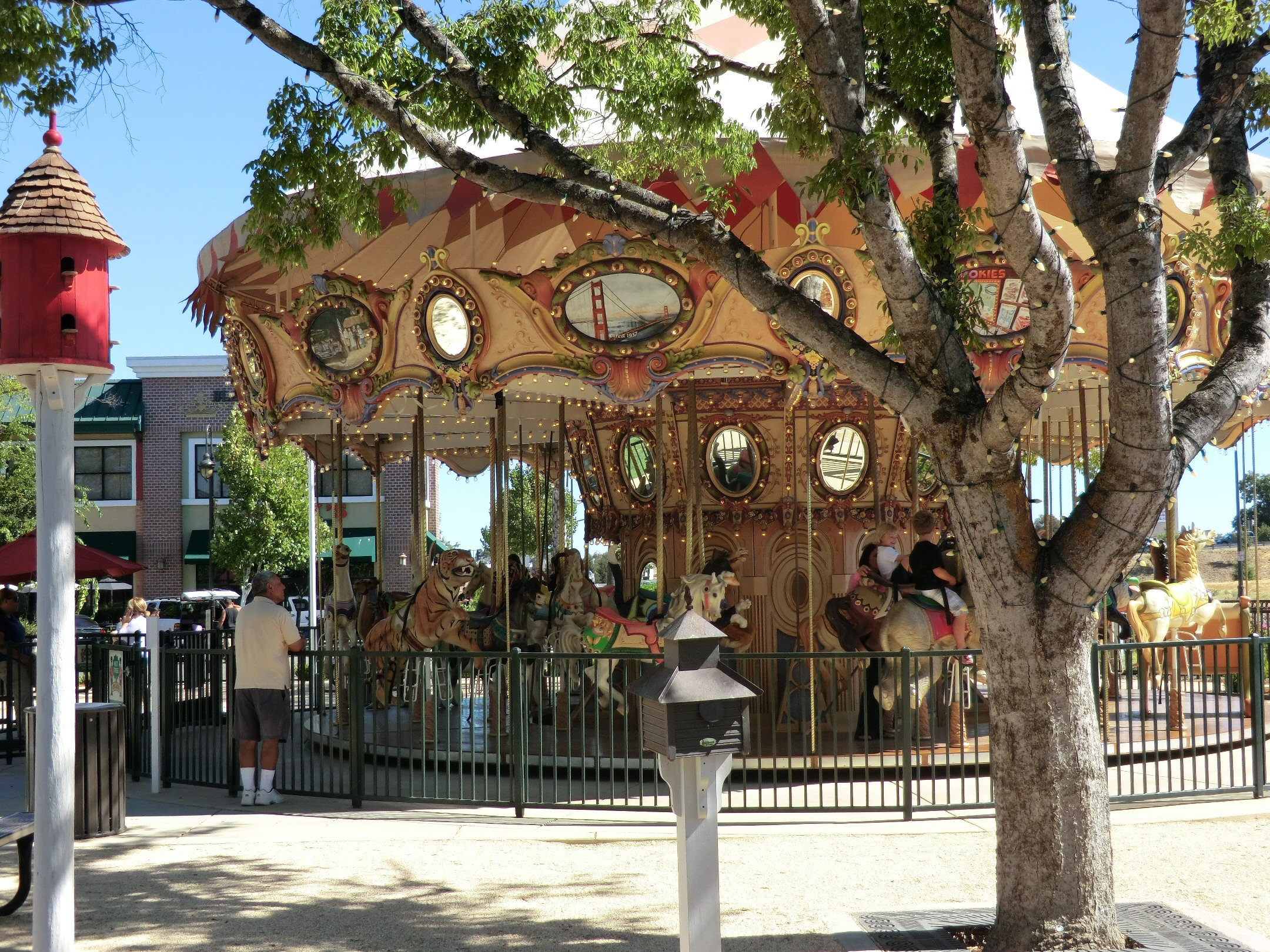
Nut Tree carousel

In 2002, Snell & Company began the redevelopment project. In 2004, the Vacaville City Council approved the Nut Tree Master Plan with retail, restaurants, offices, housing and an amusement park. In 2006, Nut Tree Plaza opened. In 2009, Snell sold to Westrust, later called Capretta Properties. In April 2022, Nut Tree Plaza was sold to Tower Investments. As of 22 April 2022, the Nut Tree Master Plan's 216 apartment-unit land reportedly was sold to a developer, and the 176,000 square-foot business park land is for sale.

"The Nut Tree is a 71-acre $255 million Master Planned Development being developed by Nut Tree Holdings, LLC, a joint venture of Capretta Properties Inc. and Reaal Ventures Inc. At completion, the Nut Tree Master Plan will include 399,000 square feet of retail space, 140,000 square feet of office space, 216 apartment units, a 2-acre amusement park, and a 3.4-acre event center."

Nut Tree reopened in 2006 as a mixed-use development of Snell & Company. It contains Nut Tree Family Park (children's amusement park), Nut Tree Bocce Grove (bocce ball venue), Nut Tree Village (restaurants and stores) and Nut Tree Complex (retail, hotel, offices, residences). Retailers operating at opening were Best Buy, Sport Chalet and BevMo!. The restored Harbison House (which the Nut Tree had open for public tours during its final years of operation) is a major centerpiece of the development. It opened in October 2009.

Between the time that the Nut Tree closed and its building was demolished, the Northern California Renaissance Fair was held on its grounds for several years running.

The Nut Tree Family Park closed on January 14, 2009, due to the lack of attendance.

On August 22, 2009, the grand opening celebration was held for the reopening of the Nut Tree, under the new ownership of Westrust. The new Nut Tree adopted some of the original attractions, such as the Nut Tree Railroad and other historical elements of the original Nut Tree, along with new elements such as a carousel.
