= Harbison House (Vacaville, California) =

Historic house

Coordinates: 38°22′13″N 121°57′46″W

The Harbison House is an historically significant house on Monte Vista Avenue in Vacaville, California. The Harbison House was originally located on the Harbison Ranch, where the Nut Tree restaurant and roadside stop were located.

== History ==
The Harbison House was designed by Hester Harbison and built by prominent local builder George Sharpe, who also built many of the homes on Buck Avenue in Vacaville, along with the original Vacaville High School building. The Harbison House was built in 1906 at a cost of about $6,000. Eventually the Harbison House was given to Helen Harbison Power and her husband Ed Power Sr., the founders of the Nut Tree.

The Harbison House remained on the grounds of the Nut Tree until the original Nut Tree was closed in 1996, when responsibility for the house was given to the Vacaville Museum.

The Harbison House is currently located at the Nut Tree Harbison Event Center on property that the city's former redevelopment agency used to own. The house was moved 1,000 feet back from its original location as part of the redevelopment of the Nut Tree property.
