= Esther Mohr Raushenbush =

American college administrator

- Born: Esther Mohr; November 22, 1898
- Died: July 21, 1980 (aged 81); Quebec, Canada
- Other name: Esther McGill
- Occupation: College administrator

Esther Mohr Raushenbush (November 22, 1898 – July 21, 1980) was an American educator and college administrator. She was president of Sarah Lawrence College from 1965 to 1969.

== Early life and education ==
Mohr was born in Seattle, the daughter of Morris (or Maurice) Mohr and Annie Saransky Mohr. Her parents were Jewish; her mother was born near Kyiv, and her father near Vienna. She graduated from the University of Washington in 1921, and earned a master's degree there in 1922. Her younger sister Jennie Mohr was a social work professor at Simmons College.

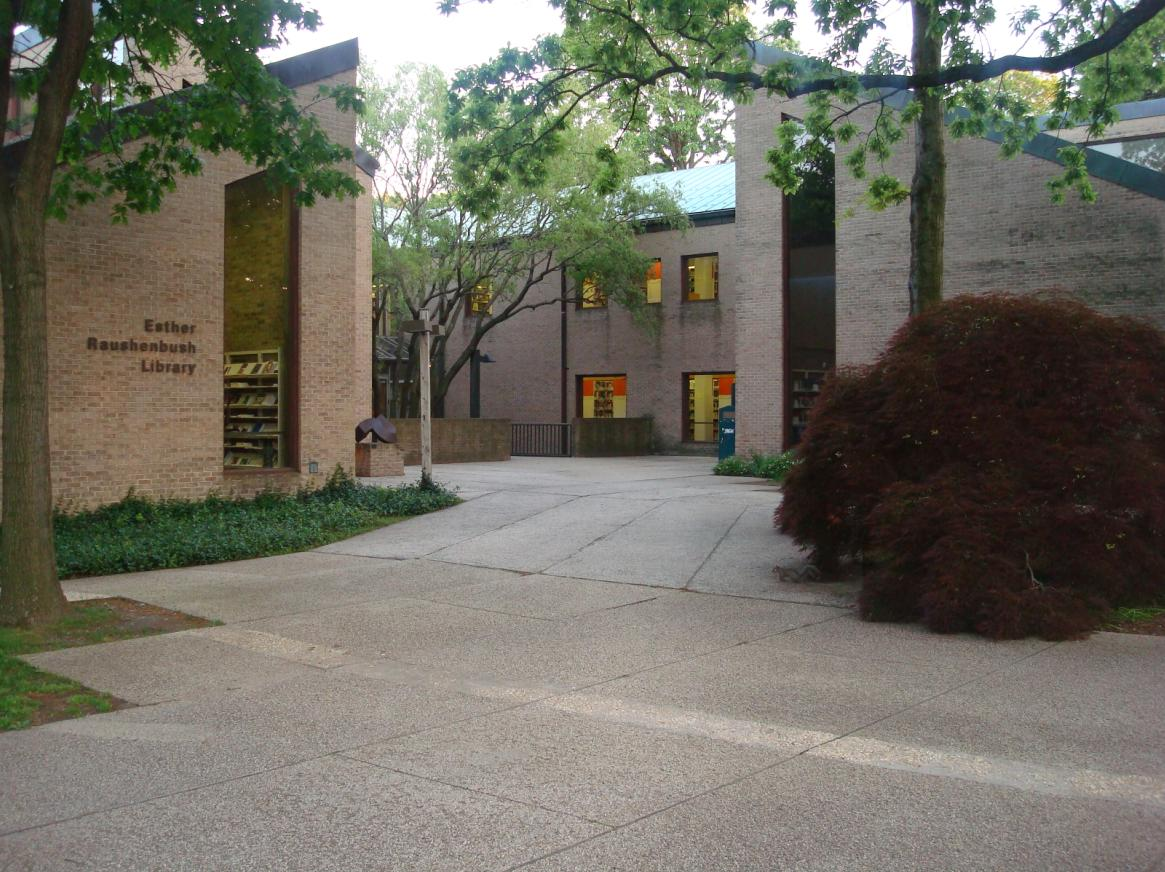
The Esther Raushenbush Library at Sarah Lawrence College

== Career ==
Raushenbush taught English at the University of Washington, Wellesley College, Barnard College, and Columbia University. She joined the faculty of Sarah Lawrence College in 1935, as an English literature professor. In 1946 she succeeded Anna Doerschuk as the college's dean, a position she held until 1957. She was also director of the college's summer seminar program. In 1962 she founded the college's Center for Continuing Education. She was president of the college from 1965 to 1969. Her English department colleague Muriel Rukeyser read Shakespeare sonnets at Raushenbush's inauguration. The college's library was named for her in 1979.

From 1970 to 1979, she worked as a consultant with the John Hay Whitney Foundation.

== Publications ==
- "Charles Macklin's Lost Play about Henry Fielding" (1936)
- Literature for Individual Education (1942)
- "General Education for Students" (1952, with Malcolm S. MacLean)
- "Unfinished Business: Continuing Education for Women" (1961)
- The Fulbright professor meets the American college (1962, report)
- The Student and His Studies (1964)
- "A Humanist's View" (1965)
- "A Larger Role for the Small College" (1968)

== Personal life ==
Mohr married philosophy professor and editor Vivian Jerauld McGill in Boston in 1923; they separated in 1928, and divorced in 1932. She married her second husband, labor economist Carl Raushenbush, in 1935; they had a son. She died in 1980, at the age of 82, while vacationing in Quebec. There is a collection of her papers in the Sarah Lawrence College archives.
