= Jonathan Thollander =

Swedish ice hockey player

- Born: July 2, 1992 (age 33)
- Height: 5 ft 7 in (170 cm)
- Weight: 176 lb (80 kg; 12 st 8 lb)
- Position: Right wing
- Shoots: Left
- Elitserien team: HV71
- NHL draft: Undrafted
- Playing career: 2011–present

Jonathan Thollander (born July 2, 1992) is a Swedish professional ice hockey player who currently plays for HV71 in the Swedish Elitserien.
