= Nut Tree Airport =

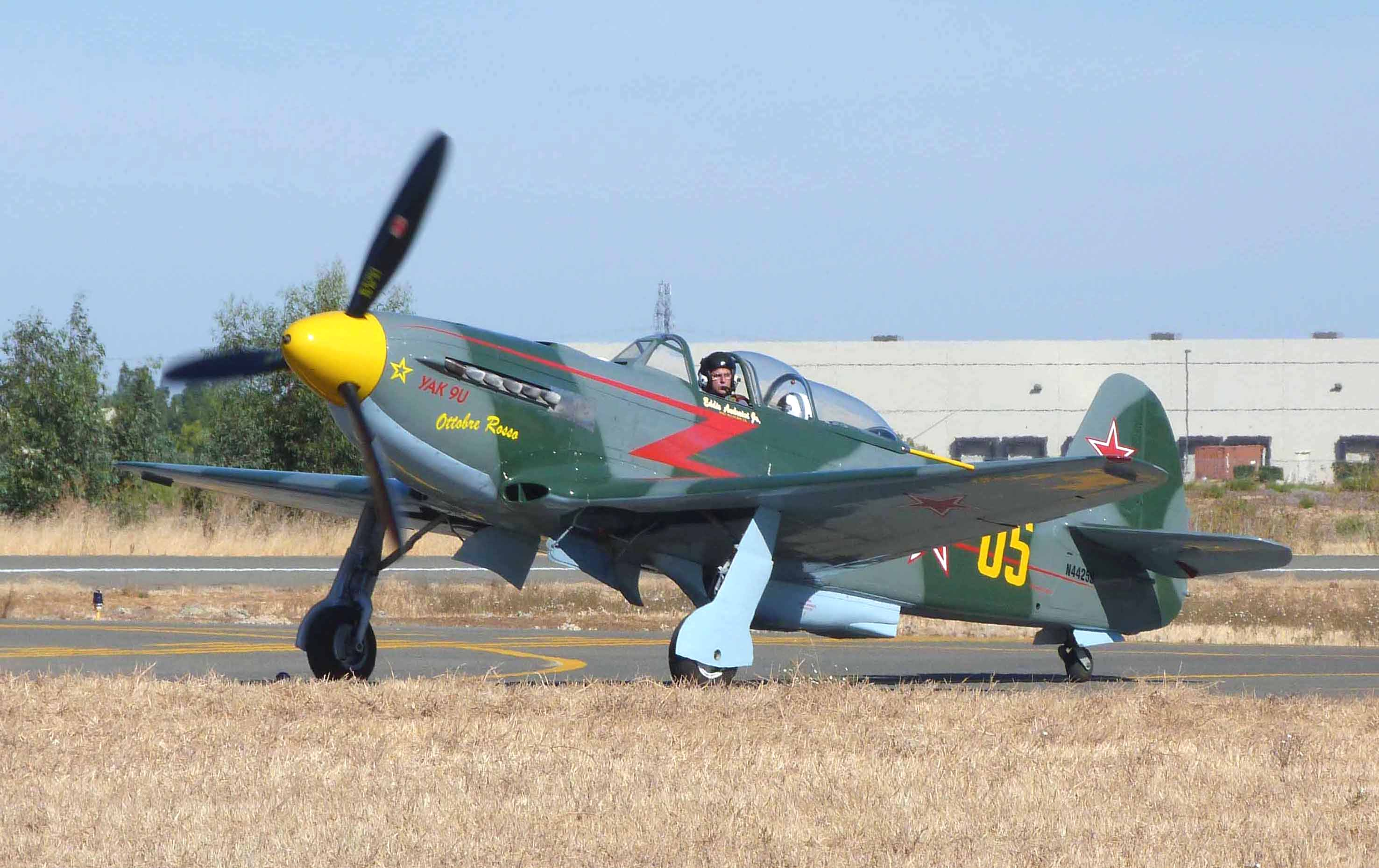
- Yak-9U at Nut Tree Airport
- IATA: none; ICAO: KVCB; FAA LID: VCB

Summary
- Airport type: Public
- Owner/Operator: County of Solano
- Serves: Vacaville, California
- Elevation AMSL: 117 ft / 36 m
- Coordinates: 38°22′40″N 121°57′42″W
- Website: http://www.flynuttree.com/nta/Home.html
- Interactive map of Nut Tree Airport

Runways
Direction	Length		Surface
Direction	ft	m	Surface
2/20	4,700	1,433	Asphalt

Statistics (2022)
- Aircraft operations (year ending 3/21/2022): 87,000
- Based aircraft: 214
- Source: Federal Aviation Administration

Nut Tree Airport (ICAO: KVCB, FAA LID: VCB, formerly O45) is a county-owned public-use airport located two nautical miles (3.7 km) northeast of the central business district of Vacaville, in Solano County, California, United States.

The airport is near the junction of Interstates 80 and 505. It is adjacent to the Nut Tree retail/commercial development, which replaced a historic US 40 highway stop from which both derive their name.

== History ==
The Nut Tree Airport was founded in 1955 by Ed Power Jr., an aviation enthusiast and the son of Nut Tree founders Ed "Bunny" Power Sr. and Helen Harbison Power, as a way of attracting aviators to the Nut Tree. The family sold the airport to Solano County in the 1970s.

== Facilities and aircraft ==
Nut Tree Airport covers an area of 262 acres (106 ha) at an elevation of 117 feet (36 m) above mean sea level. It has one runway designated 2/20 with an asphalt surface measuring 4,700 by 75 feet (1,433 x 23 m).

For the 12-month period ending March 21, 2022, the airport had 87,000 aircraft operations, an average of 238 per day: 97% general aviation and 2% air taxi. At that time there were 214 aircraft based at this airport: 189 single-engine, 19 multi-engine and 6 helicopters.

== Gallery ==
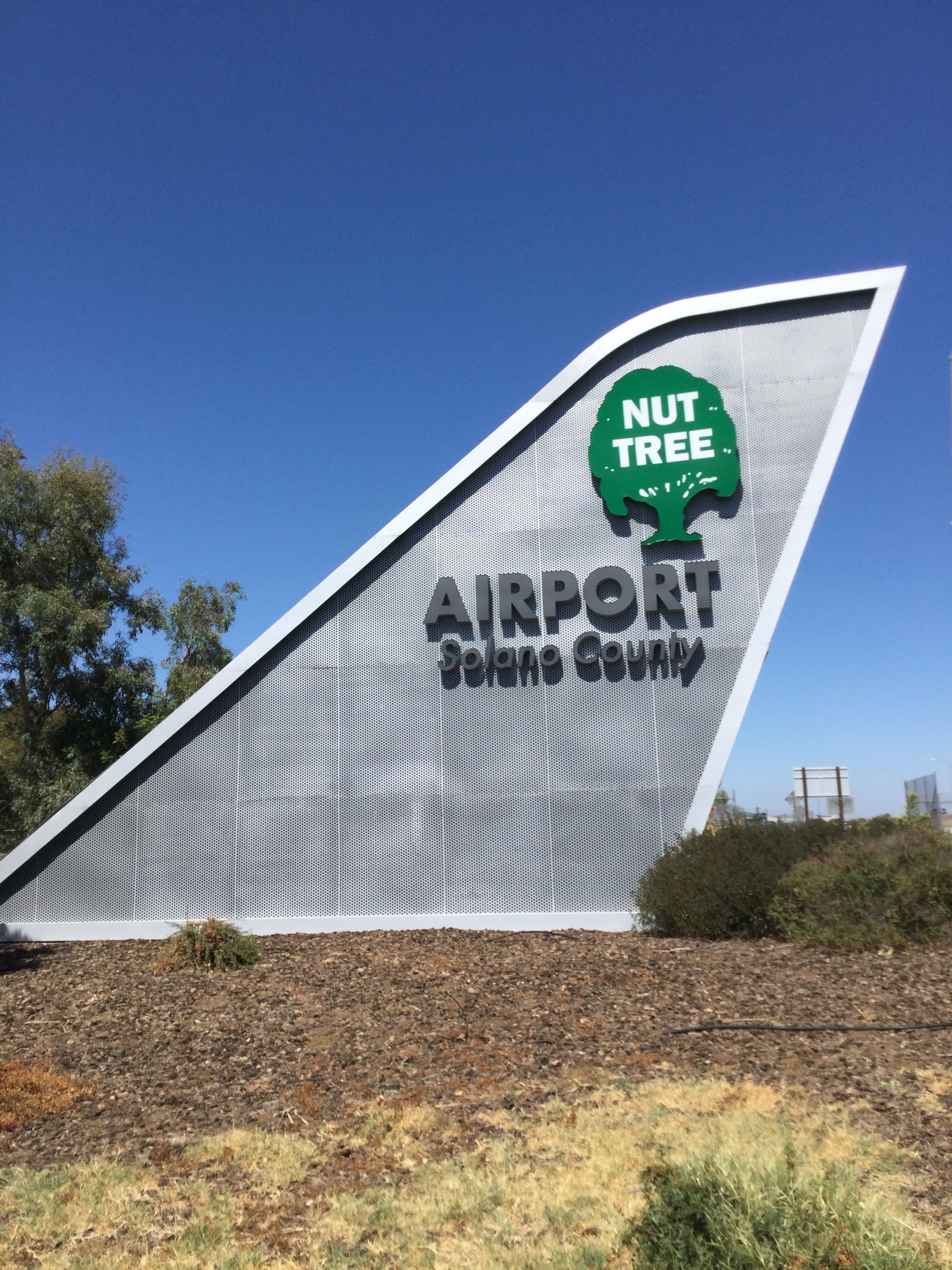
Nut Tree Airport sign in Vacaville

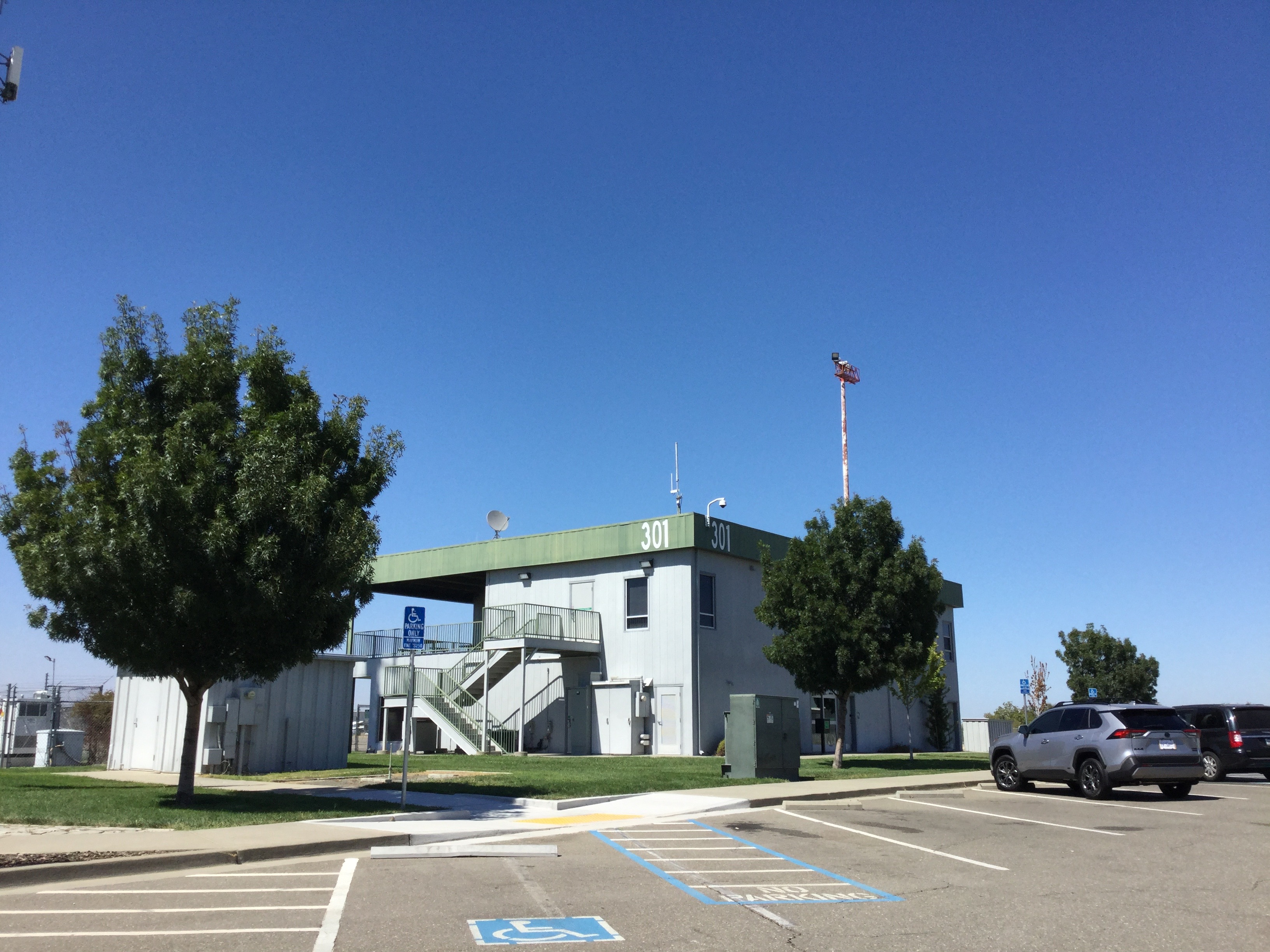
Nut Tree Airport

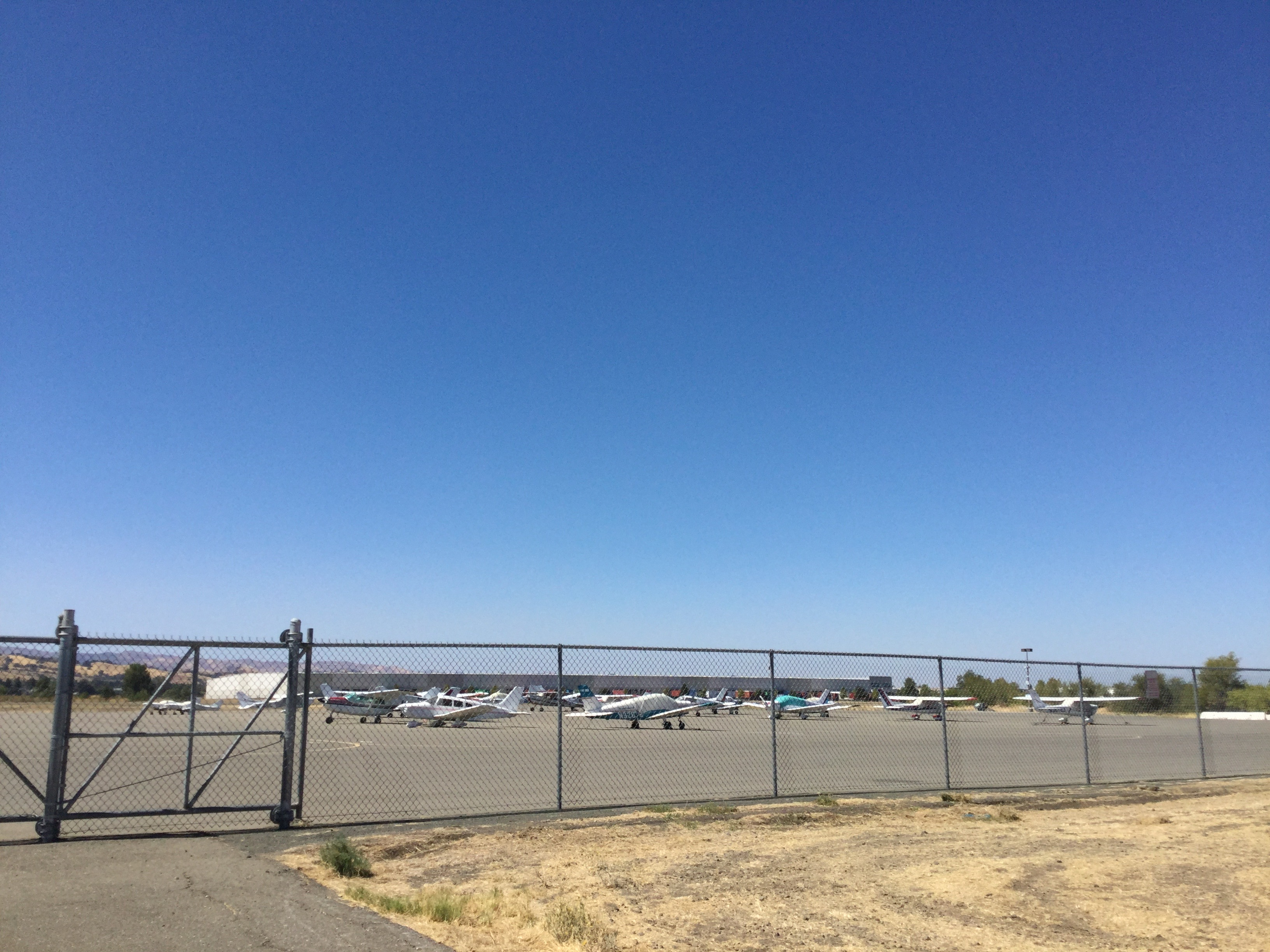
Planes at the Nut Tree Airport

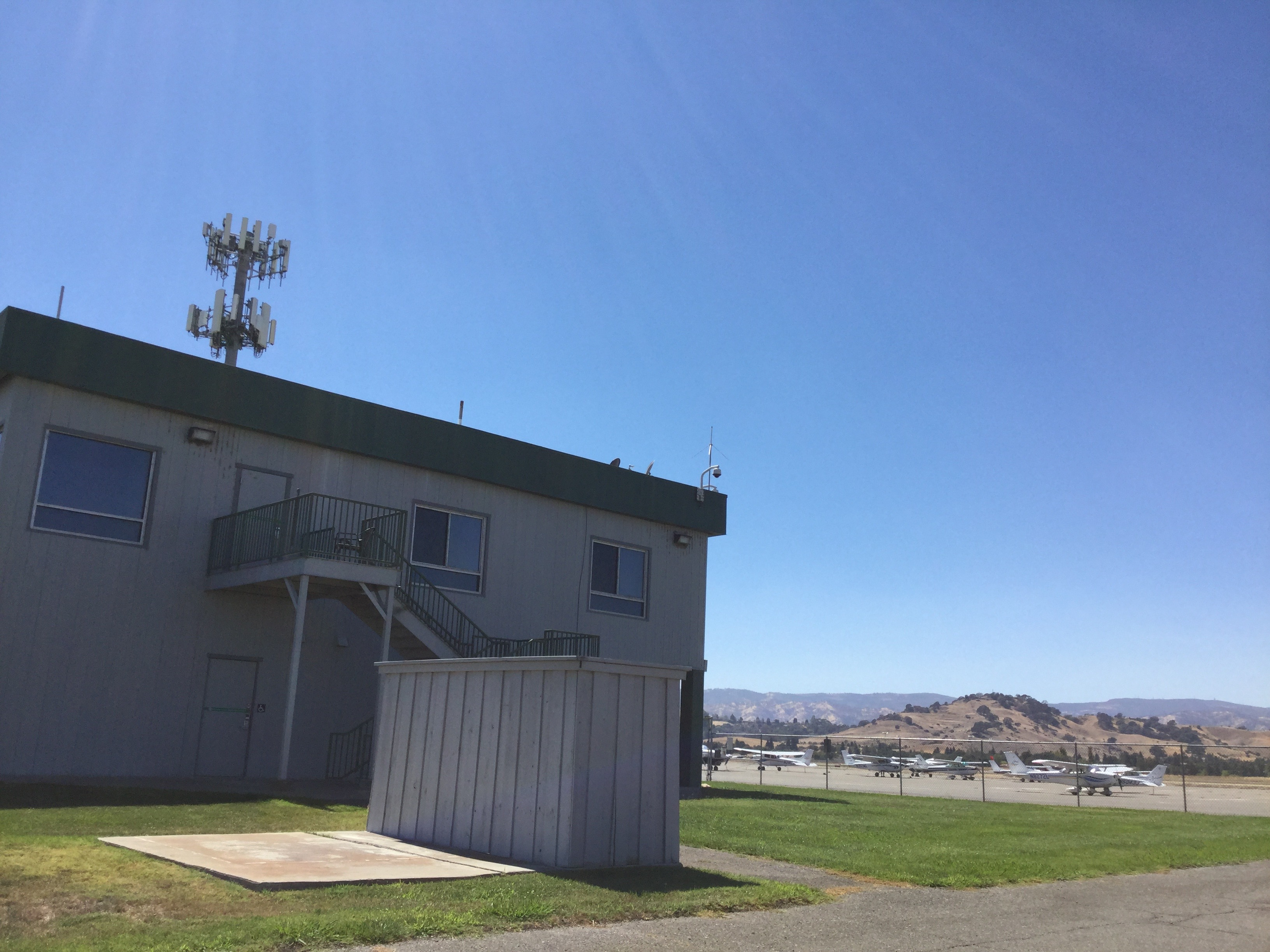
Nut Tree airport building with planes in background

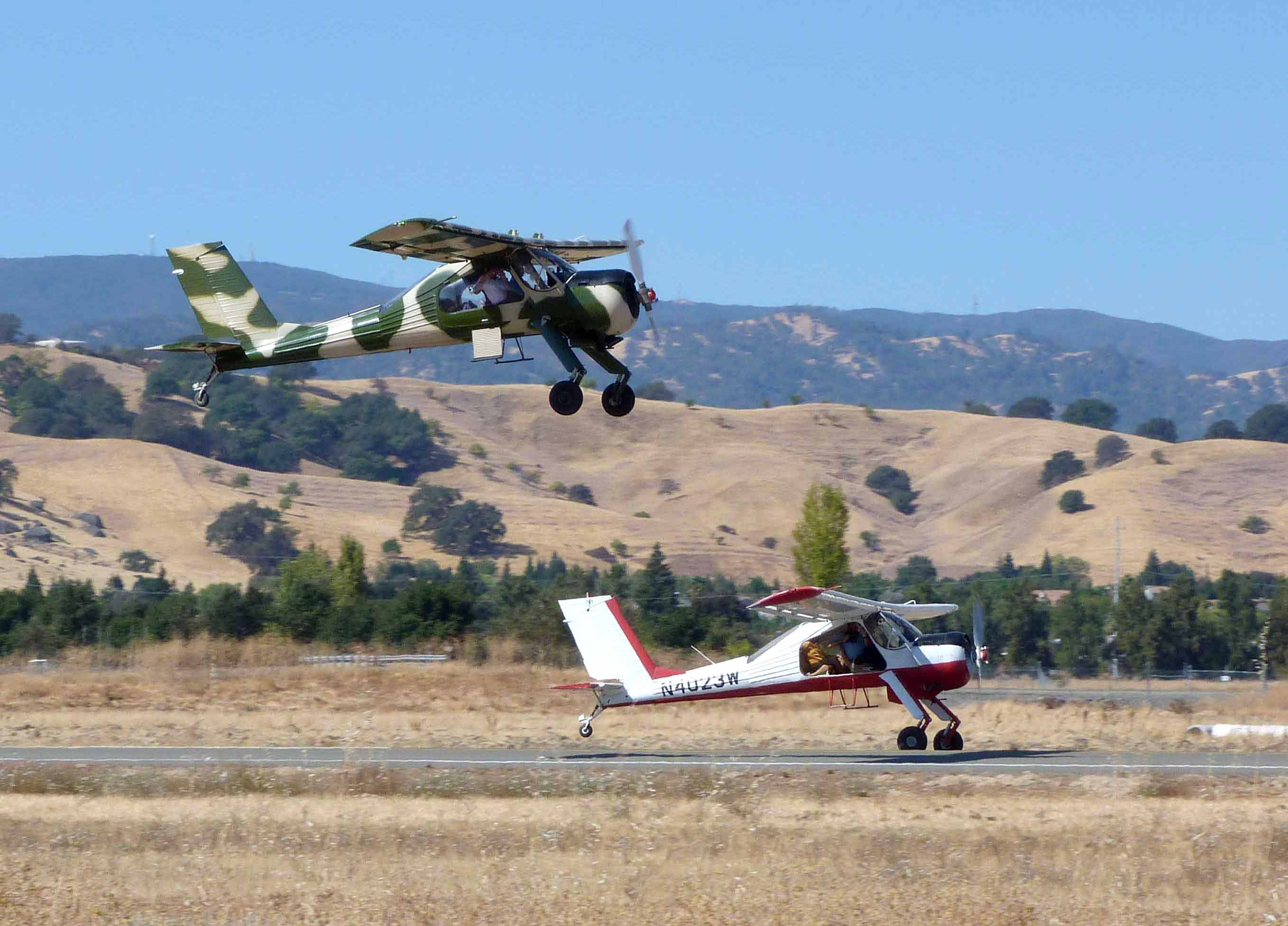
Wilgas Formation taking off at Nut Tree

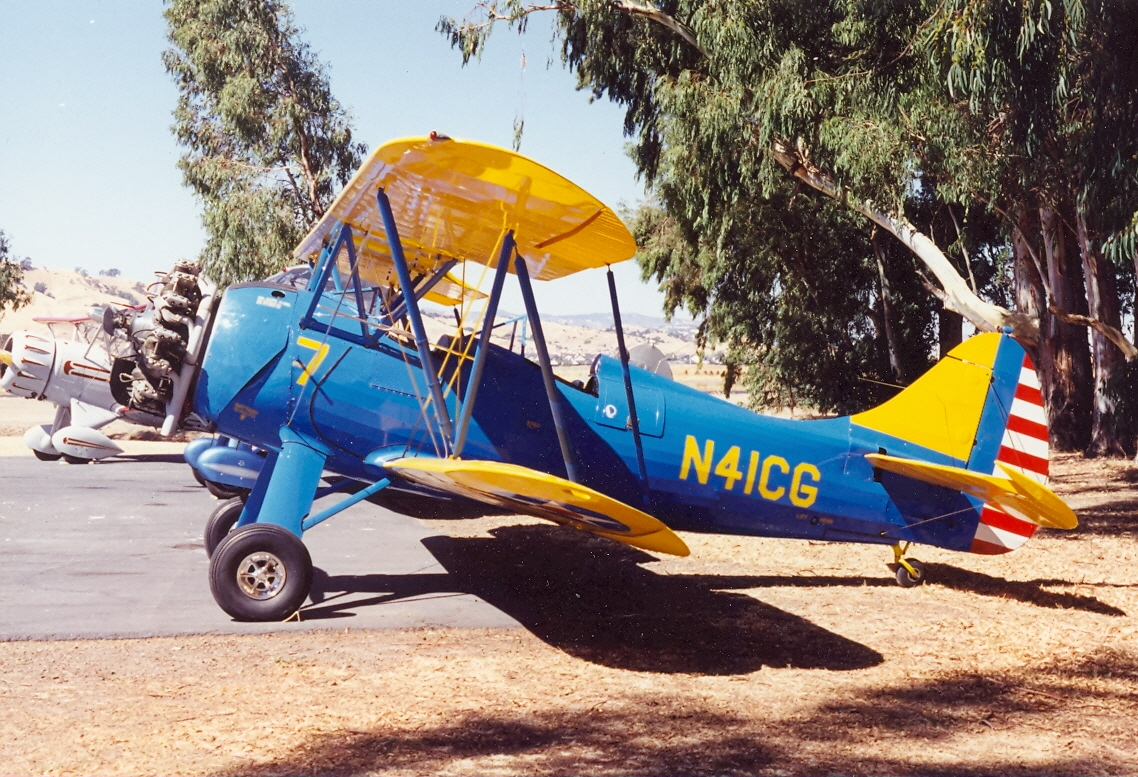
Waco UPF-7 at Nut Tree

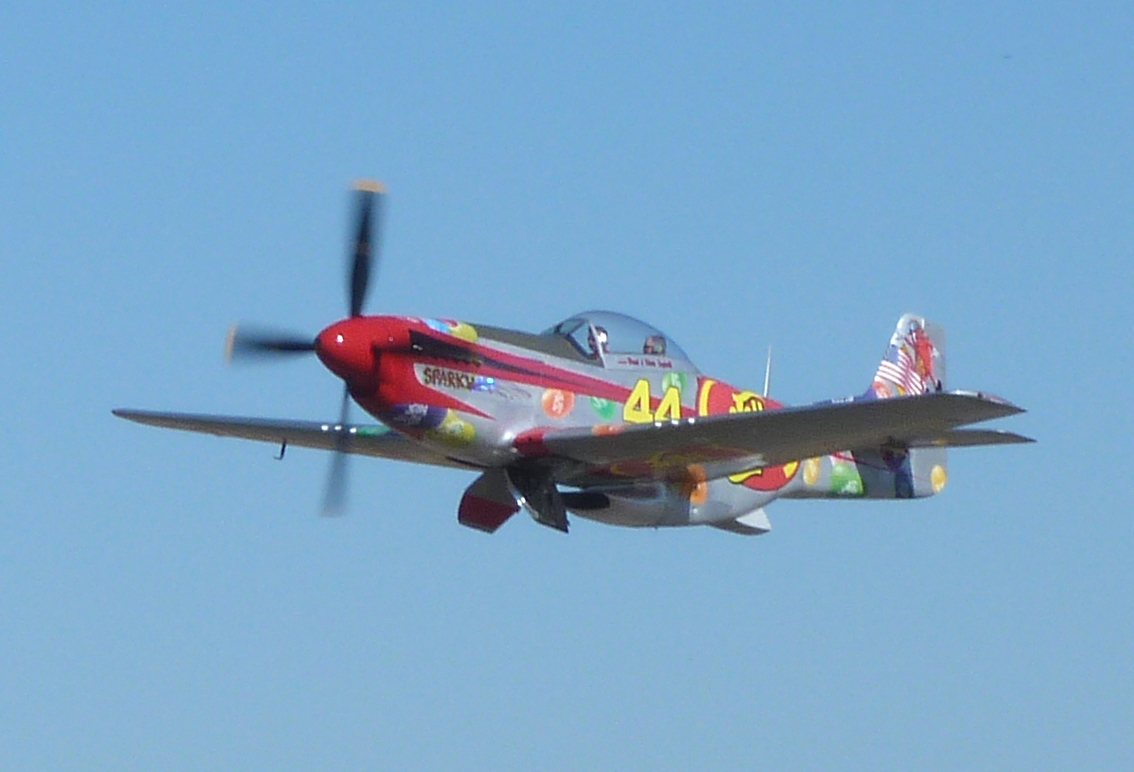
P-51D N151D taking off at Nut Tree
