= The Reporter (Vacaville) =

Newspaper in Vacaville, California

- Type: Daily newspaper
- Format: Broadsheet
- Owner: Digital First Media
- Founder: James D. McClain
- Publisher: Steve Bressoud
- Editor: Jack F.K. Bungart
- Founded: 1883
- Language: English
- Headquarters: 401 Davis Street, Suite F, Vacaville, California
- Circulation: 2,721 Daily; 3,824 Sunday (as of 2022)
- ISSN: 0746-4193
- OCLC number: 10029579
- Website: thereporter.com

The Vacaville Reporter is a newspaper in the city of Vacaville, California. It also covers surrounding Solano County, California, including Fairfield and Dixon.

== History ==
The first issue of The Reporter was published on March 10, 1883 by editor and proprietor James D. McClain. A year later the paper was bought by attorney Raleigh Barcar. On March 4, 1885, Barcar changed the paper's name to Judicion. The word "Judicion" was invented by Barcar. He wrote it was a word of "merit" and intended it to be "a refinement of Gumption," which he thought inelegant.

On Feb. 4, 1886, McClain started another rival paper in Vacaville called The Reporter. A.B. Leach of Judicion sued McClain for $2,500 to stop him from using that name. On Jan. 19, 1889, Henry I. Fisher and Albert Sears started the Vaca Valley Enterprise, which Barcar bought in 1891 and consolidated with Judicion. In 1892, Barcar bought McClain's paper and renamed Judicion back to The Reporter. In 1901, R.B. Stitt launched the Vacaville Leader and Barcar soon bought this paper as well.

In April 1902, Clayton L. Adsit became a co-owner with Raleigh Barcar, and two years later Edward "Andy" Cleveland bought out Barcar in October 1903. Adsit worked as the paper's editor until his sudden death in March 1935. That July, plant employee John Rico purchased the interests of the deceased Adsit. Andrews retired in 1942 and sold out to Rico.

The Rico family operated the paper until selling it to MediaNews Group in 2002. At that time the paper had a circulation of 17,820 on weekdays and 19,201 on Sundays. In 2013, MediaNews Group merged and became Digital First Media which is controlled by Alden Global Capital.
