= Earl Thollander =

American artist, illustrator, author and WWII U.S. Navy officer

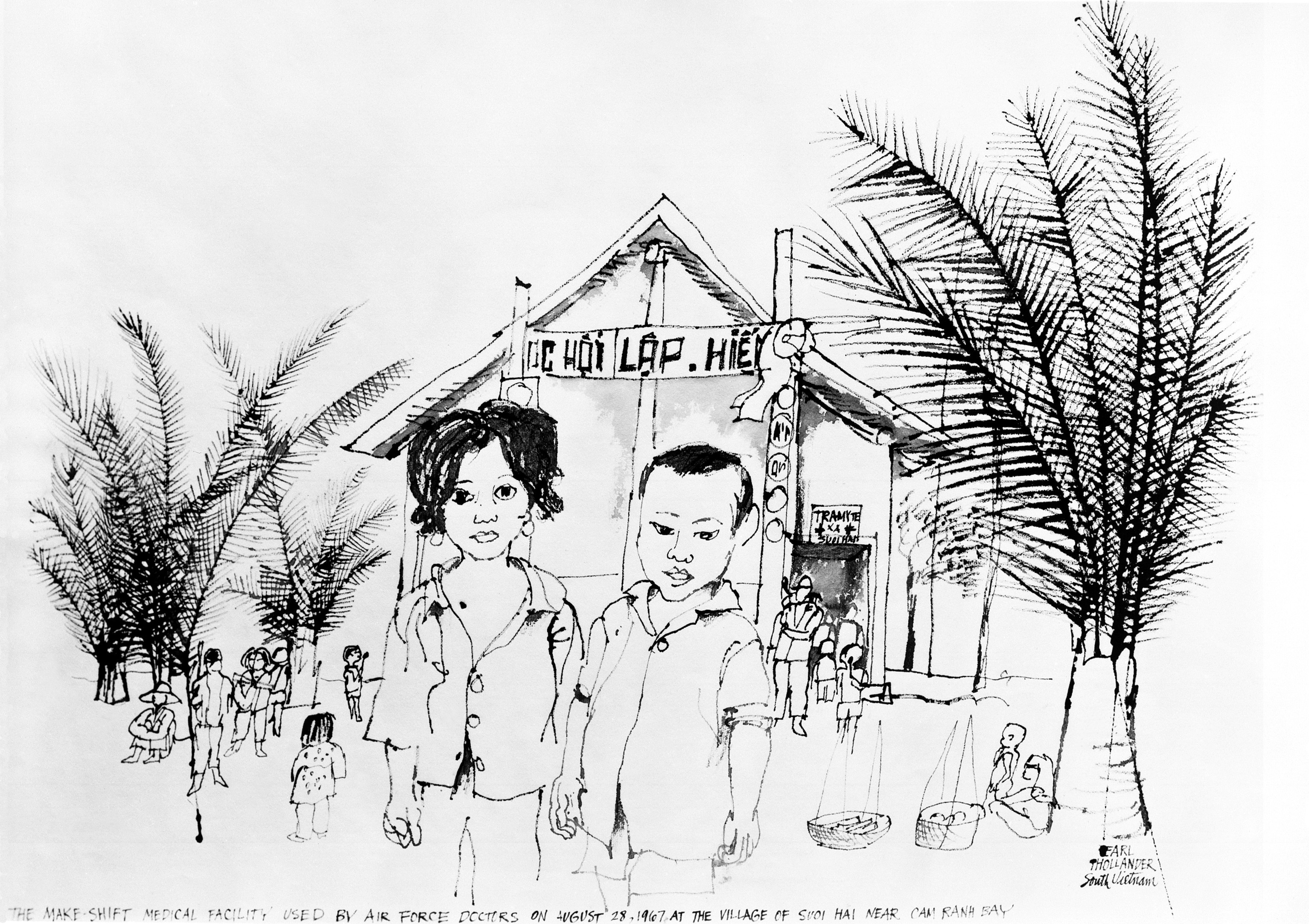
- "Children of South Vietnam" artwork by Earl Thollander (1982)
- Born: April 13, 1922; Kingsburg, California, US
- Died: August 08, 2001 (aged 79)
- Occupation: Artist
- Spouse: Janet Behr (m. 1947)

Earl Thollander (April 13, 1922 – August 8, 2001) was an American artist, illustrator, author and a WWII U.S. Navy officer who is best known for his marine scene paintings, sketching, travel book writing and tour leading.

== Early life and background ==
Earl was born in Kingsburg, California in 1923. His father was a school teacher and a building contractor. He was drawn to artistic pursuits from a young age, collecting stamps and making them into books. He grew up in San Francisco and attended Mission High School, and City College. Earl earned his bachelor's degree from the University of California in 1944. He joined the U.S. Navy during the WWII, and served for two years after graduating as a Naval Officer.

== Career ==
After the war, Earl returned to his hometown and attended San Francisco Art Institute and the Academy of Art. Moving forward he married Janet Behr in 1947, and later on graduated to Landphere & Associates advertising agency as an illustrator. While employed in advertising, Earl started working as a fine artist and by 1960 he became a freelance artist working from his home studio.

Earl had a great interest in traveling and started making artworks related to different parts of the world that he had visited. He became famous for his drawings such as of Mount Saint Helena and scenes from Napa Valley. In his career, Earl had illustrated more than 62 children’s cooking and travel books.

== Books ==
Here are some of the illustrated books authored by Earl Thollander:

- Back Roads Of California
- Back Roads Of Oregon - 82 Trips On Oregon's Scenic Byways
- Back Roads of California: 65 Trips on California s Scenic Byways
- Back Roads Of New England
- Back Roads Of Washington
- Back Roads Of Arizona
- Back Roads Of Texas
- Earl Thollander's Back Roads Of California
- Earl Thollander's San Francisco
- Back Roads Of The Carolinas
- Barns Of California
- Arizona's Scenic Byways
- The thousand recipe: Chinese cookbook
- On The Shore Of The Sundown Sea
