= Vacaville Museum =

History museum in Vacaville, California

- Location: 213 Buck Avenue, Vacaville, CA 95688
- Coordinates: 38.3563001°N 121.99374060000002°W
- Public transit access: Vacaville City Coach
- Website: www.vacavillemuseum.org

The Vacaville Museum is a local history museum located on Buck Avenue in Vacaville, California.

== History ==
Construction of the Vacaville Museum began in 1981 after Eva Buck, the wife of Frank H. Buck, donated money and land for the museum. It opened in 1984 and celebrated its 25th anniversary in 2009. In 2015, public art project We Know Jack raised US$90,000 for the museum by auctioning 24 fibreglass rabbits.
