= Querino Canyon Bridge =

- U.S. National Register of Historic Places
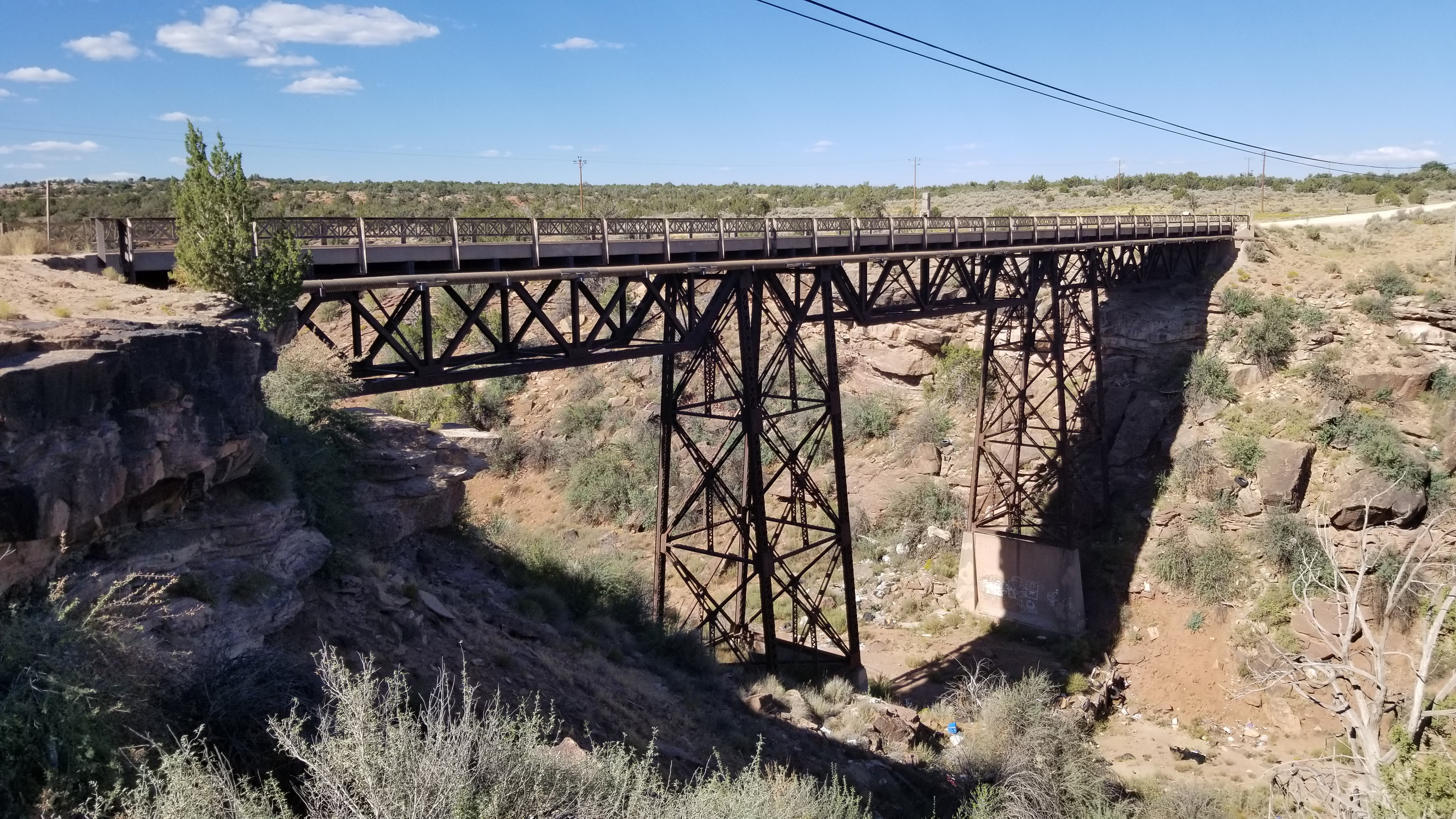
- Querino Canyon Bridge, September 2020

- Location within Arizona Location within the United States
- Location: southwest of Houck, Arizona
- Nearest city: Houck, Arizona
- Coordinates: 35°16′15.5″N 109°16′37.8″W
- Area: 0.1 acres (0.040 ha)
- Built: 1930
- Built by: F.D. Shufflebarger
- Architect: Arizona Highway Department
- Architectural style: Warren deck truss
- MPS: Vehicular Bridges in Arizona MPS
- NRHP reference No.: 88001623
- Added to NRHP: September 30, 1988

The Querino Canyon Bridge is located in Apache County, Arizona, United States, approximately four miles (6.4 km) southwest of Houck on Old Route 66, over Querino Canyon.

== Description ==
The structure is a Warren deck truss bridge developed in 1929 by the Arizona Highway Department (AHD) as part of renovating and re-routing what was then U.S. Route 66 between Sanders and Lupton in Apache County.

The contractor was F.D. Shufflebarger; the material was produced by Inland Steel Company.

== See also ==
- National Register of Historic Places listings in Apache County, Arizona
