= U.S. Route 66 in Arizona =

Former designated US Numbered Highway section

U.S. Route 66
- Will Rogers Highway
- 1940 alignment of US 66 highlighted in red

Route information
- Maintained by ASHD
- Length: 385.20 mi (619.92 km) Mileage reflects US 66 as it was in 1940.
- Existed: November 11, 1926–June 26, 1985
- History: Western end at I-40 in Kingman during final years
- Tourist routes: Historic Route 66

Major junctions
- West end: US 66 at California state line
- US 93 / US 466 in Kingman; US 89 from Ash Fork to Flagstaff; US 260 in Holbrook; US 666 in Sanders
- East end: US 66 / US 666 at New Mexico state line

Location
- Country: United States
- State: Arizona
- Counties: Mohave, Coconino, Yavapai, Navajo, Apache

Highway system
- United States Numbered Highway System; List; Special; Divided; Arizona State Highway System; Interstate; US; State; Scenic Proposed; Former
← SR 65	→ SR 66

U.S. Route 66 (US 66, Route 66) also known as the Will Rogers Highway, was a major United States Numbered Highway in the state of Arizona from November 11, 1926, to June 26, 1985. US 66 covered a total of 385.20 miles (619.92 km) through Arizona. The highway ran from west to east, starting in Needles, California, through Kingman and Seligman to the New Mexico state line. Nationally, US 66 ran from Santa Monica, California, to Chicago, Illinois. In its height of popularity, US 66 was one of the most popular highways in the state of Arizona, sometimes carrying over one million cars a year.

In the early years, US 66 had to compete with other major U.S. Highways for construction and improvement funding. The highway also played an important role during the Dust Bowl as a means for refugees (also known as "Okies") to escape the ruined farmlands of the Great Plains and migrate to California. The experiences of these refugees traveling through Arizona were largely detailed in John Steinbeck's novel, The Grapes of Wrath, and the 1940 movie adaption that followed. During the mid-20th century, the highway became a tourist destination, spawning the existence of several new motels, restaurants and other road-side businesses and attractions.

With the introduction of Interstate 40 (I-40), US 66 began declining considerably, with some of the towns along the highway becoming ghost towns. Following the completion of I-40, US 66 was completely decommissioned by the Arizona Department of Transportation (ADOT) in 1984, then retired nationwide the following year. Significant portions of the old highway remain, such as State Route 66 (SR 66) between Kingman and the Yavapai–Coconino county line east of Peach Springs. Since 1987, other sections have been designated as Historic Route 66, which is both an Arizona Historic Road and a National Scenic Byway.

== Route description ==
US 66 was one of the main transnational highways in Arizona, serving as the main east–west highway through the northern end of the state. Nationally, US 66 ran from Chicago, Illinois, to the Los Angeles, California, metropolitan area. The highway in Arizona was over 380 miles (610 km) in its earlier years, between California and New Mexico. The route originally went from Topock through Oatman to Kingman. Later, the route between Topock and Kingman was switched to an alignment going through Yucca.

From Kingman, US 66 went northeast to Peach Springs before heading southeast to Seligman. Between Seligman and the New Mexico state line near Lupton, US 66 traveled the same basic route I-40 takes today, through Flagstaff, Winslow and Holbrook. Save for several city streets east of Flagstaff, most of US 66 has either been cut off, abandoned, destroyed or rebuilt into sections of I-40. Notable exceptions include the original route through Oatman, SR 66, multiple current and former I-40 Business Loops and Townsend–Winona Road from US 89 to I-40 in Winona. Several sections of the highway no longer part of the Arizona State Highway System are listed on the National Register of Historic Places (NRHP). The following route description roughly follows the path US 66 would have traversed across Arizona in 1940.

=== California border to Kingman ===
US 66 entered Arizona from Needles, California, on the Old Trails Bridge across the Topock Gorge and Colorado River, within the Havasu National Wildlife Refuge, arriving in Topock, Arizona. The route headed northeast, where it crossed the path of present-day I-40 and the BNSF Railway (formerly the Atchison, Topeka and Santa Fe Railway). The highway then curved east for less than a mile, before curving directly north on County Route 10 (CR 10, also known as Oatman Highway), past present-day Golden Shores through Bureau of Land Management-managed federal lands.

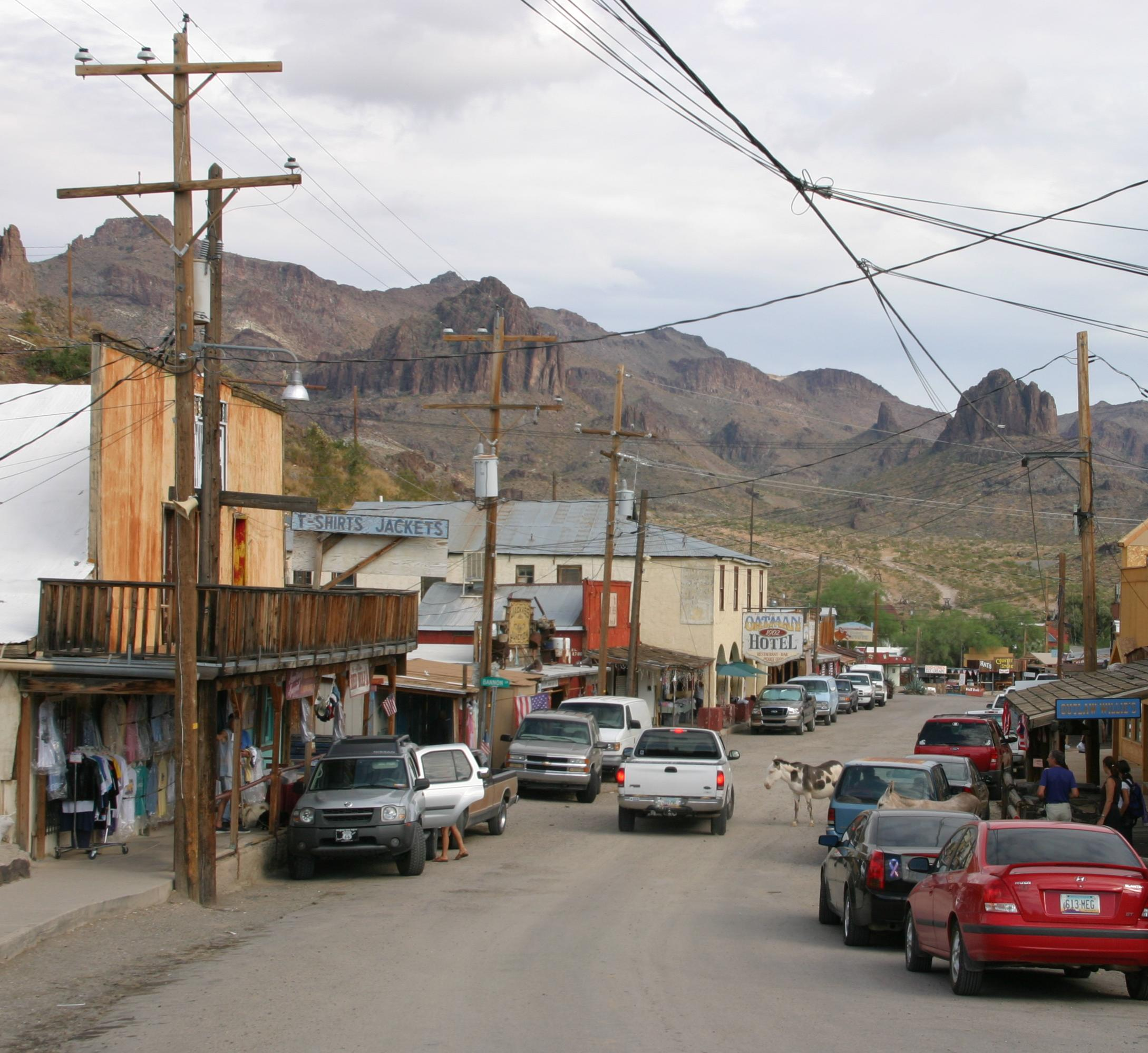
Old US 66 through downtown Oatman

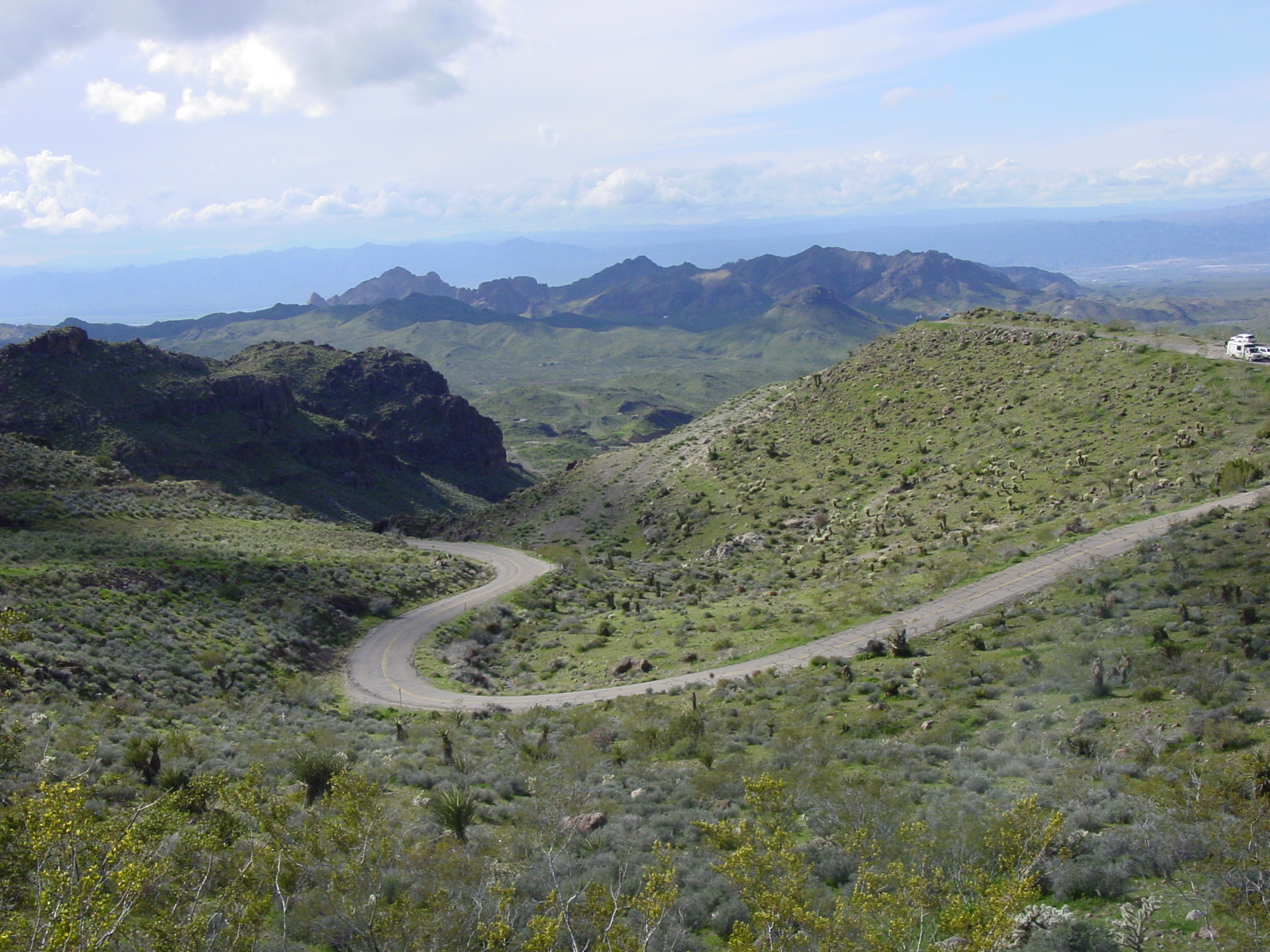
Old US 66 over Sitgreaves Pass, east of Oatman

Approximately 11.9 miles (19.2 km) north of Golden Shores, US 66 arrived at the foothills of the Black Mountains, following the base of those mountains for six miles (9.7 km) before entering them. Shortly afterward, the old highway arrived in the town of Oatman, passing through the center of the old mining town. North of Oatman, US 66 turned in a generally eastward direction winding its way up and through the Black Mountains over treacherous curves. US 66 passed through the small mining community of Goldroad and the adjacent mine, before continuing on its winding path up the mountainsides.

Less than two miles (3.2 km) east of the Goldroad Mine, US 66 crossed over Sitgreaves Pass at an elevation of 3,550 feet (1,080 m), making its slow winding descent towards the other side of the Black Mountains. The highway finally exited the mountains at Cool Springs Station, heading straight east before curving northeast again, away from the mountains. As it headed northeast, US 66 entered the town of McConnico, crossing the path of present-day I-40 again, before turning it turned north, and paralleled the Santa Fe Railway and curving through a small set of mountains. The highway and railroad then arrived in Kingman; US 66 followed Main Street (now Andy Devine Avenue). US 66 met US 93 and US 466 at a former highway junction, which is now the spot of Locomotive Park, the home of Santa Fe Railway No. 3759, a 3751 class 4-8-4 Northern steam locomotive. US 66 continued through town on Main Street, and curved northeast towards I-40 at the eastern end of Kingman. About 2.7 miles (4.3 km) northeast of Kingman, US 66 crossed under present-day I-40, and continued northeast through the present day Kingman metro area on what is now SR 66.

=== Kingman to Seligman ===
Between Kingman and Seligman, I-40's more southerly and more direct path diverges from former US 66 by approximately 16 miles (26 km), putting considerable distance between former US 66 and the current Interstate. SR 66 and Crookton Road comprise the route of old US 66 between Kingman and Seligman. The state highway designation currently covers just 66 miles (106 km) of a section east of Kingman. As US 66 headed northeast from Kingman on SR 66 and paralleled the Santa Fe Railway, the highway made a gradual northeastern curve about 20 miles (32 km) from Kingman, and entered another mountain range, where it arrived at the town of Hackberry.

From Hackberry, US 66 then curved northeast through the mountains, passing through the towns of Valentine and Crozier. Upon entering a small mountain valley, the highway passed through the town of Truxton before entering the mountains again at Peach Springs. Between Valentine and Peach Springs, SR 66 takes a later routing of US 66, which is straighter and has fewer curves. The older, less straight alignment, used through 1940, can be seen on either side of present-day SR 66. A natural feature and tourist attraction called the Grand Canyon Caverns, just east of Peach Springs, are among the largest dry caverns in the United States.

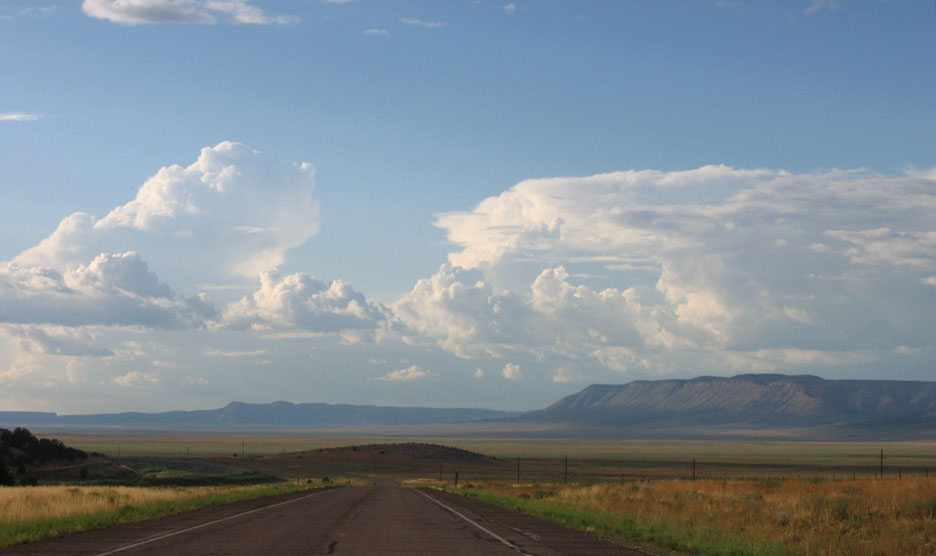
US 66 (now SR 66) west of Seligman

Upon leaving Peach Springs, US 66 curved southeast into the Hualapai Indian Reservation. Shortly afterwards, the highway left Mohave County and continued east into Coconino County. Shortly after entering Coconino County, US 66 entered Yavapai County. The route briefly entered Coconino County again for less than three miles (4.8 km), before crossing into Yavapai County for a second time, where it remained for several miles. This final crossing of the Yavapai–Coconino county line also serves as the present terminus of SR 66. From here on out, US 66 continued southeast as a county-maintained road (known as Crookton Road). This segment was previously the easternmost 16.8 miles (27.0 km) of SR 66, until ADOT retired this section and handed it over to Yavapai County in 1990 for maintenance.

Old US 66 continued in a straight southeasterly direction for 9.5 miles (15.3 km), then made a long curve south and east around a large volcanic bluff. After curving around the bluff, US 66 continued into Seligman, becoming Chino Street (today part of the Seligman I-40 Business Loop) into the center of town. Seligman is the birthplace of the first Historic Route 66 Association of Arizona, established by local barber Angel Delgadillo in 1987. The association obtained the first "Historic Route 66" designation, which the state initially placed on the segment of US 66 between Kingman and Seligman. East of Seligman, old US 66 diverged from the current business route. Where the business route turns south to return to I-40, US 66 headed southeast on Crookton Road. US 66 proceeded to follow Crookton Road through high desert towards Ash Fork.

=== Seligman to Williams ===
DeSoto's Beauty and Barber Shop on old US 66 in Ash Fork

From Seligman, US 66 continued heading southeast for 17.3 miles (27.8 km) on Crookton Road. At I-40 exit 139, the highway briefly took on the route of the present-day Interstate, but curved southeast less than a mile later onto the south frontage road. The volcanic cinder asphalt road curved northeast 1.6 miles (2.6 km) from the Interstate and crossed over a small three-span concrete bridge, rejoining I-40 where the frontage road curves east. In the same spot as present day exit 144, US 66 curved northeast, taking Pine Avenue into downtown Ash Fork. US 66 continued straight onto 8th Street where Pine Avenue turned east, then made a right-hand curve onto Lewis Avenue. Today, Lewis Avenue is a one-way street, heading westbound only. Traffic heading east through Ash Fork must take Park Avenue, one block to the south. Both Lewis and Park make up a one-way pair carrying I-40 Business through town.

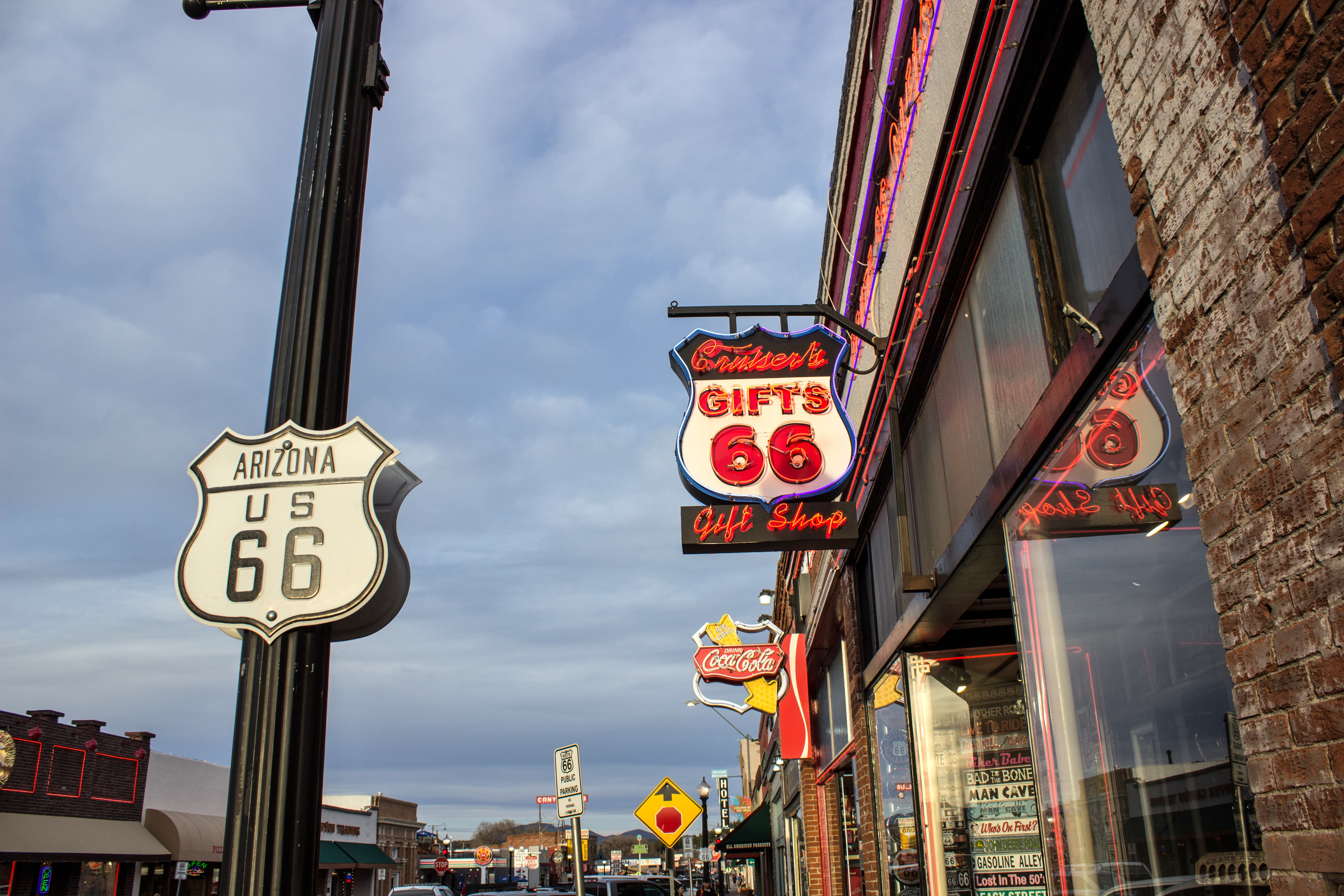
Historic Route 66 through downtown Williams

At the spot where the I-40 Business Loop turns south to become SR 89, there used to be an intersection where US 66 met at a junction with US 89. US 89 was concurrent with US 66 between Ash Fork and Flagstaff. Both US 66 and northbound US 89 continued straight east from this intersection on to a highway alignment which no longer exists. The former highway straddled the north side of I-40, at times, often joining and leaving the present westbound lanes of the Interstate. East of Ash Fork, the route left the high desert terrain and entered a mountainous area, covered with Ponderosa pine forests. US 66/US 89 left I-40 around exit 149, heading northeast along an abandoned section of highway through the Monte Carlo truck stop. Approximately one mile (1.6 km) from the Interstate, the highway turned straight east for 3.1 miles (5.0 km), then wound southeast for one mile (1.6 km), crossing over the Interstate. The old highway made a broad curve less than one mile (1.6 km) southeast of I-40, then curved northeast, merging back into the route of I-40. Today, part of this section of former US 66/US 89 is listed on the National Register of Historic Places (NRHP) as Abandoned Route 66, Ash Fork Hill.

Both US 66 and US 89 split from I-40 again at Bill Williams Loop Road near McClelland Lake. The highway took the loop road for 2.9 miles (4.7 km) south of the Interstate before merging back into the route of I-40. At exit 161, US 66/US 89 curved northeast from I-40, then headed east on Historic Route 66 into downtown Williams. Parts of downtown Williams surrounding former US 66/US 89, including the roadway itself, are listed on the NRHP. The Williams Historic Business District and Urban Route 66, Williams, were added to the NRHP in 1984 and 1989, respectively. East of town, US 66/US 89 met the Santa Fe Railway at an underpass, then curved southeast onto an abandoned road, which tied into Mountain Man Trail in front of the Bearizona Wildlife Park. This was also the spot where US 66/US 89 intersected with the western terminus of SR 64, which headed north towards Valle and the Grand Canyon, while US 66 and US 89 continued east towards Flagstaff.

=== Williams to Flagstaff ===
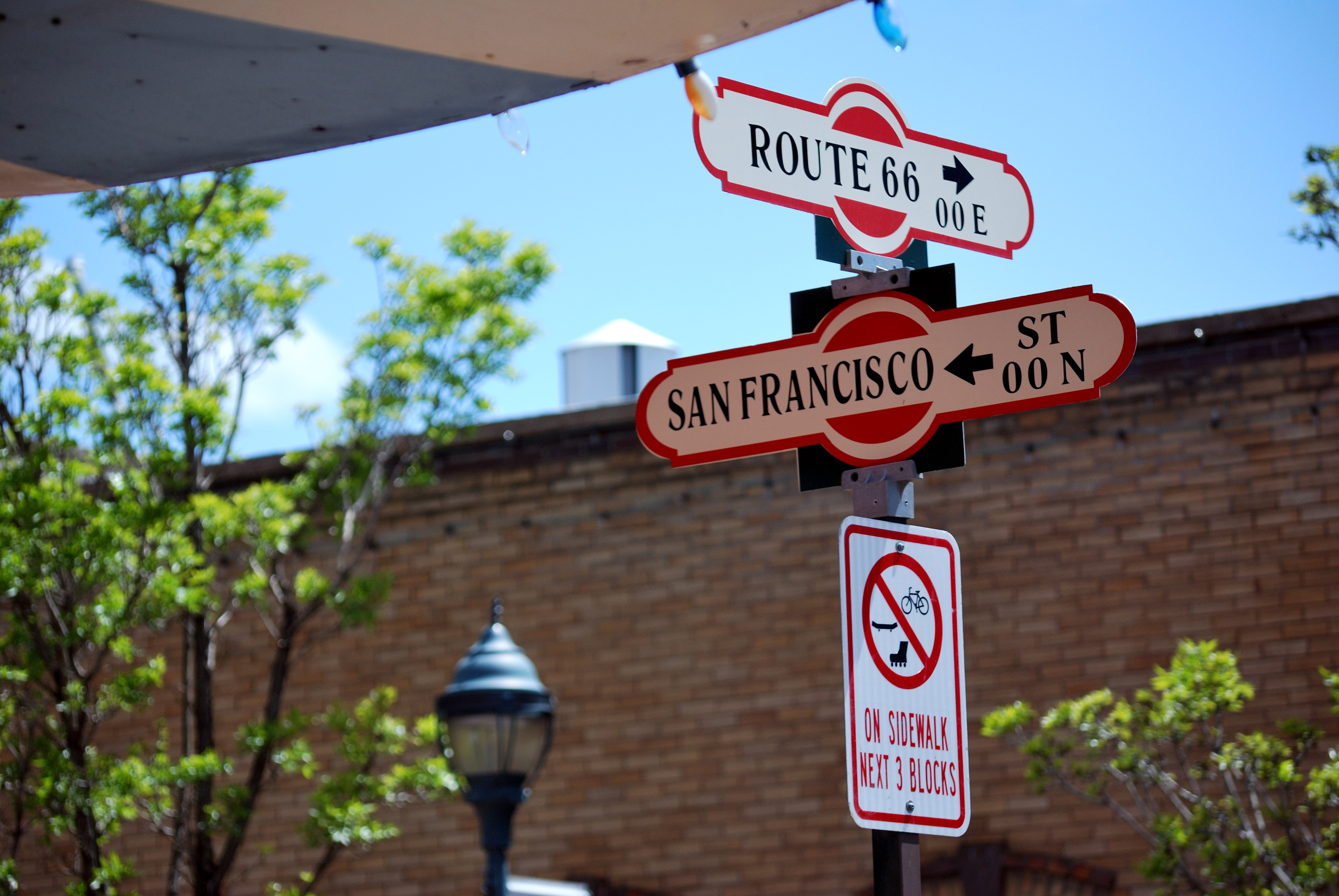
The corner of Historic Route 66 and San Francisco Street in downtown Flagstaff

US 66/US 89 continued east from the SR 64 junction outside Williams on Mountain Man Trail for 2.1 miles (3.4 km), then crossed the present-day route of I-40 diagonally onto Deer Farm Road. Although the highway was paved in 1940, both Mountain Man Trail and Deer Farm Road have been downgraded to county maintained graded dirt roads. The highway skirted the northern shore of Davenport Lake, then crossed present-day I-40 to the south side frontage road, known as Mountain Ranch Resort Drive. US 66/US 89 crossed I-40 a second time at the spot of the current exit 171 onto a road called "Old Route 66". Unlike Mountain Man Trail and Deer Farm Road, Old Route 66 is still paved. The highway then headed east, gently winding through small pine forests, until US 66/US 89 reached the town of Parks. Small sections of Old Route 66 to the west and east of Parks are listed on the NRHP under the name Abandoned Route 66, Parks (1921).

Just southeast of Parks, where Old Route 66 dead ends, US 66/US 89 crossed present-day I-40 diagonally to briefly parallel the Santa Fe Railway, before being subsumed into the route of I-40 once again. The old highway left I-40 again briefly along an abandoned graded curve on the south side of the Interstate just west of the Parks Rest Area. East of the rest area, US 66/US 89 split off a third time onto Bellemont Camp Road. The highway continued diagonally southeast through Bellemont, then merged back into I-40. The eastern end of Bellemont Camp Road (which can not be used as a through route by travelers today) is still paved in original concrete. Heading southeast out of Bellemont, US 66/US 89 used the route of I-40 until reaching present-day exit 191. Here, the highway angled southeasterly on I-40 Business into Flagstaff.

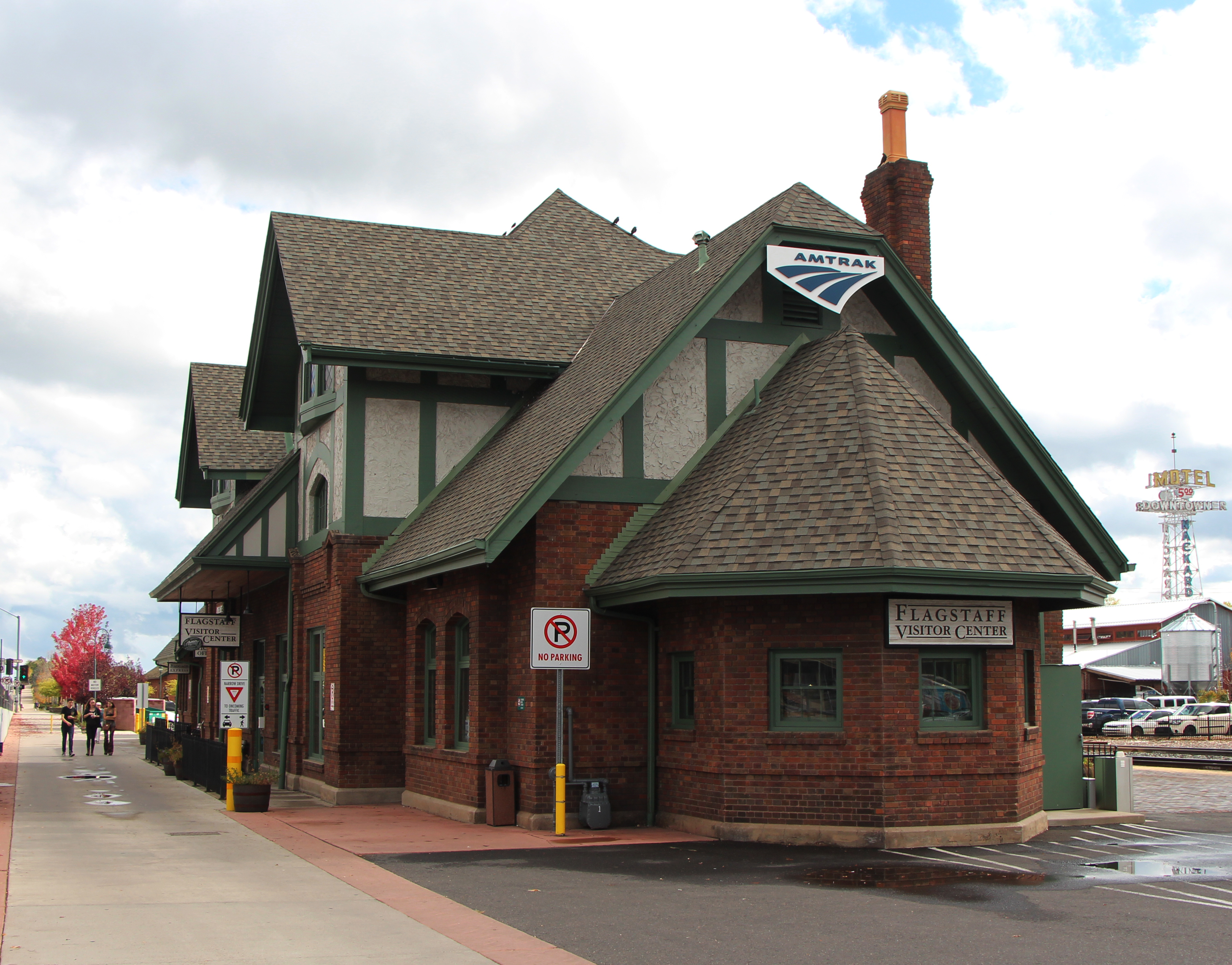
The Santa Fe Railway Depot in Flagstaff

The former route through Flagstaff is officially named "Historic Route 66". At Milton Road, US 66/US 89 intersected with SR 79 at its northern terminus. By 1941, SR 79 had been redesignated as US 89 Alternate (US 89A). US 89A, as its designation suggests, was an alternative, more direct route for US 89 traffic. US 89A provided a shorter travel distance between Flagstaff and Prescott, via Sedona and the mining town of Jerome. Today, US 89A is known as SR 89A. US 66/US 89 continued north on I-40 Business from the junction with US 89A to underpass with the Santa Fe Railway. On the other side of the underpass, the highway curved right onto Santa Fe Avenue and passed through downtown Flagstaff, including the Santa Fe Railway Depot. Just west of the depot is where current US 180 joins I-40 Business, former US 66 and former US 89.

Heading southeast of downtown, paralleling the Santa Fe Railway, US 66/US 89 made two northeasterly curves along with the railroad. At the intersection with Country Club Drive north of I-40 exit 201, current US 180 and I-40 Business split off, heading south to join I-40. This intersection also serves as the current southern terminus of US 89. Just west of this intersection, a later routing of US 66 split off and paralleled the railroad towards Walnut Canyon National Monument and I-40 exit 204 (where the later routing joined the Interstate). The earlier route of former US 66 (used through 1940), and current route of US 89, continue northeast from this intersection towards the Flagstaff suburb of Townsend.

=== Flagstaff to Winslow ===
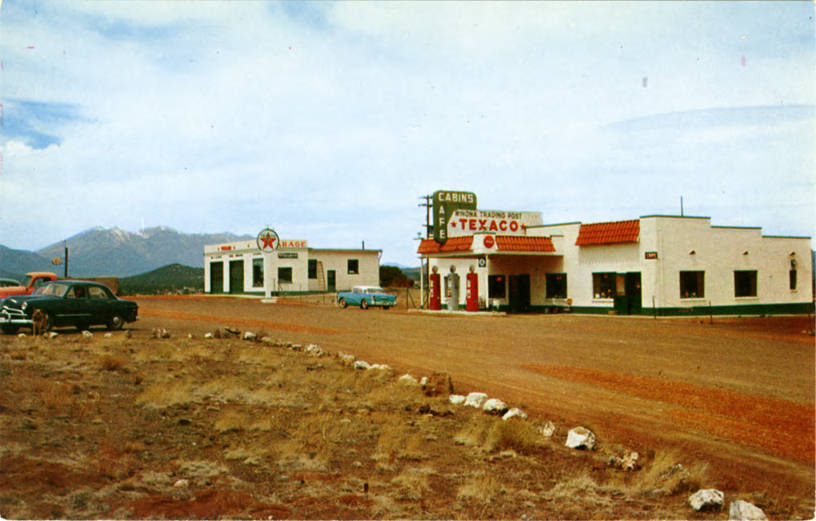
Postcard of the Winona Trading post on old US 66

On the outskirts of the Flagstaff metropolitan area in Townsend, US 66 split from US 89. US 89 heads north towards the Glen Canyon Dam and Page, while old US 66 took an abandoned gradual curve to the east onto Townsend–Winona Road. The highway proceeded to wind through small pine forest wilderness, passing several small communities along the way, heading first east, then southeast near Sunset Crater and several other extinct volcanic cinder cones of the San Francisco Volcanic Field. Shortly before reaching the current route of I-40 east of Flagstaff, US 66 passed through a small unincorporated community called Winona, made famous in the song "(Get Your Kicks on) Route 66". In Winona, US 66 crossed an abandoned steel bridge. Today, the modern road uses a concrete bridge built right next to the older structure. US 66 proceeded to cross over the Santa Fe Railway on an overpass heading out of Winona.

Where Townsend–Winona Road continues south to end at I-40 exit 211, US 66 continued east along the southern side of the railroad on Coconino County Route 394. Approximately 6.6 miles (10.6 km) southeast of exit 211, the county route dead-ends at the westbound lanes of I-40. US 66 continued on an abandoned highway grade southeast of this point (some of which has been overlaid by I-40), then zig-zagged northward, crossing a concrete bridge over a small gulch. North of the gulch, US 66 turned southeast, passing north of the abandoned Twin Arrows travel center. The old highway continued on an abandoned roadway and part of the south frontage road, before gradually being subsumed into the route of present-day I-40. This is also the area where US 66 left the pine forest area which started near Ash Fork and re-entered high desert terrain.

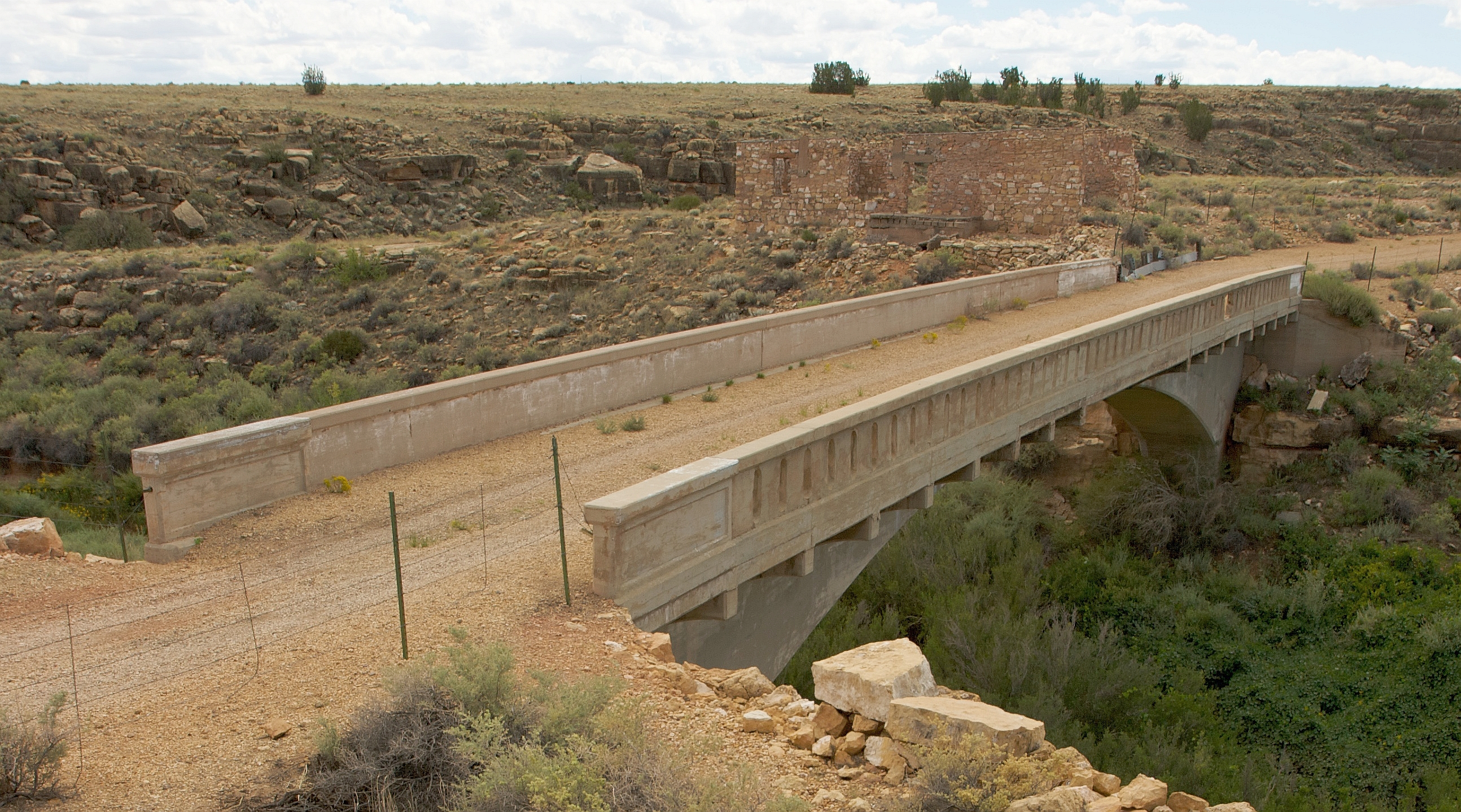
Canyon Diablo Bridge carrying US 66 across cross Canyon Diablo near Two Guns

Near Exit 225, US 66 diverted from I-40 southeast on Buffalo Range Road. Around 4,800 feet (1,500 m) southeast of the Interstate, US 66 curved east on an abandoned highway grade to rejoin the route of I-40, where Buffalo Range Road turns sharply to the southwest. US 66 proceeded to follow I-40 east for 2.6 miles (4.2 km), then split off again to head straight southeast, followed by a sharp curve to the north to cross the Canyon Diablo Bridge over Canyon Diablo into Two Guns. Two Guns, now abandoned, was a popular Old West-themed tourist attraction during the height of popularity of US 66. The most popular attraction at Two Guns was the Apache Death Cave, the site where several Apache individuals were murdered by a group of Navajo individuals. Leaving Two Guns, US 66 made a broad curve to the southeast across present-day I-40 exit 230, heading away from the Interstate on an abandoned roadbed.

About 3.8 miles (6.1 km) southeast of exit 230, and after passing the access road heading south to Meteor Crater, US 66 curved northeast to cross I-40, then made a gradual curve to the southeast. Shortly afterward, US 66 crossed I-40 a second time, where the westbound Meteor Crater Rest Area sits today. Immediately after crossing I-40, US 66 curved northeast to cross over I-40 a third time along with the Santa Fe Railway, then made a sharp turn to the east, followed by a gradual curve to the southeast. At I-40 exit 239, US 66 took the abandoned roadbed back to I-40 and followed the route of the present-day Interstate. About two miles (3.2 km) southeast of exit 239, US 66 left I-40 again onto an abandoned roadbed between the current Interstate and the Santa Fe Railway heading southeast, eventually crossing into Navajo County. Where the I-40 Industrial Spur crosses the railroad, the abandoned roadbed, which carried US 66, tied into "Old West Highway 66", where the highway entered Winslow. At the intersection with current SR 99 (former I-40 Business), US 66 headed southeast into downtown Winslow onto Second Street. Through downtown, US 66 passed the Winslow Visitor Center and Standin' on the Corner Park. At the intersection with Williamson Avenue, where SR 99 turns south with southbound SR 87, US 66 met SR 65 at its northern terminus. From here, SR 65 headed south to its other terminus at the Coconino National Forest boundary, while US 66 continued southeast on present-day northbound SR 87 out of town.

=== Winslow to Holbrook ===
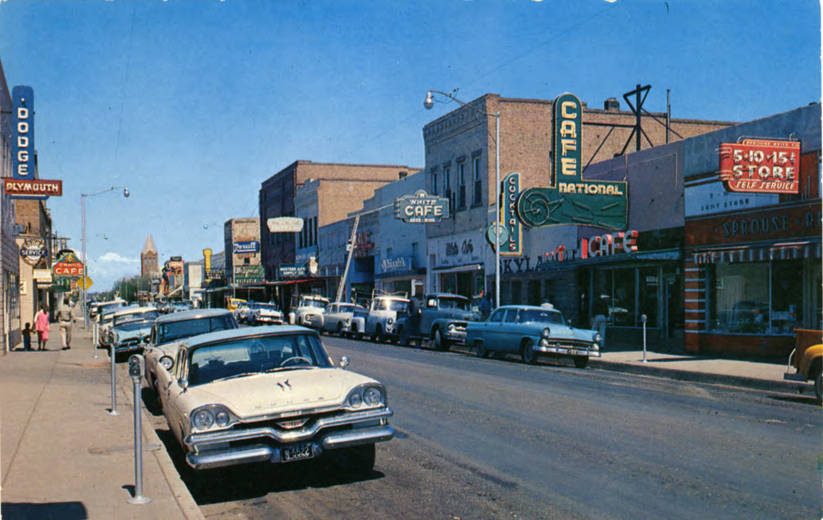
Street view of US 66 through downtown Winslow, c. 1955

Heading east out of Winslow, US 66 split from SR 87 onto an old roadbed, and crossed the Little Colorado River over a bridge that no longer exists. US 66 rejoined SR 87 shortly before the current highway turns north towards I-40 exit 257 and Homolovi State Park. Just north of Winslow, Homolovi State Park preserves over 300 Ancestral Puebloan archaeological sites. Where SR 87 turns north, US 66 continued northeast, merging into I-40. Where I-40 curves southeast, US 66 continued northeast onto Hibbard Road, then made a sharp turn east onto an old roadbed 0.4 miles (0.64 km) from the Interstate. US 66 proceeded to make a gradual S-curve to the southeast and cross a tributary of the Little Colorado River on another no longer extant bridge. The highway continued straight southeast from the bridge crossing for 2.8 miles (4.5 km), then made a sweeping curve south by southeast and crossed I-40.

On the south side of I-40, US 66 made another gradual curve back to the southeast, then a second curve to the east, and merged back into Hibbard Road. Where Hibbard Road ends, US 66 continued diagonally across I-40, then turned immediately south again, crossing I-40 a second time onto the south frontage road. Here, US 66 arrived at the Jack Rabbit Trading Post. The trading post once posted signs up and down the highway for hundreds of miles between Arizona and Missouri. Today, one of the iconic billboards still stands next to the trading post. It is a wooden sign displaying a black jackrabbit on a yellow background with the phrase "Here It Is" spelled in large capitalized red letters on the left side of the jackrabbit. US 66 continued southeast from the trading post along the south frontage road, paralleling the Santa Fe Railway and Little Colorado River.

Main office of the Wigwam Motel in Holbrook at night

At the point where the south frontage road curves northeast to straddle the south side of I-40, US 66 crossed the Interstate becoming Main Street into Joseph City. US 66 through Joseph City is designated today as I-40 Business. East of town, US 66 curved southeast across I-40 onto the south frontage road close to the town post office. Where the frontage road makes a quick U-shape near exit 247, US 66 continued straight. In front of the Cholla Power Plant, US 66 curved to rejoin I-40. US 66 followed I-40 southeast past a reservoir and earthen dam. Where I-40 curves to the east, US 66 split off to the north side of I-40, becoming the north side frontage road. US 66 followed the north frontage road for a short distance, then rejoined I-40 momentarily at exit 283. Immediately after rejoining the Interstate, US 66 diverged, turning to the northeast, and rejoined the north frontage road. Where the frontage road makes a sharp curve to the north, US 66 continued straight east on an abandoned roadbed to I-40 exit 285.

At exit 285, US 66 crossed present-day I-40 into Holbrook becoming Hopi Drive (today signed as US 180 and I-40 Business). Along the western section of old US 66 in Holbrook is the Wigwam Village Motel, a motor court built to resemble a group of tipis. At the intersection of Hopi Drive and Navajo Boulevard, US 180 heads southeast towards Springerville and Silver City, New Mexico, concurrent for a short distance with southbound SR 77. In 1940, this intersection was the western terminus of US 260. US 260 followed the general path of present-day US 180 into New Mexico, where it ended in Deming. US 66 on the other hand, followed northbound SR 77 and I-40 Business on Navajo Boulevard.

=== Holbrook to the New Mexico border ===
Where SR 77 joins I-40 at exit 286, US 66 continued following I-40 Business and Navajo Boulevard north, then northeast, passing through the northeastern edge of Holbrook. At exit 289, US 66 took on the route of I-40, and split off again where exit 292 is today. US 66 followed an old roadbed on the north side of I-40 around the community of Sun Valley, then rejoined the Interstate at the edge of the Painted Desert. US 66 utilized a section of abandoned roadbed east of West Twin Wash, then crossed to a short section of roadbed and bridge on the south side of the Interstate at exit 300. US 66 rejoined I-40 and followed the eastbound lanes to the Painted Desert Indian Center, where the highway briefly split off onto the south frontage road. East of exit 303, US 66 rejoined I-40, where the frontage road curves to run parallel with the Interstate. US 66 diverged from I-40 where the south frontage road curves northeast and heads away from the Interstate.

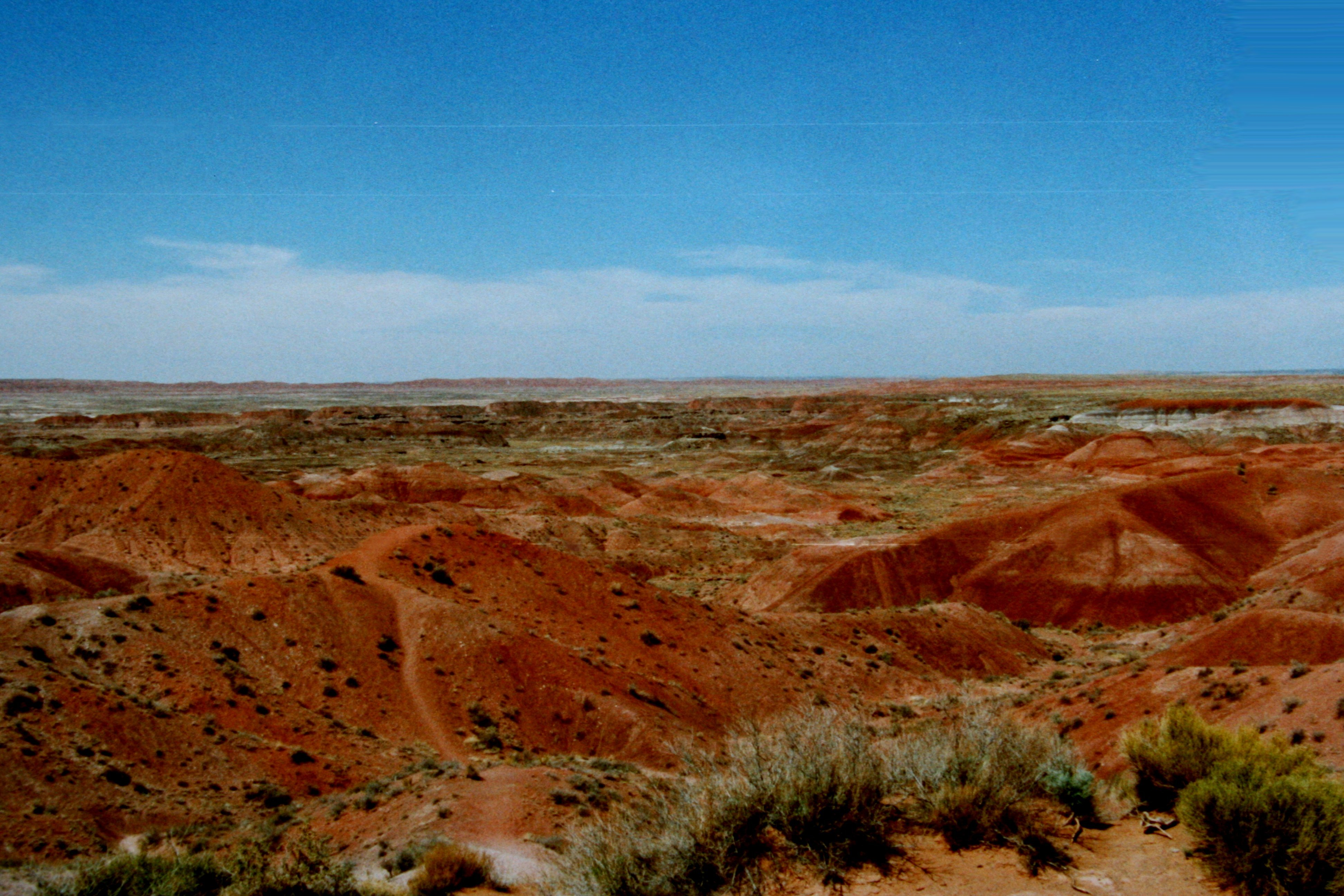
The Painted Desert as seen from former US 66

US 66 followed the south frontage road for 3.2 miles (5.1 km), then diagonally crossed I-40 onto a now-abandoned roadway through the Painted Desert, entering Apache County. Within Petrified Forest National Park, US 66 met at a junction with SR 63, which acted as the main route through the southern end of the park. Today, SR 63 is no longer a state highway and is known as Petrified Forest Road. US 66 continued northeast on the abandoned highway, which was located several miles north of I-40, through the heart of the Painted Desert. 7.3 miles (11.7 km) after the intersection with SR 63, US 66 arrived at the now-abandoned Painted Desert Trading Post. About 6.7 miles (10.8 km) northeast of the trading post, US 66 crossed over to the south side of I-40 onto County Route 7385. US 66 followed County Route 7385 around the Navajo Trading Post and McCarrell Memorial Cemetery to exit 330.

At exit 330, US 66 diagonally crossed I-40 onto an abandoned road heading northeast into Chambers and crossed present-day US 191. US 66 proceeded east on the frontage road 2.3 miles (3.7 km) from the intersection with US 191, then rejoined I-40. Exit 339 in Sanders used to be an at-grade intersection where US 66 met its child route, US 666. From the intersection, US 666 southbound followed present-day US 191 to Springerville, Safford, Willcox and Douglas, while US 66 and northbound US 666 ran concurrently northeast along present-day I-40. Northeast of exit 341, US 66/US 666 followed Querino Dirt Road and crossed over Querino Canyon on the Querino Canyon Bridge. At exit 346, US 66/US 666 rejoined I-40, and followed the Interstate through Houck and Allentown. Immediately northeast of exit 354, US 66/US 666 followed the south frontage road alongside I-40 into the small hamlet of Lupton. East of Lupton, US 66/US 666 merged back into I-40 and crossed into New Mexico, then continued east towards Gallup.

== History ==
US 66 is one of the most popular highways in the history of the state of Arizona. It was also once one of the heaviest traveled highways in the state. Often called the "Main Street of America", US 66 has been the subject of a popular song ("(Get Your Kicks on) Route 66") and television show as well as several movies, including the 1940 movie The Grapes of Wrath and the children's movie franchise Cars. The history of the highway dates back to United States Army expeditions during the mid-19th century and an ancestral highway known as the National Old Trails Road, one of the original transcontinental highways in North America. US 66 itself existed between 1926 and 1985. It was one of the original U.S. Highways in Arizona and, until the arrival of US 60 in 1931, US 66 was one of only two primary transcontinental highways in the entire state (the other was its southern counterpart, US 80). US 66 was used as a means of escape by refugees from the Dust Bowl during the Great Depression, and became an extremely popular tourist highway during the 1950s. The highway was largely bypassed and replaced in the latter half of the 20th century by I-40, which lead to the eventual decommissioning of US 66 as an active U.S. Highway. However, thanks to a preservation effort, largely kicked off by Seligman-based barber Angel Delgadillo, US 66 has made a comeback and is once again a popular tourist destination for travelers from around the world.

=== Background ===
National Old Trails Road
- Location: Topock–Lupton
- Length: 419 mi (674 km)
- Existed: 1914–1927

In 1853, United States Army Lieutenant A. W. Whipple traversed the northern end of New Mexico Territory to survey a route for a proposed transcontinental railroad. Lieutenant Whipple was followed by Lieutenant Edward Fitzgerald Beale in the winter of 1858 and 1859. Beale created a second survey of the northern territory along the 35th Parallel, this time for a proposed wagon road. The wagon road was to start in Fort Smith, Arkansas, and travel to the Colorado River on the California border. Beale returned later in 1859 with a group of men to construct the road. The outfit was complemented with 22 camels as well as tools and supplies needed to build the wagon road. Beale's men constructed a path 10 feet (3.0 m) wide by removing rocks and vegetation in the way. The new road became known as Beale's Wagon Road, becoming a major artery for westward expansion and immigration. The road remained a popular means of travel until 1883, when the Atchison, Topeka and Santa Fe Railway was completed through northern Arizona.

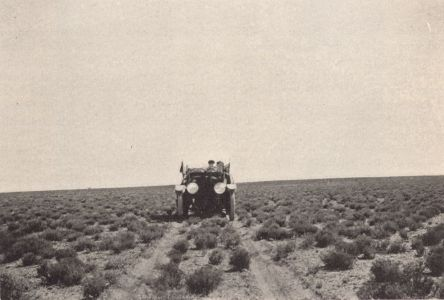
An early automobile driving on the National Old Trails Road near Holbrook, c. 1915

In 1914, the state of Arizona had finished reorganizing an earlier system of territorial roads into a new state highway system, managed by the Office of the State Engineer. Besides converting the two existing territorial maintained roads into new state highways, the Office of the State Engineer also acquired several roads not previously maintained by the state. One of the new acquisitions was Beale's Wagon Road. Now a state highway, Beale's Wagon Road was designated the Santa Fe Highway by the state. Santa Fe Highway started at the Colorado River in Topock, extending north through Kingman, then east through Flagstaff to Holbrook, where it headed southeast through Springerville into New Mexico. Also in 1914, the National Old Trails Road, an early transcontinental auto trail, was designated over the Santa Fe Highway.

Outside Arizona, the National Old Trails Road ran from Washington, DC, to Los Angeles, California. The National Old Trails Highway Association also had plans to construct a new road through Lupton for a shorter more direct route to New Mexico. For a short time, the National Old Trails Road was partnered with a local auto trail known as the Ocean-to-Ocean Highway, which acted as an alternate route going from the National Old Trails Road to Phoenix and Yuma. Disagreements soon arose between the managers of both highways. The National Old Trails Highway Association preferred the main route be the highway to Topock, while the Ocean-to-Ocean Transcontinental Highway Association preferred the route to Yuma. Both organizations eventually ended their partnership and went in opposite directions.

Historical US 66 route markers

1926 design

1956 design (Eastbound)

1956 design (Westbound)

1960 design (Eastbound)

1960 design (Westbound)

1963 design

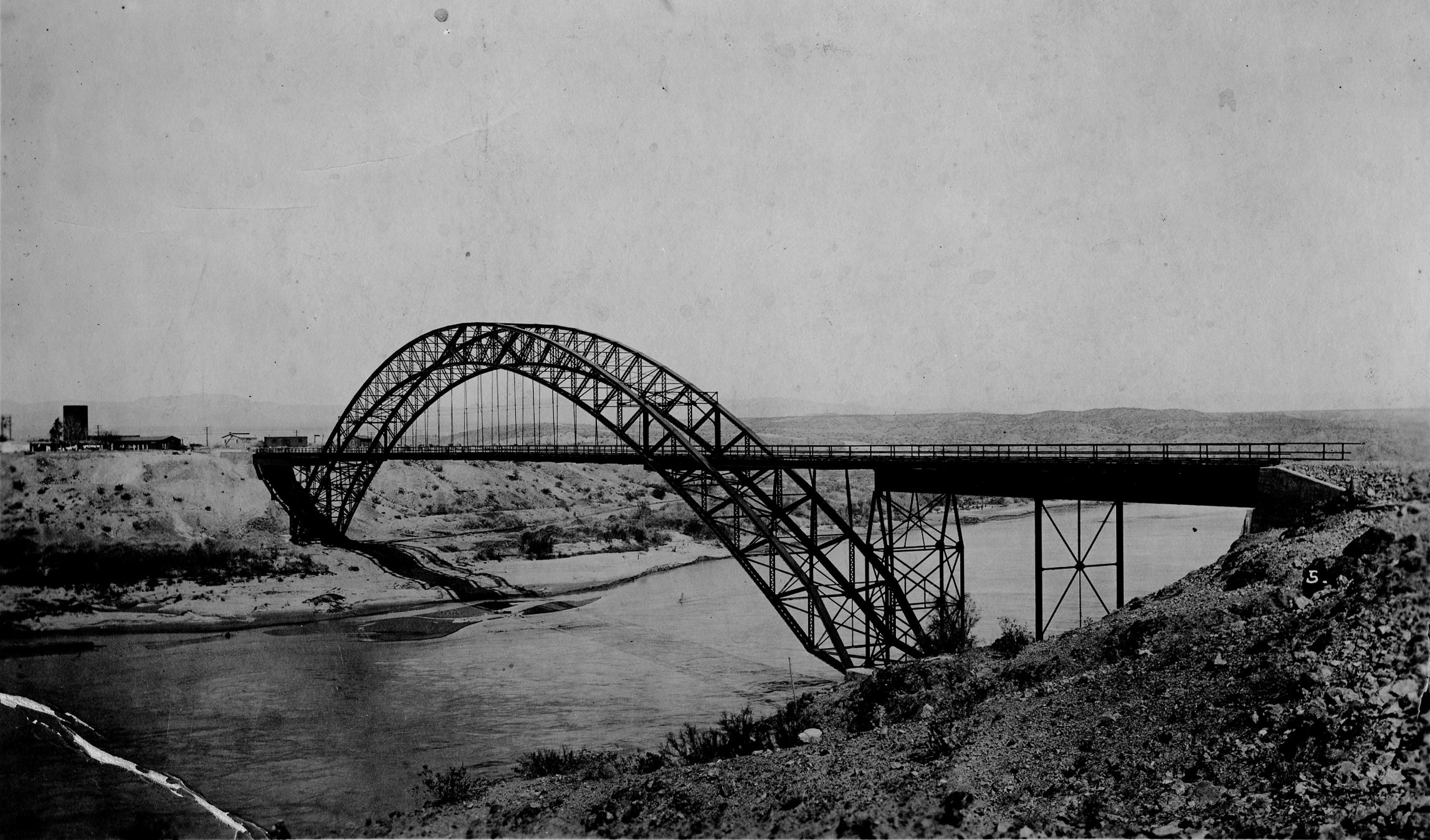
A view of the Old Trails Bridge, looking southeast from the California side of the Colorado River, c. 1920.

In the early days, National Old Trails Road traffic crossing the river utilized a ferry crossing between Topock and Needles on the California side of the river. The ferry, established in 1890, was used until 1914, when a river flood destroyed it. In response, the upstream Red Rock Bridge, owned by the Santa Fe Railway, became the new river crossing for National Old Trails Road motorists. The railroad had allowed cars to use the bridge so long as the drivers were willing to pay a toll. Construction started on the Old Trails Bridge, a dedicated automobile bridge, on June 30, 1915, and was completed several months later on February 20, 1916. The bridge was paid for by the states of California and Arizona as well as the Bureau of Indian Affairs at a cost of $75,000 (equivalent to $1.49 million in 2024). The bridge itself was a steel arch structure designed by San Bernardino County surveyor S. A. Sourwine. Once construction on the Old Trails Bridge had been completed, National Old Trails Road traffic was moved onto the new bridge and the Red Rock Bridge became train only once again. From 1916 to 1928, the Old Trails Bridge held the record of being the longest three-hinged arch bridge in the United States.

Between 1915 and 1922, the National Old Trails Highway was surfaced with gravel between Topock and Oatman as well as between Seligman and Holbrook. A small section just outside Ash Fork was also reconstructed and realigned at this time, becoming the first road to ever be paved using volcanic cinders. The highway was also paved through Flagstaff in 1921 using concrete. In 1921, the Arizona state highway system was reorganized again following the passage of the Federal Aid Highway Act of 1921. The state no longer referred to the National Old Trails Road as the Santa Fe Highway, and instead re-designated Topock–Kingman–Ash Fork Highway and the Ash Fork–Flagstaff–Winslow–Holbrook Highway west of Holbrook. East of Holbrook, the original route through Springerville became the Holbrook–Springerville–New Mexico State Line Highway, while the recently constructed new route through Lupton became the Holbrook–Lupton Highway.

=== U.S. Highway designation ===
Across the country, the numerous named auto trails began creating problems for motorists. Many auto trails had confusing alternate routes and were not always the most direct routes; also, multiple different auto trails often overlapped on the same roadway. During the annual meeting of the American Association of State Highway Officials (AASHO) in San Francisco, California, in 1924, Minnesota state maintenance engineer A.H. Hinkle lobbied the organization to reorganize the nation's transcontinental highway system, suggesting a nationwide numbering system of well-located and direct interstate highways be implemented. AASHO agreed to Hinkle's ideas, passing a resolution on November 20, 1924, to develop a better organized interstate highway system. AASHO then sent a recommendation to the U.S. Secretary of Agriculture, Howard M. Gore, to create a joint board between the Bureau of Public Roads and state highway officials from across the nation to develop a new organized system of numbered interstate highways. Gore acted on the recommendation in 1925, establishing the Joint Board on Interstate Highways.

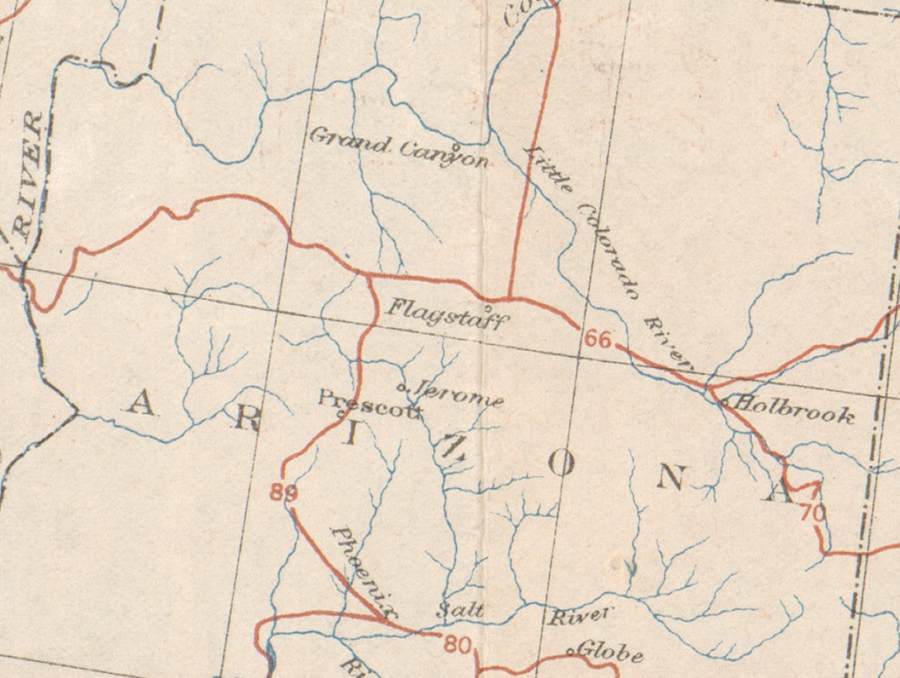
A 1926 map of proposed US 66 through Arizona, which was finalized and approved on November 11 of the same year

After intensive discussion, debating, and planning, the Joint Board submitted a mostly finalized proposal to the new Secretary of Agriculture, William M. Jardine, on October 26, 1925. The new system would use signs in the form of a white shield with black outlines, displaying the name of the state in which the highway was traveling through, the letters "U.S." to symbolize the highway system being an interstate numbering system rather than a regional state system, and the number of the route below the letters "U.S." on the shield. The highways would also be numbered in an organized fashion with the highest numbers being in the northeastern United States and lowest being in the southwest. Even-numbered routes would travel east to west while odd-numbered routes would travel north to south. The major north–south routes would end with the number "1" as the last digit, while major transcontinental east–west routes would utilize the number "0" as the last digit. This proposed system would come to be known as the United States Numbered Highway System.

Among the new proposed highways was a roughly crescent-shaped route named U.S. Route 60 (US 60). US 60 would run from Los Angeles, California, to Chicago, Illinois. However, after a major disagreement and argument between proponents of the Chicago-to–Los Angeles route and dignitaries from the state of Kentucky, AASHO moved the proposed US 60 designation was moved onto a different highway between Virginia Beach, Virginia, and Springfield, Missouri. This was done to give the Kentucky proponents the benefit of having a route ending in "0" passing through their state. The future Chicago–Los Angeles route was first intended to be re-designated US 62, but was instead re-designated US 66 at the request of the Chicago–Los Angeles route proponents. After some other alterations were made to the newly proposed U.S. Highway System, the system was ratified and approved by AASHO on November 11, 1926, making all the newly proposed routes official. With this, a large portion of the National Old Trails Road through the southwestern United States, including Arizona, was designated as a section of US 66. The original route of the National Old Trails Road southeast of Holbrook through Springerville became the westernmost section of US 70 (now US 180), making the junction of the old and new National Old Trails alignments the national western terminus of the new US 70.

The US 66 designation was recognized by the newly formed Arizona State Highway Department (sometimes abbreviated as ASHD) after the state highway system was reorganized on September 9, 1927. The reorganization entailed a transition from state-named highways to state- and U.S.-numbered highways. Arizona now had two principal cross-country U.S. Highways across the entire state: US 66 served the northern part of the state, while the southern half of Arizona heavily promoted and focused on US 80. Proponents of US 80 in Arizona had given their highway the nickname "The Main Street Through Arizona". At the same time, the newly formed U.S. Highway 66 Association dubbed US 66 the "Main Street of America", which may have been in response to the US 80 nickname. From 1927 onward, a friendly in-state competition existed between proponents of US 66 and US 80 within Arizona.

=== The early years ===
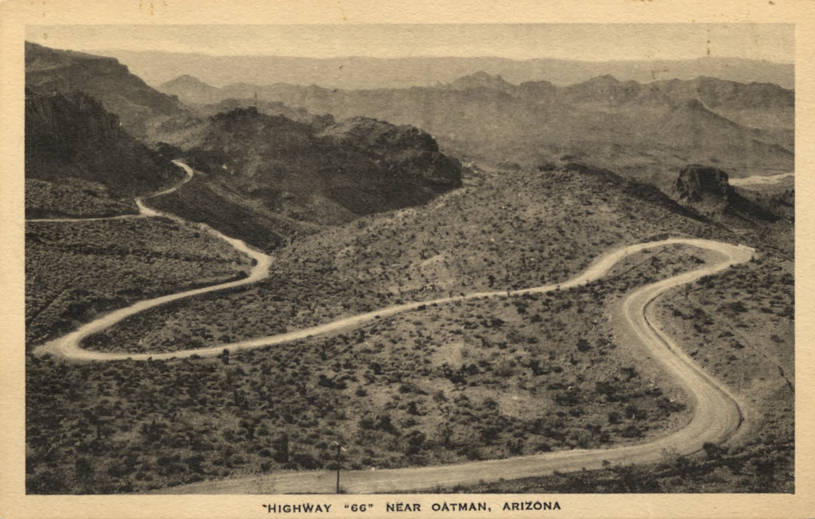
US 66 through Sitgreaves Pass near Oatman in the early 1930s

The name "National Old Trails Road" was officially dropped from US 66 in Arizona by December 1927. Immediately, the counties US 66 traveled through in northern Arizona began campaigning for the highway to be fully paved. In the middle of 1928, numerous bond issues passed by cities, states and the federal government were allocated to help begin paving work on US 66 across the nation, including a large portion of the route within Arizona. The total sum of the multiple bond issues was $41 million (equivalent to $590 million in 2024). To further supplement the cost of paving US 66, $150,000 was (equivalent to $2.16 million in 2024) raised by the U.S. Highway 66 Association on June 7, 1928. Extensive preparation work in the form of multiple aerial surveys and a detailed study regarding finances and local construction logistics was also undertaken to aid in paving through Arizona.

In 1928, almost none of US 66 was paved in Arizona, save for a stretch of highway between Flagstaff and Winona. This section had been paved back in 1921 with concrete mixed with locally sourced volcanic cinder. The highway was given a non-paved secondary surfacing (another term for gravel surfacing) between the Colorado River and 39 miles (63 km) east of Peach Springs. A section of US 66 from Crookton through Ash Fork to Williams was also paved in secondary surfacing. This section was approximately 21 miles (34 km) long. Secondary surfacing was also extant on a section of highway running from Bellemont to Flagstaff, as well as a section between Meteor Mountain (just east of Canyon Diablo) and Holbrook. The remainder of US 66 was graded, but had no improved surfacing of any kind.

The official 1929 Highway Department map depicted surfacing and road conditions along US 66 as being mostly unchanged since the previous year, although newspapers reported otherwise. By December 1929, reconstruction was underway between Holbrook and New Mexico on completely rebuilding and realigning the highway. Similar work was being undertaken between Holbrook and Winslow, including the construction of two new bridges. Paving work began between Flagstaff and Winslow as well as between Topock and Kingman. On December 29, 1929, the state highway commission reported $508,594.94 (equivalent to $7.29 million in 2024) had been allocated in state funds that year to rebuild US 66, with $305,982.79 (equivalent to $4.39 million in 2024) of said funds being spent to improve over 71 miles (114 km) of the highway by years end. Much of this work included grading and draining work, paving work, gravel surfacing and bridge construction.

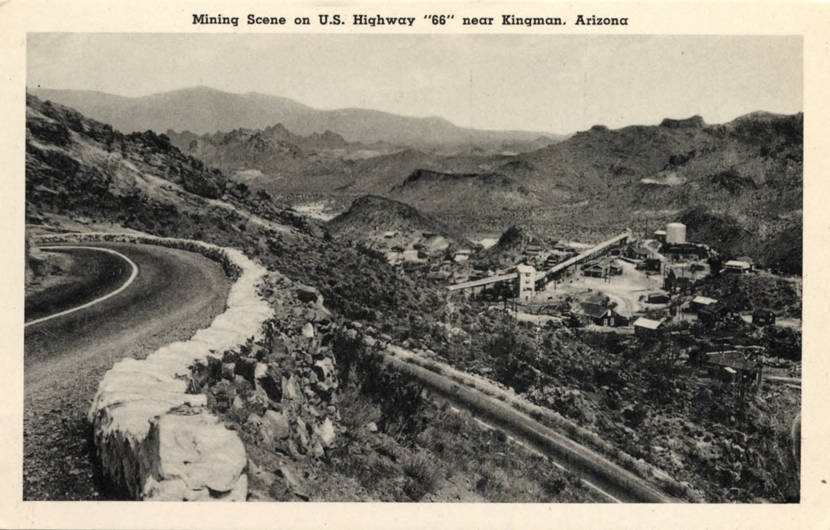
Postcard of US 66 passing a mining operation at Goldroad, on the western side of Sitgreaves Pass near Oatman

By 1930, noticeable changes were made to the highway. The route between Oatman and a point west of Peach Springs had reverted to an unimproved dirt road. However, the route was given a gravel surface between Williams and Flagstaff. Between Topock and Oatman, the highway was fully paved, as was the section between Meteor Mountain and Winslow. The highway had also been realigned and straightened between Seligman and Crookton. By 1931, all of US 66 between Flagstaff and Winslow was paved. Gravel surfacing was administered to US 66 from the New Mexico state line to an area southwest of Lupton. By 1932, US 66 had been paved between Crookton and Ash Fork. Road surfacing also existed on the section of highway improved the year earlier, heading southwest from New Mexico through Lupton. Construction work was underway on US 66 between Seligman and Crookton, as was the highway between Oatman and Kingman. Despite the amount of work completed, a delegation of citizens representing towns along US 66 traveled to Phoenix on May 8, 1932, demanding the State Highway Commission to block funding for improvements to US 80 in favor of further improvements to US 66. Ultimately, the commission passed off the demands of the delegation and did not divert attention away from improving US 80.

On June 5, 1933, Arizona Governor Benjamin Baker Moeur sent letters to state highway commissioners asking for selective amounts of state funding to be diverted from US 66, US 89 and US 260 instead be allocated to the construction of US 60 near Globe. Moeur further specified he wanted enough funding be left over for the other highways so as not to halt construction and maintenance operations. The request was met with controversy and protest, much of which came from the U.S. Highway 66 Association. On June 18, 1933, the association sent a train of 200 delegates from towns along US 66 and US 89 to attend a highway hearing the next day and hold active demonstrations against Moeur's requested budget change. The demonstrations included worded banners displaying support for the three affected U.S. Highways, marching and the demonstrators singing a song called "Sixty-Six the Main Street of Arizona" by a citizen from Holbrook. One of the demonstration and delegation leaders explained to a reporter for the Arizona Republic newspaper, "We feel that Highway 66, Highway 89 and Highway 260 have not gotten a 'square deal' from the highway commission in the past five years... We are here to make a gentlemanly appeal to the highway commission to do the right thing by the northern part of the state." The delegation included people from Kingman, Seligman, Ash Fork, Williams, Flagstaff and Holbrook as well as US 89 and US 260 supporters from Concho, Adamana, St. Johns and Prescott. Despite the demonstrations and strong opposition raised by the US 66 delegation, the highway commission ultimately decided in favor of Moeur's request on June 20. Approximately $145,000 (equivalent to $2.78 million in 2024) from the 1933 to 1934 budget was transferred from projects along US 66 to the construction of US 60.

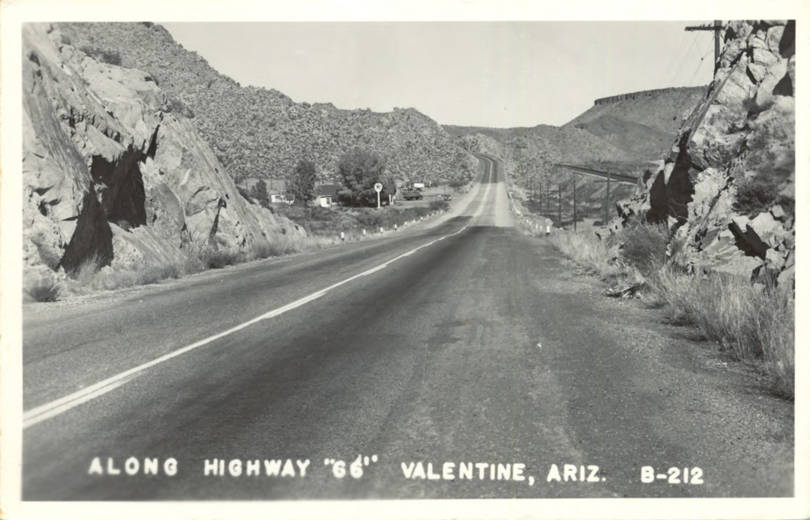
US 66 near Valentine in the late 1930s

By 1934, despite budget cuts to US 66, the construction work between Seligman and Crookton had extended to the previously paved section of US 66 northwest of Crookton. Construction work was also underway on US 66 between Ash Fork and Williams, part of the route from Williams to Flagstaff and the unpaved section of highway between Kingman and Peach Springs through Hackberry. Most of the highway between Holbrook and Lupton through Sanders and Navajo was also undergoing construction. Road surfacing work was complete on US 66 between Williams and Bellemont, on a small section going through Peach Springs, between Oatman and Kingman and a small piece heading a few miles northeast of Holbrook. At this point, most of US 66 through Arizona was paved or undergoing resurfacing. The first known use of natural landscaping by the Arizona State Highway Department was performed along US 66 the same year.

By 1935, almost all of US 66 between Topock and Peach Springs had been paved. road surfacing had also been completed on all of US 66 between Crookton and New Mexico. The last unpaved sections of US 66 remaining were a 20-mile (32 km) section of heading west from Crookton through Cedar Grove and a 6-mile (9.7 km) section heading northeast out of Valentine. Although these two sections were not yet paved, they were surfaced with rock or gravel, meaning all of US 66 at least had improved surfacing. Passage of the Emergency Relief Appropriation Act of 1935 by the United States federal government gave the Arizona State Highway Department the necessary provisions and funding to replace an at-grade railroad crossing in Winslow with an underpass in 1936. The entirety of US 66 in Arizona was paved by 1938. This made US 66 one of the first highways in Arizona to be completely paved. However, the title of first fully paved U.S. Highway in Arizona was taken three years earlier by the second incarnation of US 70, which entered Arizona from California through Ehrenberg and exited near Duncan into New Mexico. Albeit the paving work had been completed long before the Ehrenberg–Duncan route had been designated as part of US 70. On January 24, 1938, the entirety of US 66 between Los Angeles and Chicago was designated as the Will Rogers Memorial Highway by the U.S. Highway 66 Association.

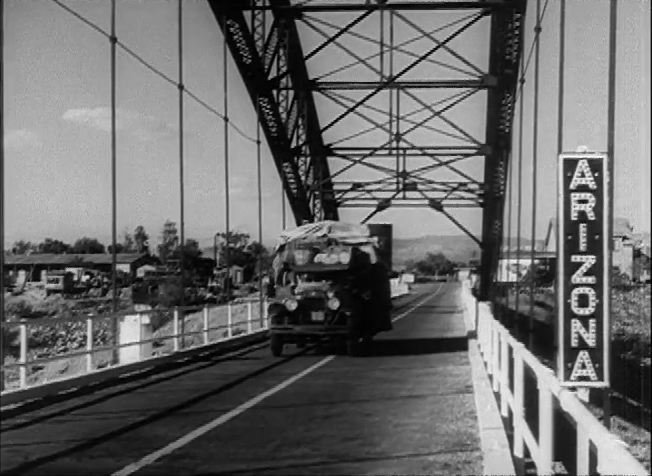
A scene from the 1940 feature film, The Grapes of Wrath, showing the Joad family crossing the Colorado River into California on the Old Trails Bridge

US 66 also played a large role during the Dust Bowl era of the Great Depression. Refugees seeking a better life from drought and impoverished areas of the Great Plains states, often referred to as "Okies" (which started an insulting term used by long time California residents), extensively used US 66 as a means of escaping the heavily affected areas, looking for a better life in California. Western Arizona in particular provided a great obstacle for refugees traveling down US 66 to California: they would often have trouble crossing the Black Mountains on US 66 over Sitgreaves Pass. Many of their trucks would end up wrecked at the bottom of the mountain slopes next to the highway due to failed axle bearings. Refugee drivers were among the earliest US 66 travelers to hire locals to drive their often overloaded vehicles over the pass for them. The grades on this section US 66 would sometimes pose a large enough challenge to these vehicles that driving the trucks in reverse over the pass was often necessary.

After reaching the other side of the pass, the refugees would coast their vehicles down the other side to save gas. If the refugees needed gas, a man named Ed Edgerton ran a gas station complex known as "Ed's Camp" at the top of the pass. Most of the time, Edgerton was willing to barter with the refugees if they had little or no money. Sometimes, the refugees would trade or pawn valuable possessions to Edgerton for gas. Other times, Edgerton would have them work jobs at his station to earn their gas. Upon reaching the other side, the refugees would often establish camps along the Colorado River near Topock and Needles on the California side before continuing their journey. The rest of the route through Arizona was also difficult for refugees, due to the extremes of the desert heat during summertime. Famed author John Steinbeck would later go on to describe some of these experiences in his novel, The Grapes of Wrath. Part of the novel detailed the experiences of the Joad family, a fictional refugee family from Oklahoma taking US 66 through Arizona to California. In 1940, the novel was adapted by 20th Century Fox into a movie starring actor Henry Fonda as Tom Joad. Several scenes in the movie were filmed along US 66 in Arizona, including scenes where the family crossed the Arizona–New Mexico state line near Lupton and the Old Trails Bridge over the Colorado River in Topock.

=== The golden age ===
During the first three years of American involvement in World War II, civilian travel on US 66 declined greatly. In 1941, 17,600 cars a month were traveling westbound on the highway between New Mexico and California. By 1942, the number had decreased to 13,680 cars a month, then dropped to 7,040 cars a month by May 1943. This was largely because gasoline available to civilians was heavily rationed for the war effort and harder to come by. However, military traffic heavily used the highway during this time as several military installations were located near US 66. One such installation was the Navajo Army Depot in Bellemont. The military often transported troops, weapons and supplies. Despite the decline in civilian travel, people leaving the east coast to find wartime work in California often took US 66.

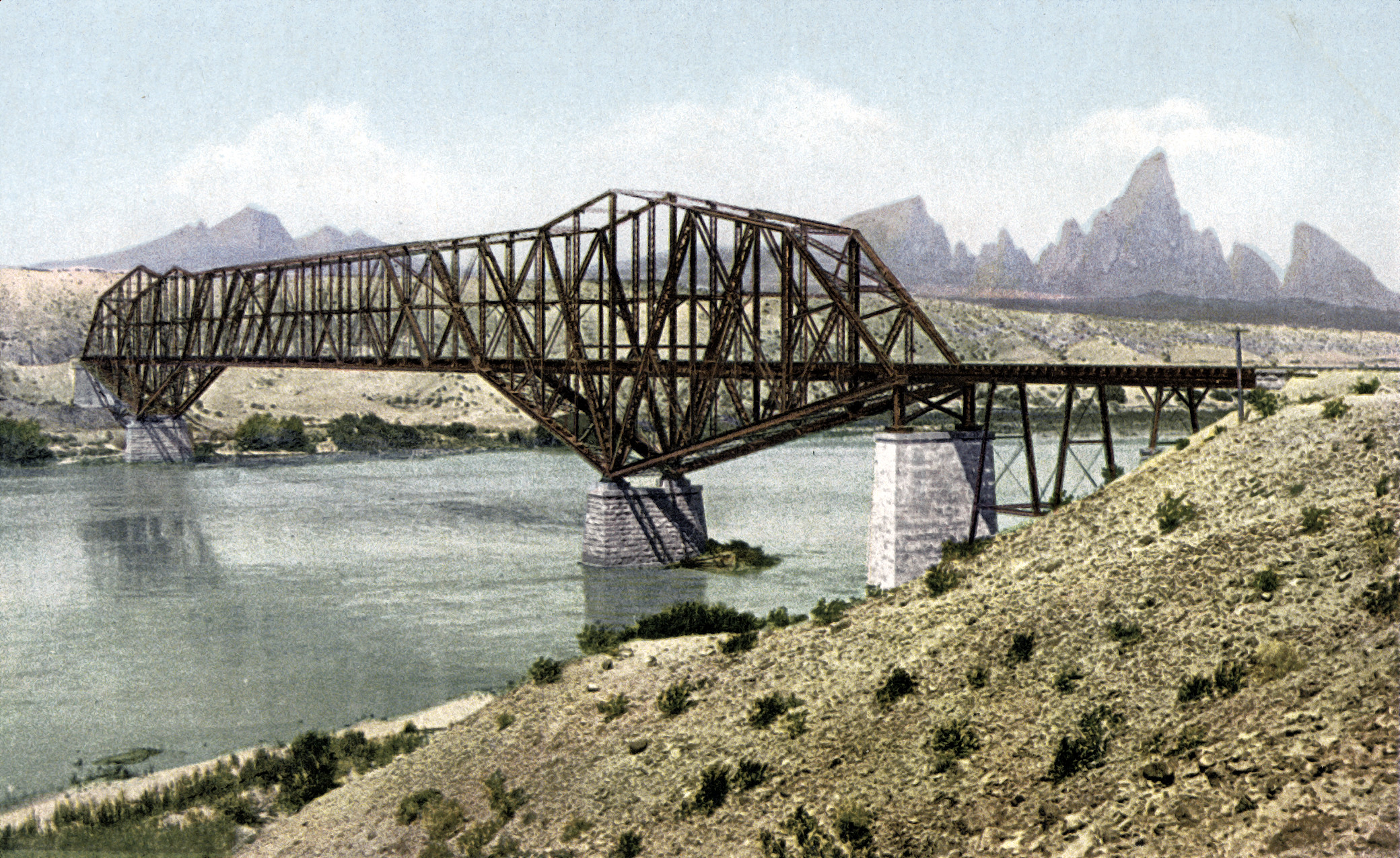
A postcard of the Red Rock Bridge from 1901. From 1947 to 1966, the bridge carried US 66 across the Colorado River between Needles and Topock.

At the end of the war, many of the people who had gone to California for work returned home to the east coast on US 66. The eastward migration caused US 66 traffic to increase from record low numbers to the highest volume of traffic the highway had seen up to that point. By October 1945, 700–800 cars a day were traveling down US 66 in Arizona and some cars had as many as 17 people inside them. At night, there were up to 137 cars parked on the side of the road, so the occupants could sleep during the night. Drivers often traveled down the highway at dangerous speeds or drove for long periods, becoming fatigued. This, in tandem with increasing traffic, caused the number of fatal car accidents to rise exponentially. Between January and October 1945, 198 people were killed in car accidents on US 66. As a result, the Arizona Highway Patrol had to greatly increase the number of patrolmen on US 66 to crack down on reckless driving.

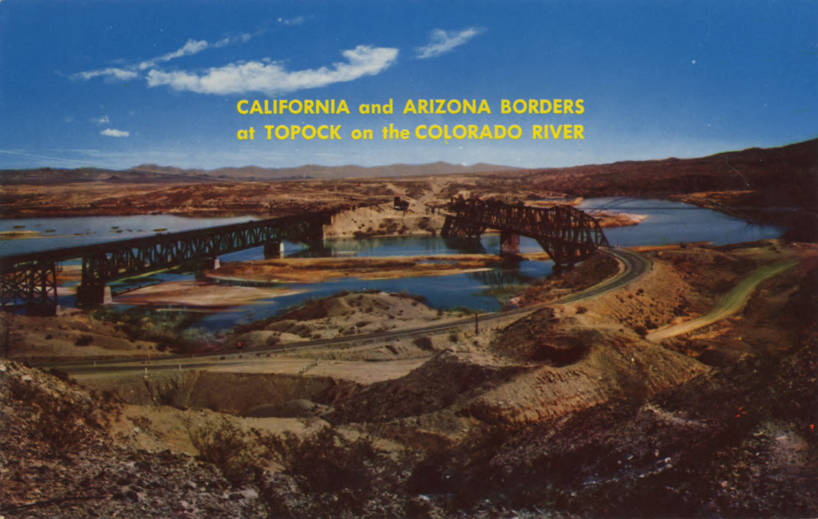
A postcard depicting the Colorado River crossings between Needles and Topock, following the re-routing of US 66 over the Red Rock bridge, which can be seen in the center. The replacement railroad bridge is on the left, while the Old Trails Bridge is on the right.

In 1945, the Santa Fe Railway constructed a new rail bridge over the Colorado River in Needles and Topock, upstream from the Old Trails and Red Rock Bridges. At the same time, California and Arizona had been looking to replace the Old Trails Bridge, as the structure had become insufficiently narrow and too weak for post-war truck and car traffic. Highway engineers determined the retired Red Rock Bridge could serve as a more than adequate replacement. The Red Rock Bridge had previously been rebuilt and reinforced twice during the early 20th century to handle heavier and faster train traffic.

The railroad had planned on tearing down the Red Rock Bridge, but instead donated the structure to the states of California and Arizona along with 2.5 miles (4.0 km) of right of way on either side of the bridge. This was done partially due to the cost of converting the bridge into a highway crossing being less expensive than demolishing the veteran structure. Both states began surveying and planning to rebuild the Red Rock Bridge into a new Colorado River crossing for US 66. Once planning had been completed, the state governments of California and Arizona agreed to split the cost of conversion. The tracks were removed from the bridge and a concrete roadway put in its place. On May 21, 1947, the Red Rock Bridge was reopened to automobile traffic for the first time in 31 years, this time as a dedicated highway crossing. US 66 was immediately re-routed off the Old Trails Bridge onto the Red Rock Bridge. The Old Trails Bridge was originally to be demolished but was instead purchased by the Pacific Gas and Electric Company and now carries part of a natural gas pipeline between California and Texas.

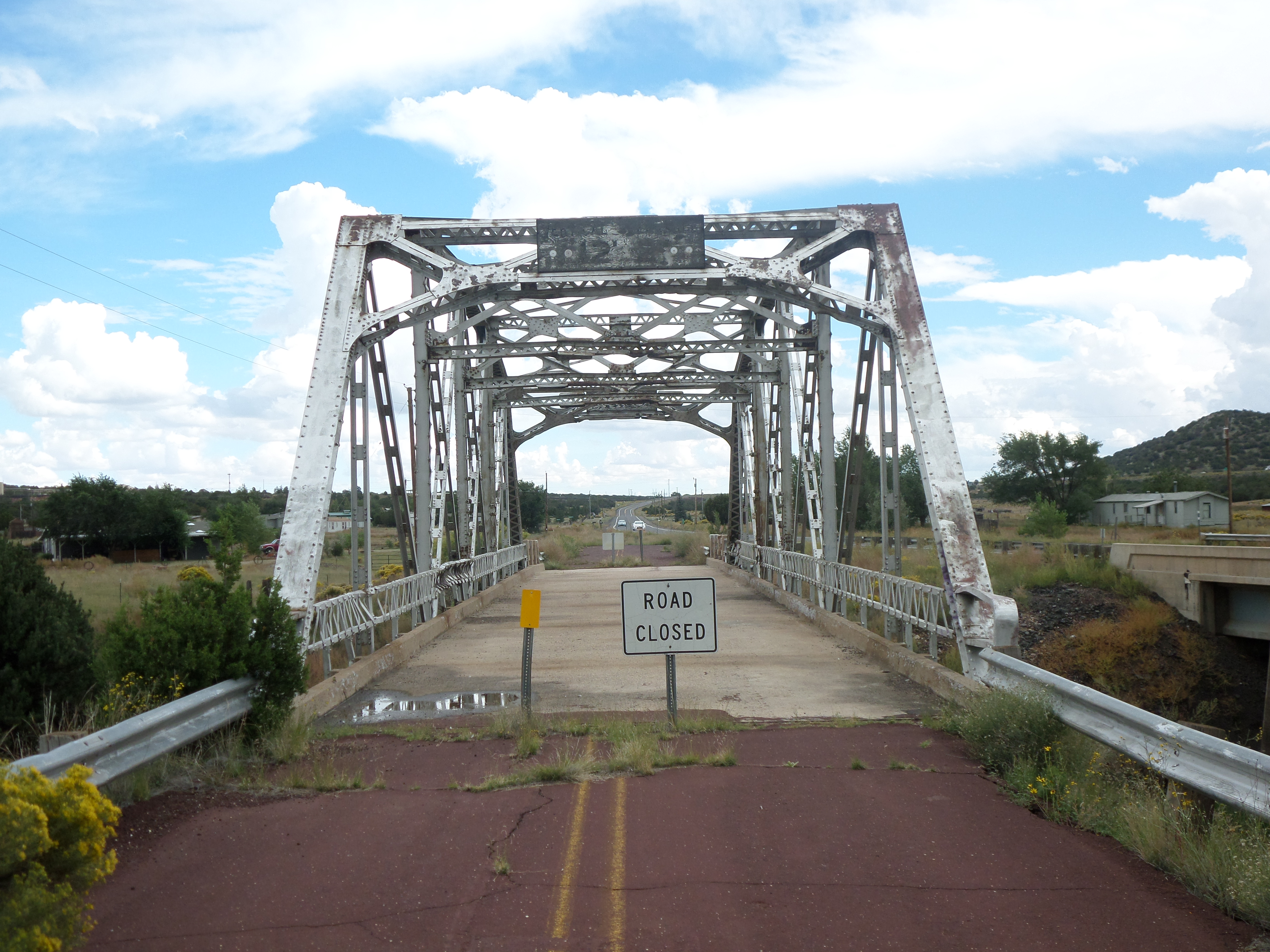
The abandoned steel truss Walnut Canyon Bridge on the old Winona route of US 66

In 1946, the Arizona State Highway Department began planning a major improvement along US 66 between Flagstaff and Winslow. The plan was to construct a new 11.5-mile (18.5 km) highway between Flagstaff and Winona to shorten the travel time and the overall distance between Winslow and Flagstaff. The project was estimated to cost around $1,300,000 (equivalent to $15.9 million in 2024). Originally meant to be a single contract construction project, the bypass was later divided into two separate contracts. Bidding for both construction projects were opened on January 9 the same year with a scheduled completion date of September 30, 1947. The Fisher Construction Company and Tanner Construction Company were both awarded the contracts, with Fisher to construct the first 4 miles (6.4 km) east of Flagstaff and the remaining 7.5 miles (12.1 km) to be constructed by Tanner. By May 10, 1946, 30 percent of the four-mile (6.4 km) section being constructed by Fisher was completed.

By September 1946, both Tanner and Fisher had made substantial progress on their respective sections, with all excavation on the Tanner section completed, with preliminary paving work beginning. Both sections, however, were disconnected by the Santa Fe Railway which cut the new highway in half. At the time, planning for a railroad overpass was being undertaken by the State Highway Department. The H.L. Royden Company was awarded the contract for constructing the overpass. The new highway was opened to traffic in October 1947 and US 66 was re-routed onto it, bypassing the hamlet of Townsend between Flagstaff and Winona. The overall cost of the project ended up being $1,433,400 (equivalent to $17.5 million in 2024). Although the route between Townsend and Winona was removed from the state highway system, the section from Flagstaff to Townsend remained part of US 89, which was concurrent with US 66 from Townsend to Ash Fork. Following the re-routing, the concurrency was shortened to an intersection between the old and new route in eastern Flagstaff.

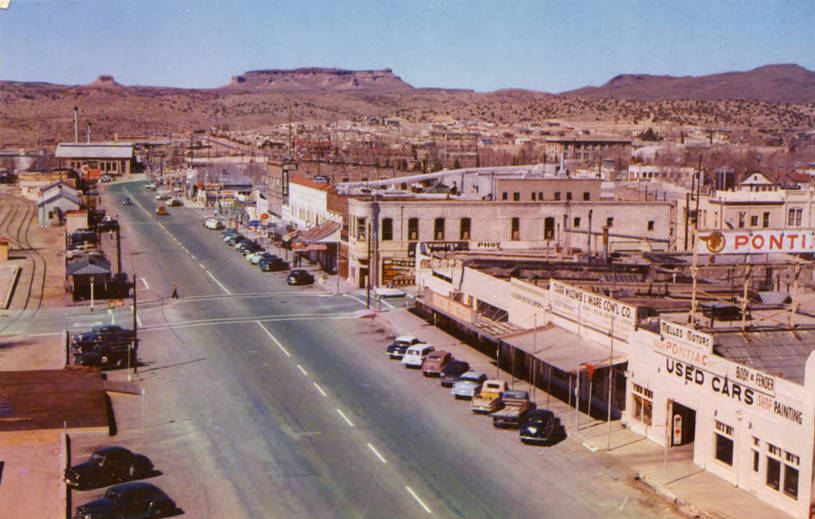
US 66 through downtown Kingman, c. 1940–1949

In 1950, the State Highway Department began planning construction of a new alignment of US 66 through Yucca. Construction was planned to start near Topock and head northeast through Yucca to connect with the existing highway near Kingman. At the time, the section between Topock and Kingman still followed the steep and winding path through Oatman into the Black Mountains and through Sitgreaves Pass. This section was built across this rough terrain instead of following the more level route to the east adopted by the railroad because the road followed the National Old Trails highway which was for gold mining in Oatman and Goldroad (now a ghost town). It was fraught with hairpin turns and was the steepest along the entire route, so much so that some early travelers, too frightened at the prospect of driving such a potentially dangerous road, hired locals to navigate the winding grade. By September 1950, the Oatman bypass was given priority on the state highway construction agenda, as US 66 was crucial to military defense traffic. The State Highway Department contracted the Phoenix-Tempe Stone Company to construct the first six miles (9.7 km) of the new route on September 15, 1950, at a cost of $262,152 (equivalent to $2.7 million in 2024).

By early 1951, the bypass was under construction. Phoenix-Tempe was awarded a second contract on February 1, 1951, to build an overpass over the Santa Fe Railway in Yucca along with the approach roads to the overpass. In April 1951, a contract to construct 10 miles (16 km) of the new bypass was given to the W.J. Henson company for $234,872 (equivalent to $2.27 million in 2024). The Highway Department created another contract job in October 1951 to pave and construct a further 18 miles (29 km) of the bypass route, in hopes of speeding up the project. The Phoenix-Tempe company was again awarded the contract. Despite the highway's priority and rushed construction, the Yucca Overpass was delayed for several months due to a shortage of available steel. The steel was finally delivered to begin the overpass construction on January 25, 1951.

Construction of the bypass continued through late 1951 to the middle of 1952. By August 1952, construction on the bypass was winding down. By this point, 28 miles (45 km) had been completed with the final 17 miles (27 km) under construction. The bypass was completed and opened to traffic on September 17, 1952. The overall construction of the bypass from 1950 to 1952 was done at record speed at the time, being the fastest major highway construction project within the state's history. US 66 was rerouted onto the new bypass, removing Oatman from US 66. The new route ran along level ground close to the railroad, from Topock to Kingman through Yucca. The bypassing of Oatman lead to the town's decline and near abandonment, while Yucca enjoyed a small period of increased success from US 66 traffic. Oatman Highway remained an undesignated state highway until September 2, 1955, when it was completely transferred to Mohave County.

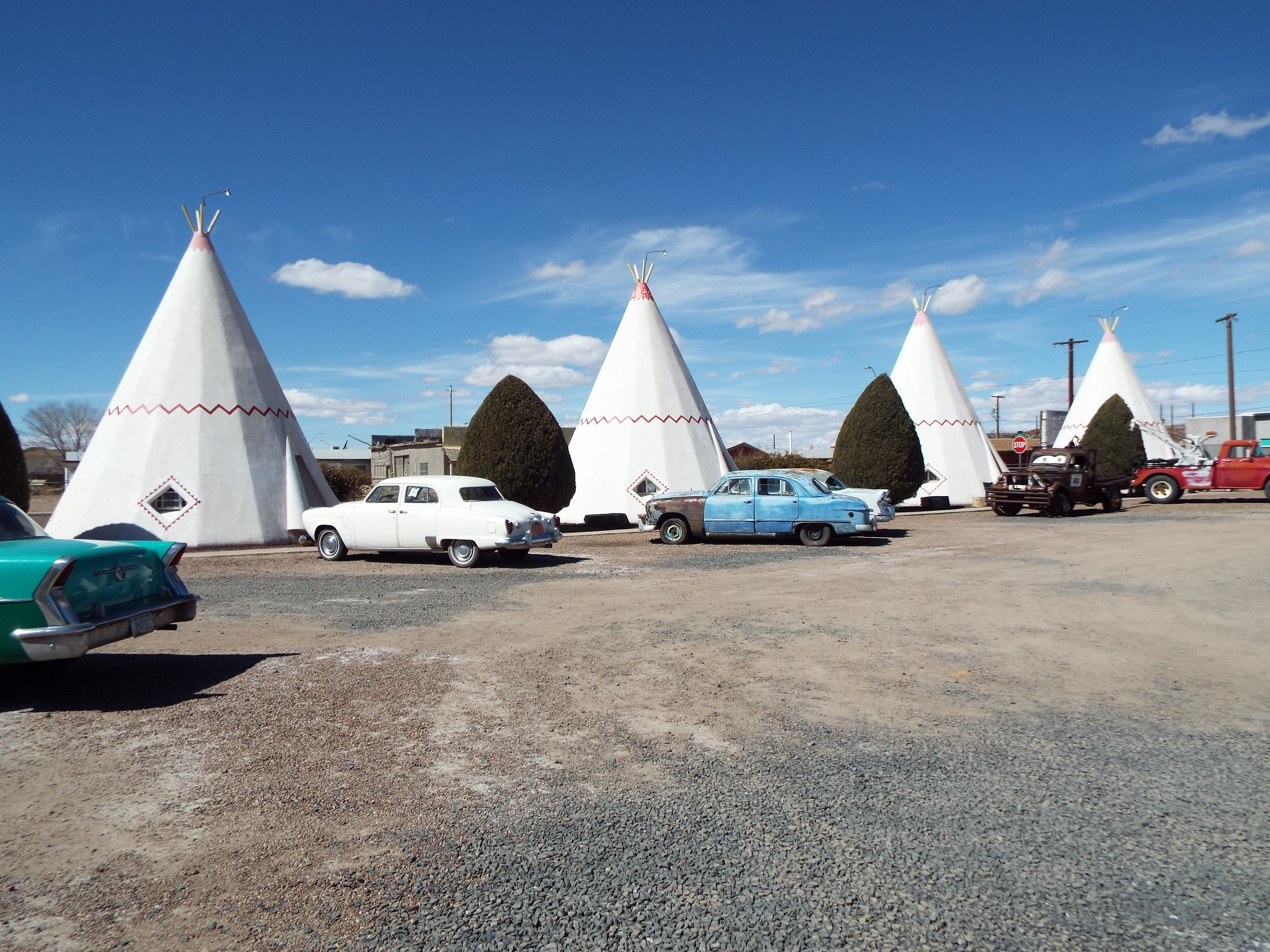
The Wigwam Motel in Holbrook

During the late 1940s and early to mid-1950s, the popularity of US 66 greatly increased. There was a great increase in postwar driving, with more people taking the nation's roads than in decades past. To meet the increase in postwar travel, the number of restaurants, gas stations and motels along the route grew. The number of creative attractions and landmarks also grew, in an attempt to attract further tourism, such as the Wigwam Motel in Holbrook, where every room was built to resemble a Native American tipi. Other popular tourist attractions and stopping points along the highway included the Two Guns, the Twin Arrows Trading Post, Painted Desert Trading Post and Grand Canyon Caverns.

American actor and musician Bobby Troup composed the song "(Get Your Kicks on) Route 66", while traveling down the highway with his wife in 1941. This song was later covered by popular musician Nat King Cole who made it into a best selling record. US 66 travelers found useful advice through a guidebook, written by author Jack D. Rittenhouse, titled aptly, A Guide Book to Highway 66. US 66 also became well known for the unusual advertisements placed along the highway by Burma-Shave, a popular shaving cream manufacturer of the time. The era between 1945 and 1956 is often considered the height of popularity of US 66 travel. The popularity of the highway led to the Columbia Broadcasting System (CBS), an American television broadcast network, to air a television show called Route 66 in 1960.

=== The decline of Route 66 ===
The creation of I-40 marked the decline and eventual end of US 66.

The Arizona State Highway Department had spent a total of $19 million (equivalent to $176 million in 2024) on US 66 alone between 1944 and 1954. This was largely due to the gigantic increase in traffic on US 66 through Arizona over the last decade. A Flagstaff-based newspaper once stated that US 66 carried the largest number of interstate travelers of any highway in Arizona. By 1954, more than one million cars a year were traveling down US 66 from New Mexico to California. The increased traffic had also led to a greater number of car accidents and traffic jams, the latter of which earned US 66 the unfortunate reputation of being "The World's Largest Traffic Jam". By 1956, at least one out of six deaths resulting from car accidents in Arizona took place on US 66. This helped the highway earn another negative nickname, "Bloody 66".

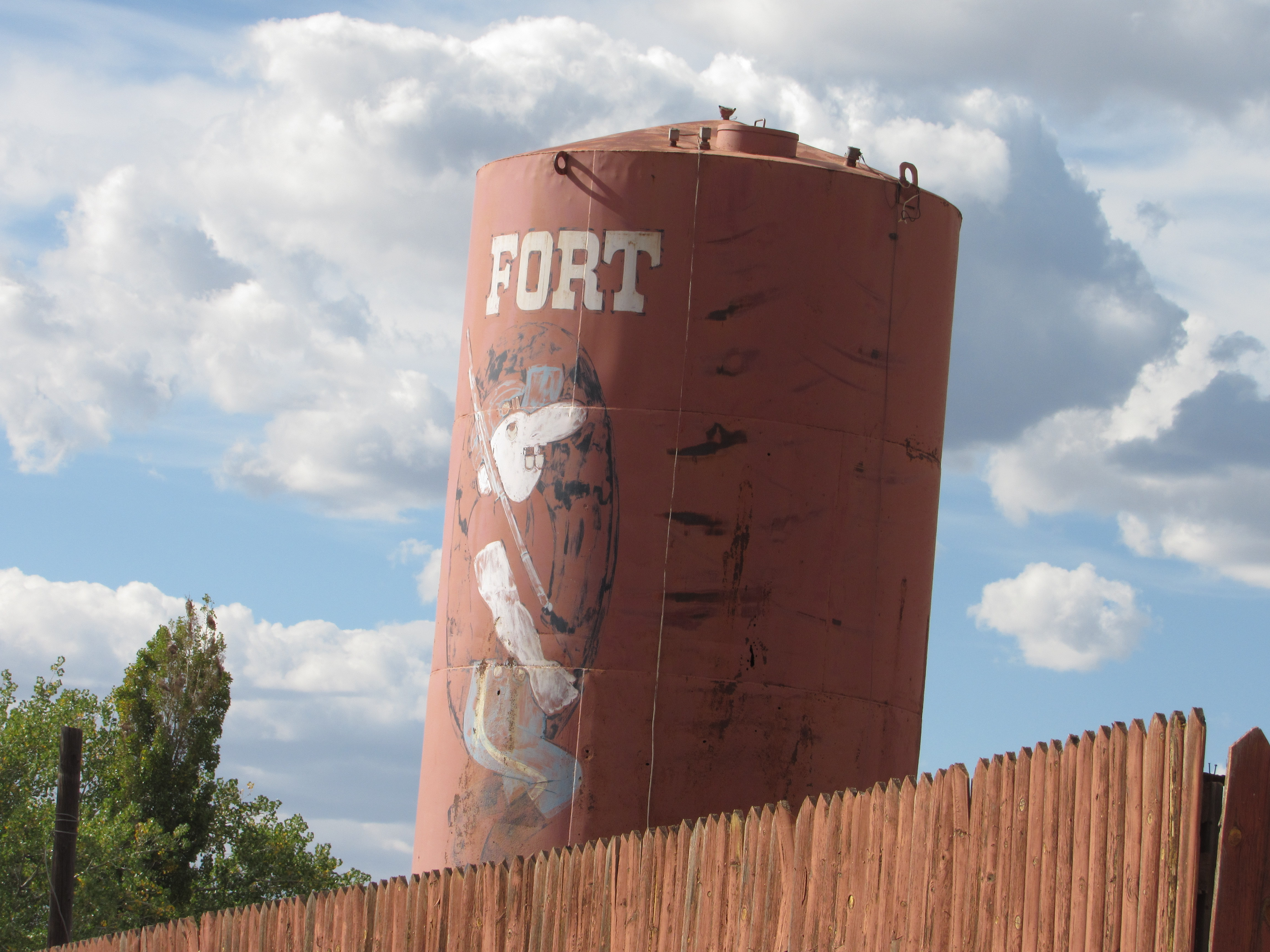
Abandoned water tower in Houck, Arizona. Part of a replica of the set of F Troop that was an attraction along Route 66.

The rough shape, narrowness and safety issues along US 66 and similar highways in Arizona contributed to public sentiment towards rebuilding and improving safety along the state's highways. In 1954, President Dwight D. Eisenhower heavily endorsed the long-standing idea of constructing a nationwide network of four-lane divided superhighways. Originally proposed back in the 1930s, this system of nationwide freeways would have entirely controlled access through the entry and exit ramps, as well as grade-separated interchanges with other highways, roads, and railroads. The new freeways would also include smoother grades coupled with more gradual curves. These massive changes in highway construction were intended to help increase traffic flow and greatly reduce car accidents occurring on the national highway network. Eisenhower pushed the United States Congress to accept the idea and appropriate funding for the new system. Congress finally approved the proposal with the passage of the Federal Aid Highway Act of 1956, bringing into existence the Interstate and Defense Highway System. Several U.S. Highways in Arizona were chosen to become the corridors for the new Interstates, including US 66, which was slated to be replaced by I-40.

By December 1960, approximately 15 miles (24 km) of US 66 had been rebuilt into the first section of I-40 to open in Arizona, and a further 23 miles (37 km) of US 66 was also undergoing conversion into I-40. By October 1962, 15.4 miles (24.8 km) of US 66 between Williams and Flagstaff was being rebuilt into parts of I-40. The new section was completed and opened to traffic later the same year. In 1966, a new four-lane steel bridge was opened over the Colorado River, replacing the Red Rock Bridge. US 66 was moved onto the new bridge, running concurrently with the new I-40 across the river. The Red Rock Bridge was closed following the opening of the new bridge and sat completely abandoned for over a decade. Unlike the Old Trails Bridge, the Red Rock Bridge would never be repurposed. In 1976, the bridge was entirely dismantled. Today, only concrete pilings remain where the bridge once stood.

By September 1967, over 115 miles (185 km) of I-40 had been constructed or rebuilt from sections of US 66, with another 82.4 miles (132.6 km) under way. I-40 around Flagstaff was completed and opened to traffic in 1968, bypassing US 66 and US 89 through town. By 1971, almost all of US 66 east of Flagstaff had been rebuilt into I-40, save for the city streets through Winslow, Joseph City and Holbrook. I-40 had also been completed around Flagstaff and west to the junction between SR 64 and US 66 east of Williams. Another section of I-40 was complete between Seligman and Ash Fork, with a tiny 3-mile (4.8 km) section completed just east of Ash Fork. Almost all US 66 had been converted into I-40 between Kingman and Topock as well, save for a seven-mile (11 km) section east of Topock and a 12-mile (19 km) section south of Kingman. A small section of I-40 had also been completed between Kingman and a junction with US 93 about 13 miles (21 km) south of Hackberry.

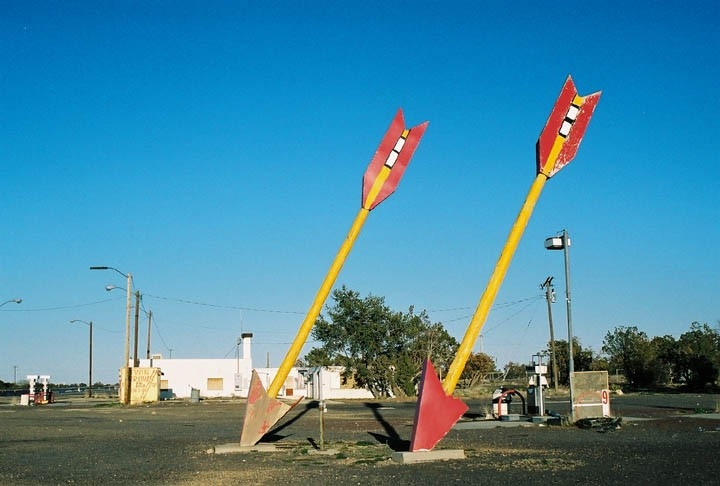
The abandoned trading post at Twin Arrows, one of several attractions along US 66 to fall victim to the route's decline

Controversy came with the construction of I-40. There was a large opposition to freeway bypasses around the towns along the route. Much of the opposition came from town officials and businessmen, all too familiar with the decline of Oatman caused by the 1952 bypass. A large political effort was mounted across several towns along US 66 to block the construction of any further bypasses. The bypass revolts gained considerable attention in the Arizona State Government, with state legislators considering the idea of banning freeway bypasses in Arizona. In the end, the movements did little to stifle the Interstate construction. However, the movement did give the many communities along US 66 some extra time. The state government agreed not to construct the bypasses until all other sections of I-40 had been completed, in hopes of giving the US 66 towns time to adjust to the upcoming changes.

In 1978, the I-40 bypasses were completed around Seligman and Kingman. The Seligman bypass was followed by three bypasses around Ash Fork, Winslow and Holbrook opening in 1979. Despite being open to traffic, the Holbrook bypass would not be completed until 1981. The Joseph City bypass was completed and opened in September 1980. The final bypass was opened around Williams on October 13, 1984, receiving a special ceremony. By far the largest bypass was the section of I-40 constructed between Kingman and Ash Fork. Rather than follow US 66, which formed a roughly arc shaped path through Valentine, Peach Springs and Hackberry, this section of the Interstate went straight east, leaving several communities and a large section of US 66 several miles north of the new main highway. This entire section was completed in 1978.

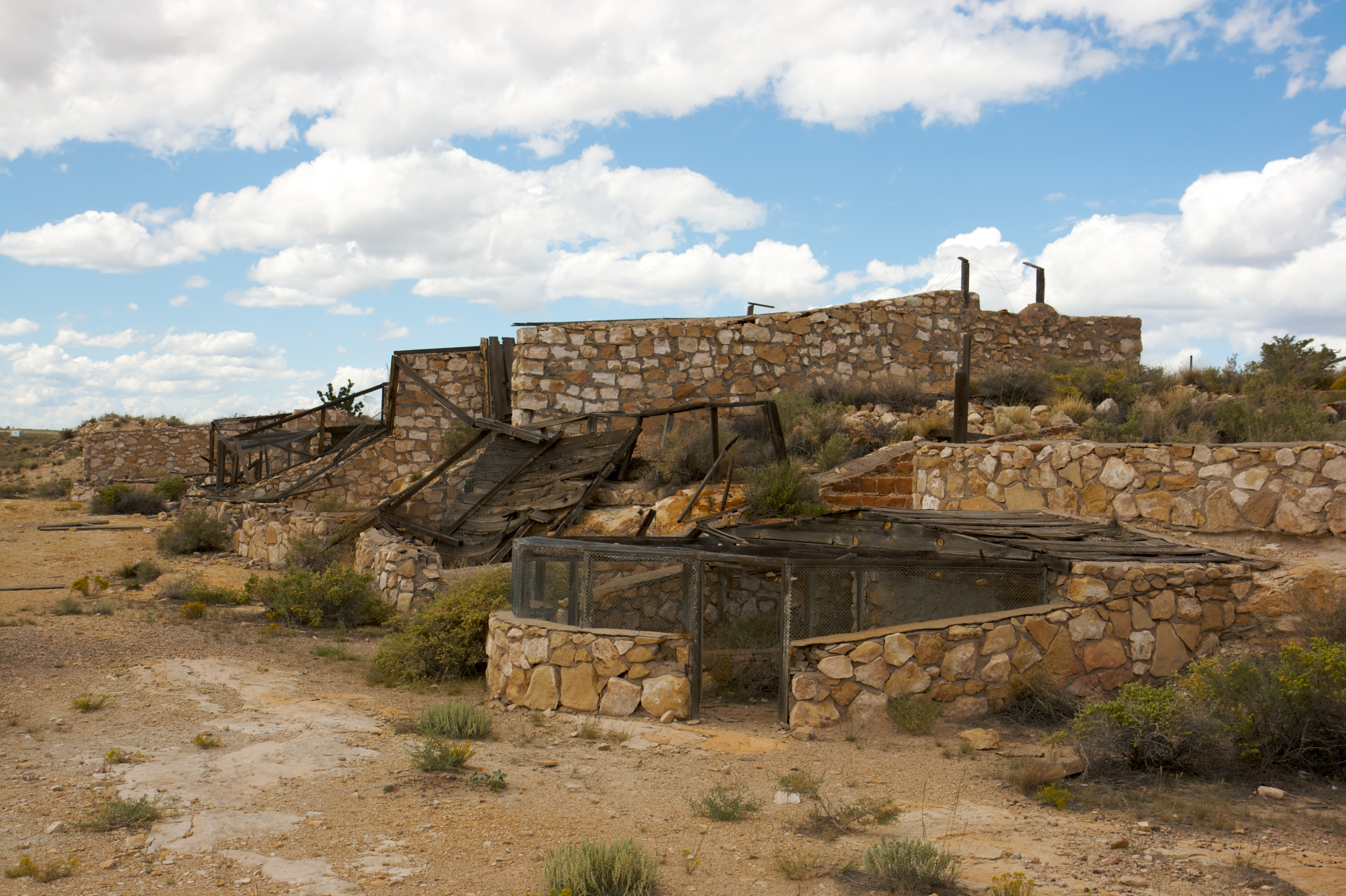
The abandoned zoo ruins at the Two Guns ghost town along former US 66

As I-40 replaced US 66, the old highway's popularity greatly declined. Business along the route began declining as fewer and fewer people drove through the old towns. Slowly, many towns declined or were outright abandoned and became ghost towns, including tourist towns like Two Guns. Many residents of the declining US 66 towns described the loss of business being instantaneous, happening right after the bypasses opened. The Interstate bypasses also meant the end of US 66 as an active highway, in conjunction with California concurrently removing its section of US 66 from the state highway system between 1964 and 1974, which moved the western terminus of the entire highway to the Colorado River in Topock, Arizona. The same year, US 66 was also truncated in the east from Chicago to Joplin, Missouri.

Despite California's lack of recognition of US 66 as an active highway, the American Association of State Highway and Transportation Officials (AASHTO) recognized the new western terminus of the highway at US 95 in Needles, across the river from Topock. The section of US 66 through Arizona remained unaltered until 1979, when AASHTO approved a request from California and Arizona to truncate US 66 from Needles to a junction with I-40 and US 666 in Sanders. However, the Arizona Department of Transportation (ADOT) continued to recognize the US 66 designation west of Sanders, establishing a signed western terminus at I-40 in Kingman.

Following the completion of the Williams bypass in 1984, ADOT approved a plan to deal with the remains of the highway in Arizona. All of US 66 in Arizona was no longer recognized as an active U.S. Highway. The sections of US 66 that were not concurrent with I-40 were re-designated as multiple Business Loops of I-40 and the section of highway from Kingman to Seligman was re-designated State Route 66. The section from Seligman to Crookton was abandoned to Yavapai County. On June 26, 1985, AASHTO approved a request by the states of Arizona, New Mexico, Texas, Oklahoma, Kansas and Missouri to retire the US 66 designation from the U.S. Highway System.

=== Historic Route 66 ===
Historic Route 66
- Location: Mohave, Coconino, Yavapai, Navajo, and Apache counties
- Length: 204.14 mi (328.53 km)
- Existed: 1987–present

A map of Historic Route 66. All signed or designated segments are highlighted in brown.

A Seligman-based small business owner named Angel Delgadillo had observed the impact that the decline of US 66 and establishment of the I-40 bypass had on his town. Delgadillo, a Seligman native, had been operating his privately owned barbershop since 1950. When I-40 had been completed around Seligman, the number of cars traveling through Seligman substantially decreased from thousands per day to only a handful per day. This also meant a great decrease in Delgadillo's business. By 1986, Delgadillo had been attempting for years to get former US 66 in Arizona designated as a historic route with little to no success. The same year, the Atchison, Topeka and Santa Fe Railway ended employee layovers in Seligman, decreasing Delgadillo's business even further.

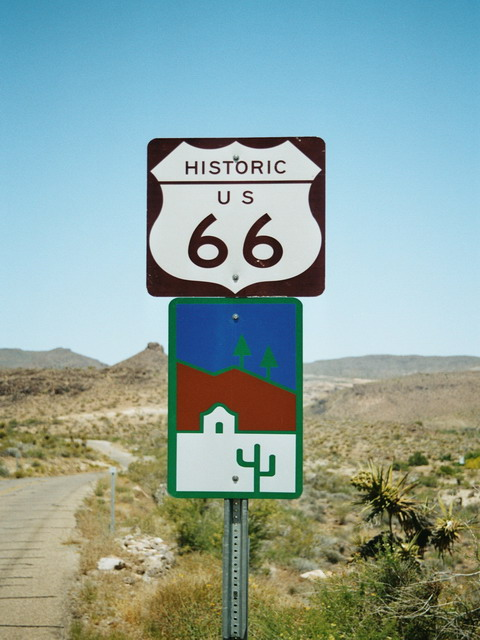
Field example of an ADOT Historic Route 66 sign and State Scenic Road marker in Mohave County

On February 18, 1987, Delgadillo organized a meeting of 15 small business owners with establishments along old US 66. Among the attendees was Delagdillo's older brother, Juan Delgadillo, who owned Delgadillo's Snow Cap Drive-In just down the street from Angel's barber shop. The businessmen met at the Copper Cart Canyon restaurant in downtown Seligman and agreed to form the Historic Route 66 Association of Arizona. The new association began lobbying and meeting with state level politicians as well as multiple chambers of commerce for support. Delgadillo even began selling US 66 themed merchandise at his barber shop to gather further support. The efforts of the new association paid off in November 1987, when the Arizona State Transportation Board designated several sections of old US 66 as Historic Route 66. The victory was marked by a ceremonial ribbon cutting for the new historic route in Seligman on April 23, 1988. This event was also the beginning of the first annual Route 66 Fun Run, an event where historic cars drive together down Historic Route 66 from Seligman to Kingman. The success of Historic Route 66 made Angel Delgadillo a popular figure among Route 66 enthusiasts around the world. Delgadillo has since been hailed as the "Guardian Angel of Route 66" and "Mayor of the Mother Road", among other nicknames.

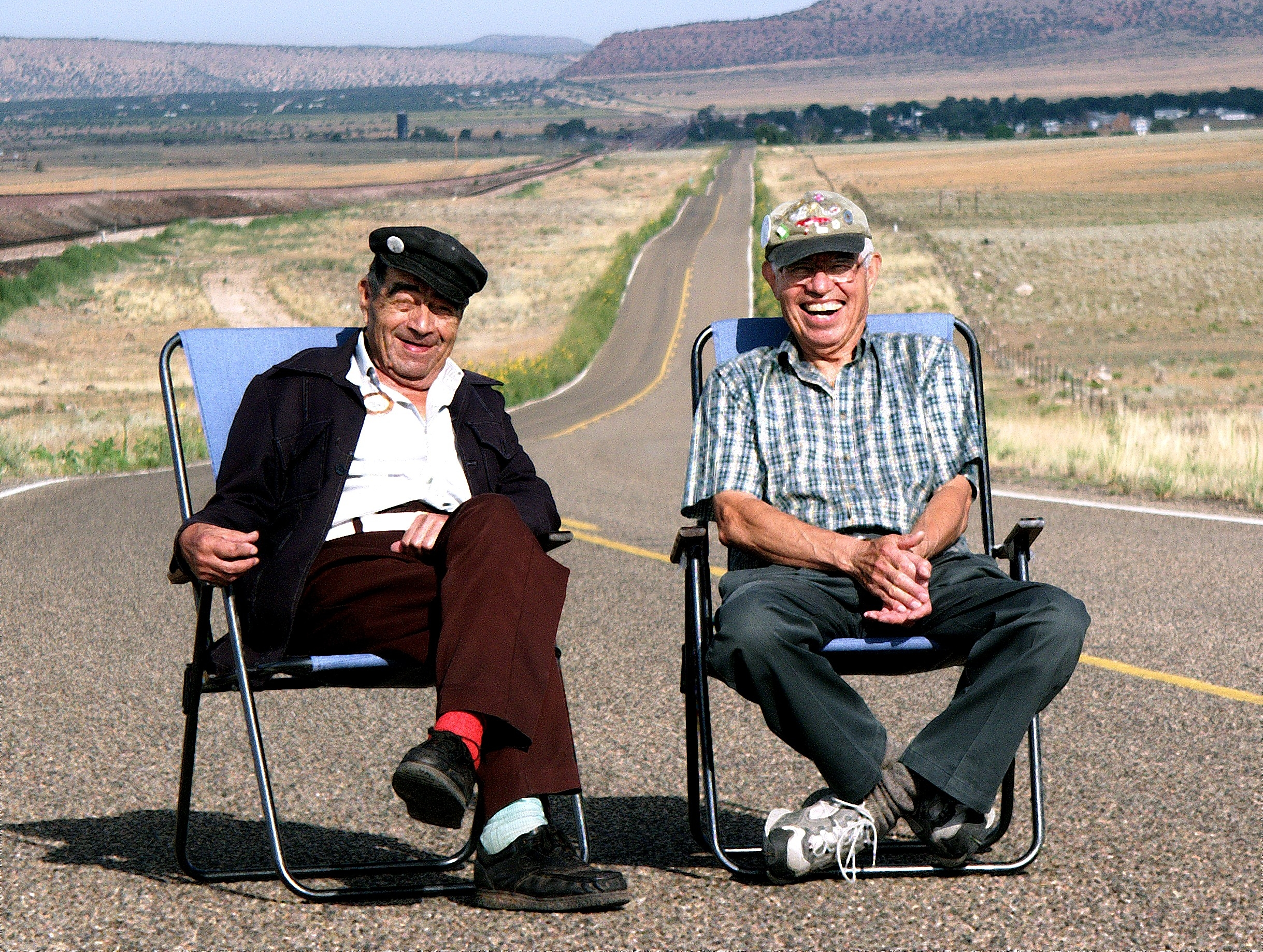
Angel Delgadillo and his brother Juan Delgadillo sitting on old US 66 near Seligman

The ADOT Parkways, Historic and Scenic Roads program continues to recognize certain sections of former US 66 as Historic Route 66. The longest sections of the designated historic route follow the original US 66 between Topock and Seligman through Oatman and from Flagstaff to Winona. Other smaller sections of Historic Route 66 comprise former US 66 segments that are currently or were once designated as I-40 Business. This is the case in Ash Fork, Williams, Winslow and Holbrook. Flagstaff is the only city in Arizona where the Historic Route splits into two alignments, the first along the aforementioned route to Winona and the second taking a small section of later US 66 to a junction with I-40 immediately east of Flagstaff. The discontinuous sections of Historic Route 66 are all connected by I-40. As there are no designated sections between Holbrook and New Mexico, the Arizona historic route officially has its eastern terminus in Holbrook.

Former US 66 sections are designated as the Historic Route 66 National Scenic Byway. The designation means the old highway is protected and preserved as both a National Scenic Byway and All-American Road under the supervision of the Federal Highway Administration. A museum is also dedicated to Historic Route 66 at the Powerhouse Visitor Center in Kingman. A further byway designation was granted to the original section of US 66 through Oatman, designated the Route 66 Historic Back Country Byway by the Bureau of Land Management as part of the BLM's Back Country Byways system. The overall length of all combined sections of Historic Route 66 is 204.14 miles (328.53 km). Until the addition of Historic U.S. Route 80 in 2018, Historic Route 66 was the only route in the Parkways, Historic and Scenic Roads program to span multiple counties, and was the longest state-designated historic route in Arizona. Similar to US 66, US 80 was once a heavily traveled transcontinental U.S. Highway with an iconic car culture until Interstates bypassed and replaced it. Historic Route 66 is one of Arizona's four state designated Historic Routes, with the others being Historic US 80, the Jerome–Clarkdale–Cottonwood Historic Road (Historic US 89A) and the Apache Trail Historic Road.

== Major intersections ==
This list follows the final non-freeway alignment in 1960.

County	Location	mi	km	Destinations	Notes
Colorado River		0.00	0.00	US 66 west – Los Angeles	California state line
Colorado River		0.00	0.00	Red Rock Bridge	
Mohave	Topock	0.19	0.31	Oatman Highway – Oatman	Pre-1952 US 66 east
Mohave	McConnico	45.05	72.50	Oatman Highway – Oatman	Pre-1952 US 66 west
Mohave	Kingman	49.37	79.45	US 93 north / US 466 west to SR 68 west – Las Vegas, Bullhead City	Southern terminus of US 93; eastern terminus of US 466
Mohave	Kingman	51.71	83.22	SR 93 south (Louise Avenue) – Wickenburg, Phoenix	Northern terminus of SR 93
Coconino	No major junctions				
Yavapai	No major junctions				
Coconino	No major junctions				
Yavapai	Ash Fork	161.37	259.70	US 89 south – Prescott	Western end of US 89 overlap; now SR 89
Coconino	Williams	180.81– 181.03	290.99– 291.34	SR 64 east – Grand Canyon	Western terminus of SR 64
Coconino	Flagstaff	210.30	338.45	US 89A south (Milton Road) – Sedona, Phoenix	Northern terminus of US 89A; former SR 79 south
Coconino	Flagstaff	210.94	339.48	SR 164 west (Humphreys Street) – Grand Canyon	Western terminus of SR 164; now US 180
Coconino	Flagstaff	214.73	345.57	US 89 north – Page	Eastern end of US 89 overlap; Pre-1947 US 66 east
Coconino	Flagstaff	219.59	353.40	SR 166 south – Walnut Canyon National Monument	Northern terminus of SR 166
Coconino	Winona	225.73	363.28	Townsend-Winona Road	Pre-1947 US 66 west
Navajo	Winslow	268.42	431.98	SR 65 south (Williamson Avenue) – Payson	Western end of SR 65 overlap; now SR 87
Navajo		275.41	443.23	SR 65 north – Second Mesa	Eastern end of SR 65 overlap; now SR 87
Navajo	Holbrook	301.37	485.01	US 260 east (Navajo Boulevard) to SR 77 south – Show Low, St. Johns, Petrified Forest National Park	Western terminus of US 260; now US 180 east and SR 77 south
Apache		325.18	523.33	Petrified Forest National Park	former SR 63 south
Apache	Sanders	354.56	570.61	US 666 south / SR 789 south – St. Johns	Western end of US 666 and SR 789 overlap; now US 191 south
Apache		374.71	603.04	US 66 east / US 666 north / NM 789 north – Albuquerque	New Mexico state line
1.000 mi = 1.609 km; 1.000 km = 0.621 mi: Concurrency terminus

== Structures ==
=== Buildings ===
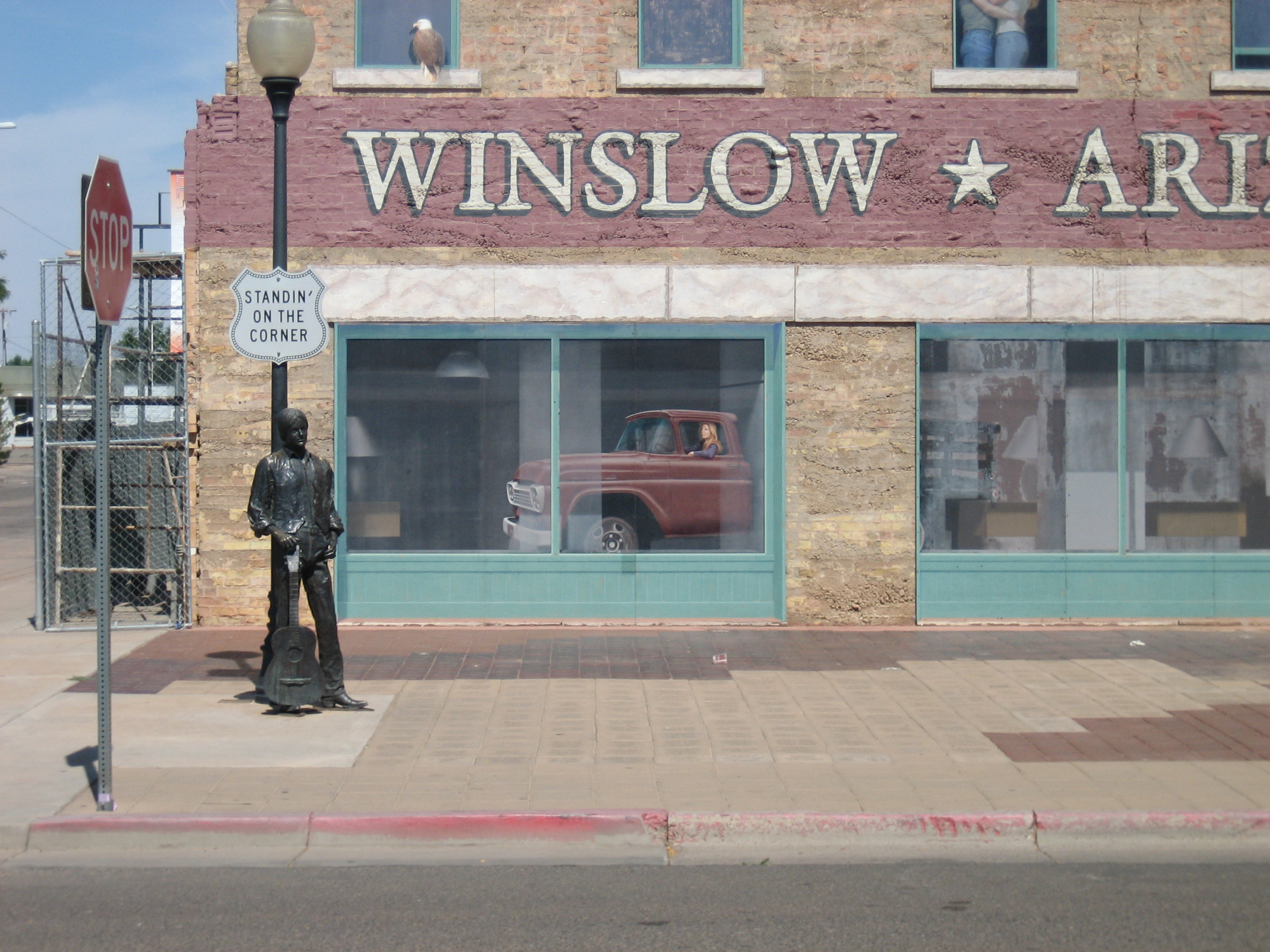
Standin' on the Corner Park in Winslow

A Desert Power & Water Co., Electric Power Plant built in 1908 closed in 1938, soon after the Hoover Dam was completed; it now houses a visitor information office, Route 66 Museum and gift shop.

The Schoolhouse at Truxton Canyon Training School in Valentine operated from 1903 to 1937 as a mandatory boarding school in which Hualapai were separated from their families and put to work learning various trades. Long a symbol of forced assimilation, the historic building is now the property of the Hualapai Nation.

The Peach Springs Trading Post, constructed in 1928 using local stone and logs, replaced an earlier 1917 trading post at Peach Springs. Its original role was to trade native crafts for foodstuffs, medicine and household goods. The building now houses Hualapai conservation offices.

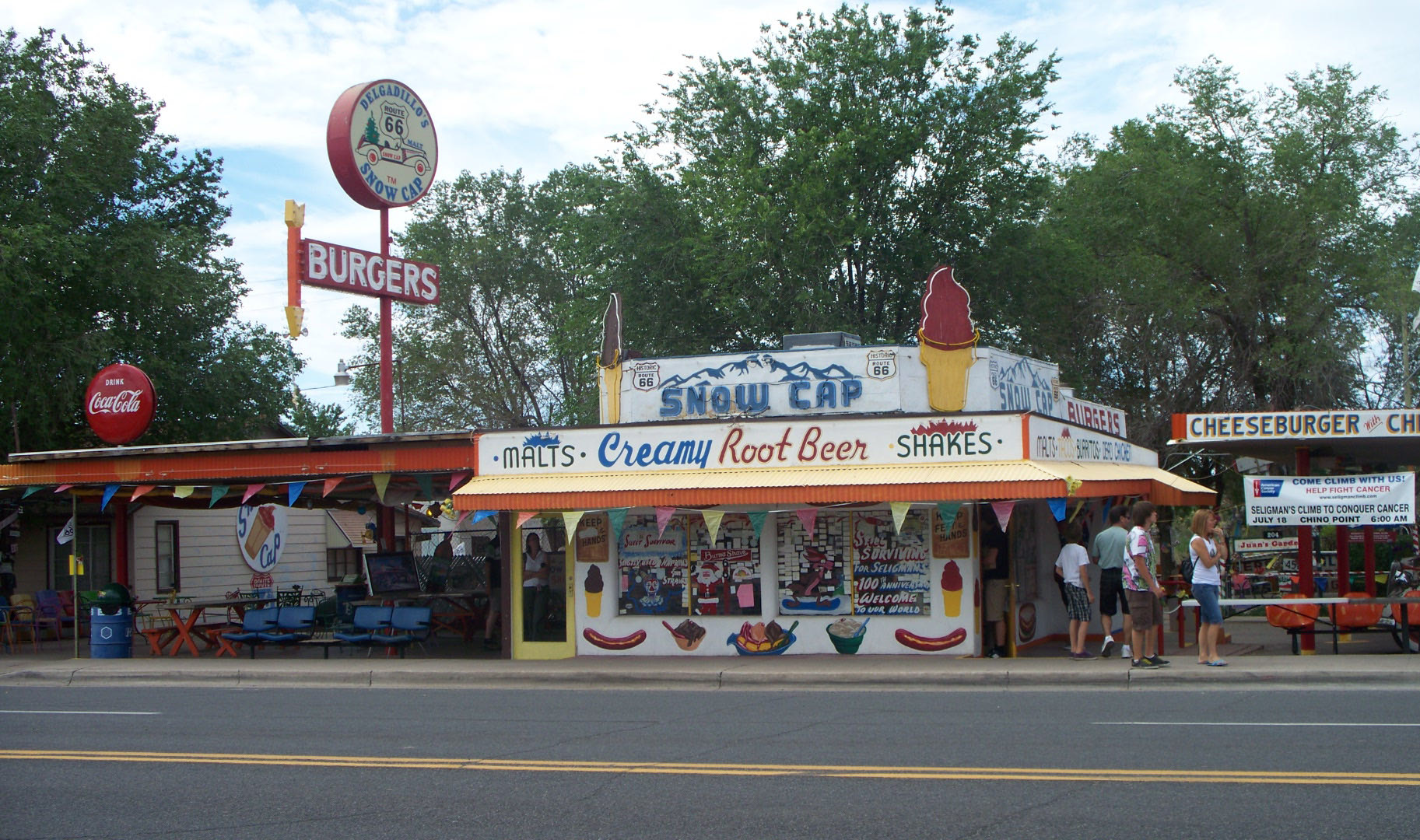
Delgadillo's Snow Cap Drive-In in Seligman

Lowell Observatory, an astronomical observatory established in Flagstaff in 1894, is one of the oldest observatories in the United States and a designated National Historic Landmark. The observatory is well known for being the location where astronomer Clyde Tombaugh discovered the dwarf planet Pluto on February 18, 1930.

Flagstaff's Santa Fe Railway Depot, built in 1926, is currently an Amtrak station and includes a visitor information office. Flagstaff's 43-room Hotel Monte Vista was established in 1927 and is believed to be a filming location for the 1942 film Casablanca, starring actor Humphrey Bogart.

=== Historic districts ===
- Kingman Commercial Historic District, Kingman
- Seligman Historic District, Seligman
- Railroad Addition Historic District, Flagstaff
- La Posada Historic District in Winslow, which dates from 1930, includes the Winslow Santa Fe station as well as La Posada Hotel and Gardens, a Fred Harvey Company hotel.

=== Restaurants ===
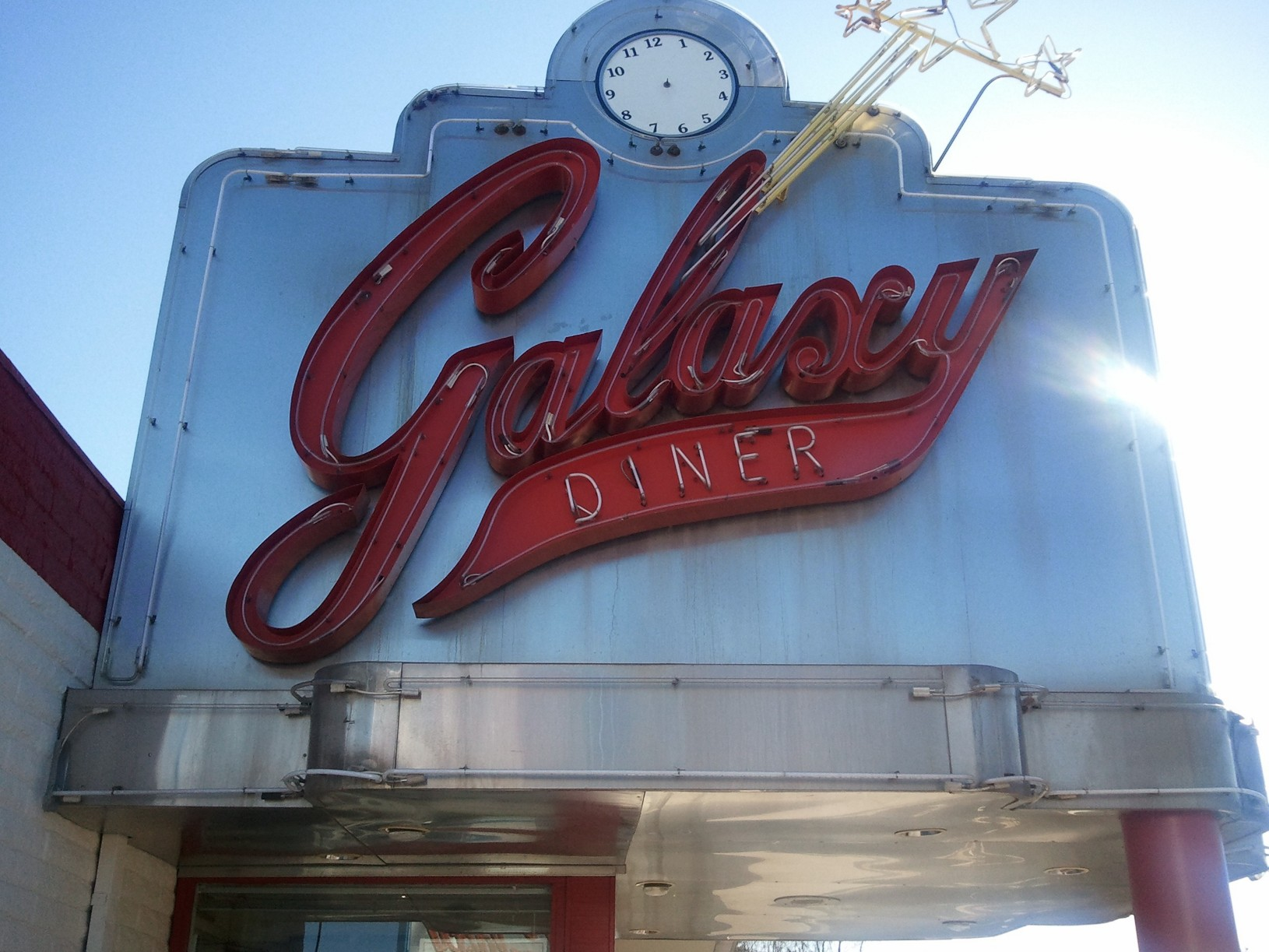
National Archive image of Historic Route 66 Galaxy Diner, Flagstaff

Delgadillo's Snow Cap Drive-In in Seligman, was built in 1953 with scrap railway lumber by Juan Delgadillo. Following Delgadillo's passing in 2004, his children took over ownership and operation of the restaurant. It continues to offer choices such as a "cheeseburger with cheese" and "dead chicken."

The Galaxy Diner along the route in Flagstaff is a popular fixture. It had opened in the 1950s and retained the small-town diner iconography despite popular franchises replacing many restaurants; it was refitted to better emulate its original era in the 1990s. The diner closed on August 2, 2019, then re-opened under new ownership in August 2020.

=== Camps, motor courts, and motels ===
The Oatman Hotel, a historic two-story adobe building which opened in 1902 as the Durlin Hotel and was rebuilt in 1924 during a local gold rush now houses a bar, restaurant and museum.

The Wigwam Village Motel in Holbrook is distinctive for patented novelty architecture in which every room of the motel is a free-standing concrete wigwam. In Disney/Pixar's animated film franchise Cars, these are depicted as the traffic cones of the Cozy Cone Motel.

The Pueblo Revival style Painted Desert Inn in Navajo, constructed circa-1920 of wood and native stone, and purchased by the US National Park Service in 1935, is situated on a mesa overlooking the vast Painted Desert.

About 20 miles (32 km) from Kingman in Antares, Arizona is the Kozy Corner RV park, which features the 'Giganticus Headicus' attraction, a 14-foot tall homemade monument resembling the Easter Island heads. The park is on Antares Point, the longest continuous curve (c. 2 miles) of any United States highway. The RV park is isolated, bracketed between the Peacock Mountains and Route 66 and the Burlington Northern & Santa Fe Railway, which run parallel; it began as a camp for railroad workers in the early 1900s. A local legend claims that Gene Roddenberry stayed at the motel and named the Antares ship in Star Trek after its location.

=== Bridges ===
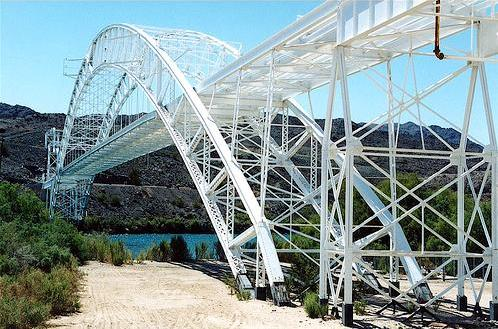
Trails Arch Bridge in Topock

- Old Trails Bridge, Topock
- Walnut Canyon Bridge, Winona
- Canyon Diablo Bridge, Two Guns
- Querino Canyon Bridge, Houck

=== Road segments ===
- Various segments of old US 66 throughout Arizona, in various states of preservation, are listed on the National Register of Historic Places.

== See also ==
- Keyhole Sink
- U.S. Route 80 in Arizona
- U.S. Route 180

U.S. Route 66
Previous state: California	Arizona	Next state: New Mexico

National Old Trails Road
Previous state: California	Arizona	Next state: New Mexico
