= Lupton, Arizona =

CDP in Apache County, Arizona

Lupton, Arizona Tsé Siʼání (Navajo)
- Census-designated place
- Location of Lupton in Apache County, Arizona.

- Location within Arizona
- Coordinates: 35°21′17″N 109°03′10″W
- Country: United States
- State: Arizona
- County: Apache

Area
  - Total: 0.35 sq mi (0.90 km^{2})
  - Land: 0.35 sq mi (0.90 km^{2})
  - Water: 0 sq mi (0.00 km^{2})
- Elevation: 6,188 ft (1,886 m)

Population (2020)
  - Total: 19
  - Density: 54.6/sq mi (21.07/km^{2})
- Time zone: UTC-7 (Mountain (MST))
- ZIP code: 86508
- Area code: 928
- GNIS feature ID: 2582818

Lupton (Navajo: Tsé Siʼání) is an unincorporated community and census-designated place (CDP) in Apache County, Arizona, United States. Lupton is located along Interstate 40 at the New Mexico border, 21 miles (34 km) southwest of Gallup, New Mexico. Lupton has a post office with ZIP code 86508. As of the 2020 census, the Lupton CDP had a population of 19.

== History ==
Lupton was established in 1905 by trainmaster G. W. Lupton. Col. John Washington passed by here in his 1864 Navajo Campaign.

== Demographics ==
Historical population
Census	Pop.	Note	%±
2010	25		—
2020	19		−24.0%
U.S. Decennial Census

== Education ==
It is in the Sanders Unified School District.
