= Bob Waldmire =

American artist (1945–2009)

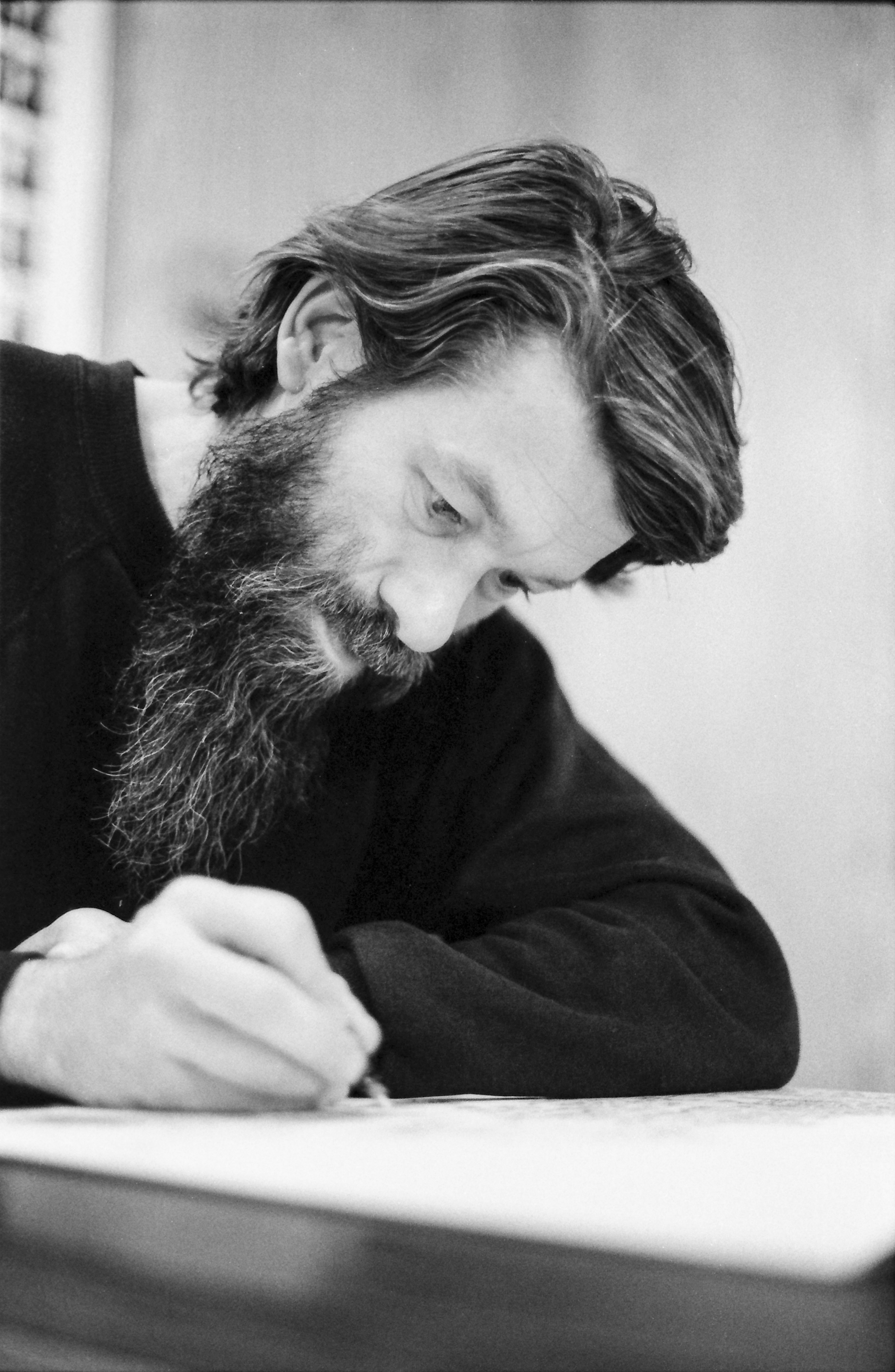
Waldmire drawing a campus map for Bradley University at the AEPi fraternity house

Robert Waldmire (April 19, 1945 – December 16, 2009) was an American artist and cartographer who is well known for his artwork of U.S. Route 66, including whimsical maps of the Mother Road and its human and natural ecology. Being the son of Ed Waldmire Jr., he is often associated with the Cozy Dog Drive-In restaurant in Springfield, Illinois (on U.S. Route 66). The elder Waldmire (along with his friend Don Strand) created the Cozy Dog.

== Biography ==
Waldmire was born in St. Louis, Missouri and had a brother, Buz Waldmire. His career as a professional artist began during his student days at Southern Illinois University. He returned home to draft a "bird's-eye view" poster of his hometown. Merchants paid to include their businesses in the posters, which he could then sell in the merchant's place of business at a profit. He extended the idea to 34 cities, then turned his attention to the promotion of historic U.S. Route 66.

Waldmire was a "snowbird", spending his winter months in Arizona's Chiricahua Mountains in a self-sufficient home of his own design. During the summer, he traveled the country, but based himself in his native Central Illinois, living in a converted Chevrolet school bus near Springfield.

Waldmire was an ethical vegetarian.

== U.S. Route 66 ==
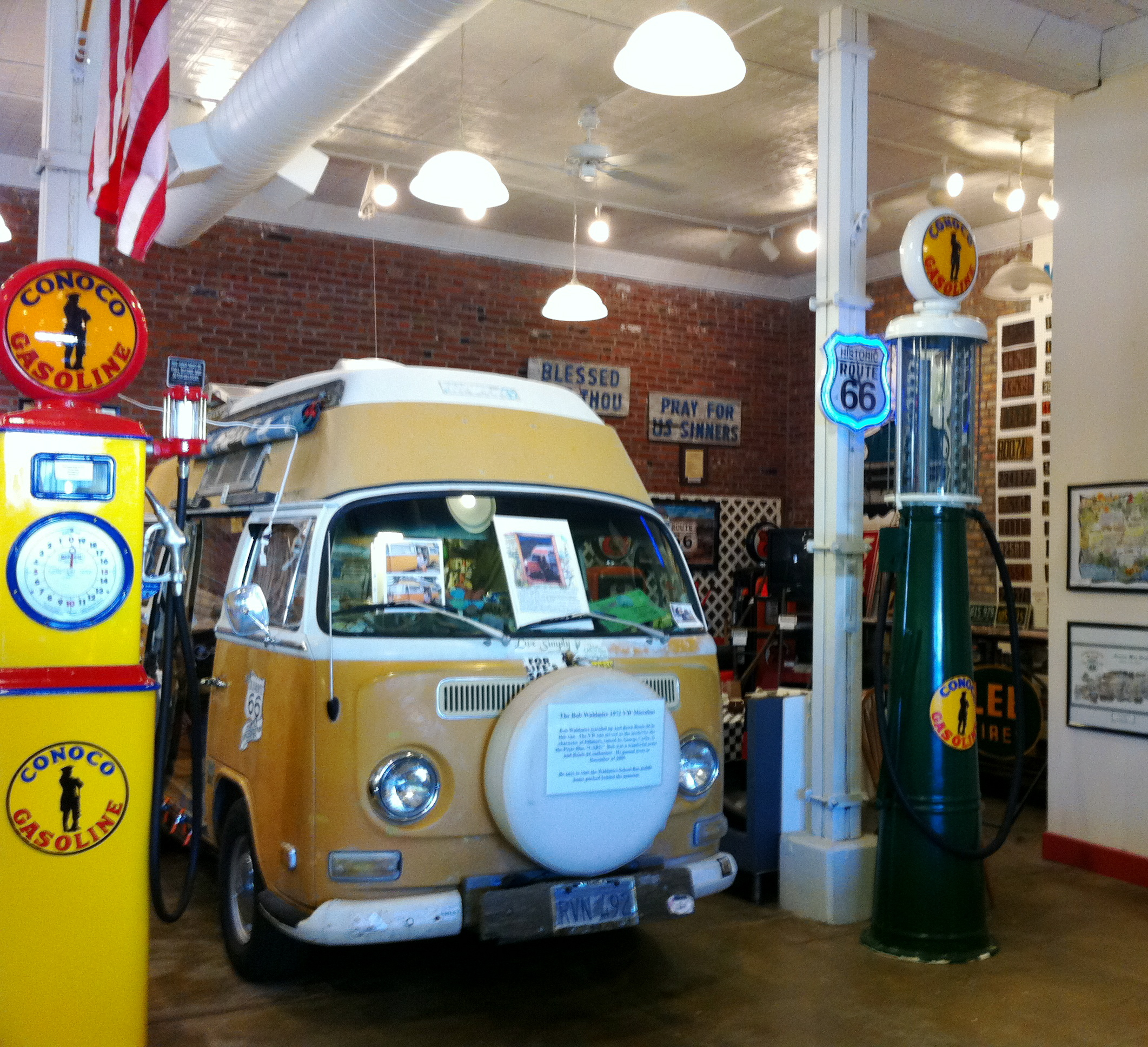
Waldmire's van in Route 66 Hall of Fame

In 1992, Waldmire re-opened the Hackberry General Store in the ghost town of Hackberry, Arizona, as a Route 66 tourism information post and souvenir shop. The 1934 store, originally the Northside Grocery and Conoco station, had been closed and vacant since 1978 after Interstate 40 in Arizona bypassed the town (on 66) and left it stranded fifteen miles away from the very different route taken by I-40.

Waldmire sold the store to John and Kerry Pritchard in 1998 due to local disputes regarding the environmental and aesthetic impact of quarries removing local stone for use in landscaping.

In 2004, Waldmire earned the National Historic Route 66 Federation's John Steinbeck Award for his contributions to the preservation of Route 66.

One of Waldmire's modified vehicles, an orange 1972 Volkswagen Microbus, was the inspiration for the character "Fillmore" from the 2006 animated motion picture Cars. Pixar abandoned a proposal to name the character "Waldmire" as Waldmire was unwilling to sell marketing rights to Disney for a series of toys which would appear in McDonald's Happy Meals.

On November 22, 2009, "Bob's Last Art Show" was held at the Cozy Dog Drive-In. On December 16, 2009, Waldmire died from cancer, which had spread from his colon to his liver. His ashes were returned to the earth at multiple sites, including his parents' gravesite in Mottarville Cemetery near Rochester, Illinois, both U.S. Route 66 endpoints and other pre-selected US 66 locations including his longtime Arizona winter home.

His official website, bobwaldmire.com, remains in operation as of 2026 and is maintained by his brother, Buz Waldmire. His trademark van and bus are now displayed in the Route 66 Hall of Fame and Museum in Pontiac, Illinois.

=== Jay Crim interview ===
An interview published by Jay Crim on YouTube in 2013 details aspects of his life in relation to Route 66 through a series of questions. He described his involvement with Route 66, what he found most interesting, his role as an artist, and what he chose to emphasize in his artwork.

Waldmire grew up on Route 66 but did not find a connection to it until he drove on the road from Arizona to Illinois in the fall of 1987. He took it as a detour after encountering a traffic-dense interstate and figured the frontage road would be less impacted. He found it fascinating to drive down a piece of 66 and started wondering how many pieces he could cover as he made his way to Illinois. As a traveling map-making artist, he thought of the idea to draw a map of old Route 66 because he was inspired by his trip. This jump started his involvement with 66 as an artist which lined up with what he refers to as the "revival" of Route 66. Waldmire had an initial exposure to Route 66 because his dad built his main restaurant on the south edge of Springfield which was close to 66. He recalls having fond memories of being excited to see unannounced buses pulling into the lot. He detailed the rush that would go on in the kitchen as they drew up drinks ahead of time, loaded the grill with hamburgers, and filled the fryers with racks of cozy dogs and baskets of French fries. Even as a child he was enticed to see exotic license plates from Oklahoma or Texas. After traveling west on a family vacation, he found a gravitation toward the southwest. He started taking Route 66 throughout his travels from home to locations in the west.

Waldmire detailed his nostalgia for Route 66 and expressed his appreciation for old items from the past that have not yet been destroyed or painted over. He self-identified as a preservationist and environmentalist who had a hard time comprehending modern progress. He would elaborate on this note by explaining his interest for preserving locations, species, and nature itself. Progress to him did not include developing and bulldozing over areas that have a rich history.

His road as an artist started as he made flyers for Route 66 and passed them out to neighboring businesses to promote the history. He met with people along the road who were trying to establish the historical significance of Route 66, which is what he refers to as the “revival.” He had his own version of restoration that he pursued throughout his travels on Route 66. His main concern was the preservation of nature, which is why he enjoyed 66 since it was an experience of being one with nature. There was a sense of connection to this nature where people could stop and enjoy the location, rather than being on an interstate.

His artwork weaves together nature, with landscape and geological features into his pieces. He made it a point to himself to include details of any history that he covered along with certain plants and animals that pertained to that location. Additionally, as his audience grew larger, his objective was to produce a diversification of cars that he was representing in his art on Route 66. He wanted to spread the message to those purchasing his art to stop and enjoy nature on the way from different points throughout 66.
