= Valentine, Arizona =

Unincorporated community in the state of Arizona, United States

- Census-designated place
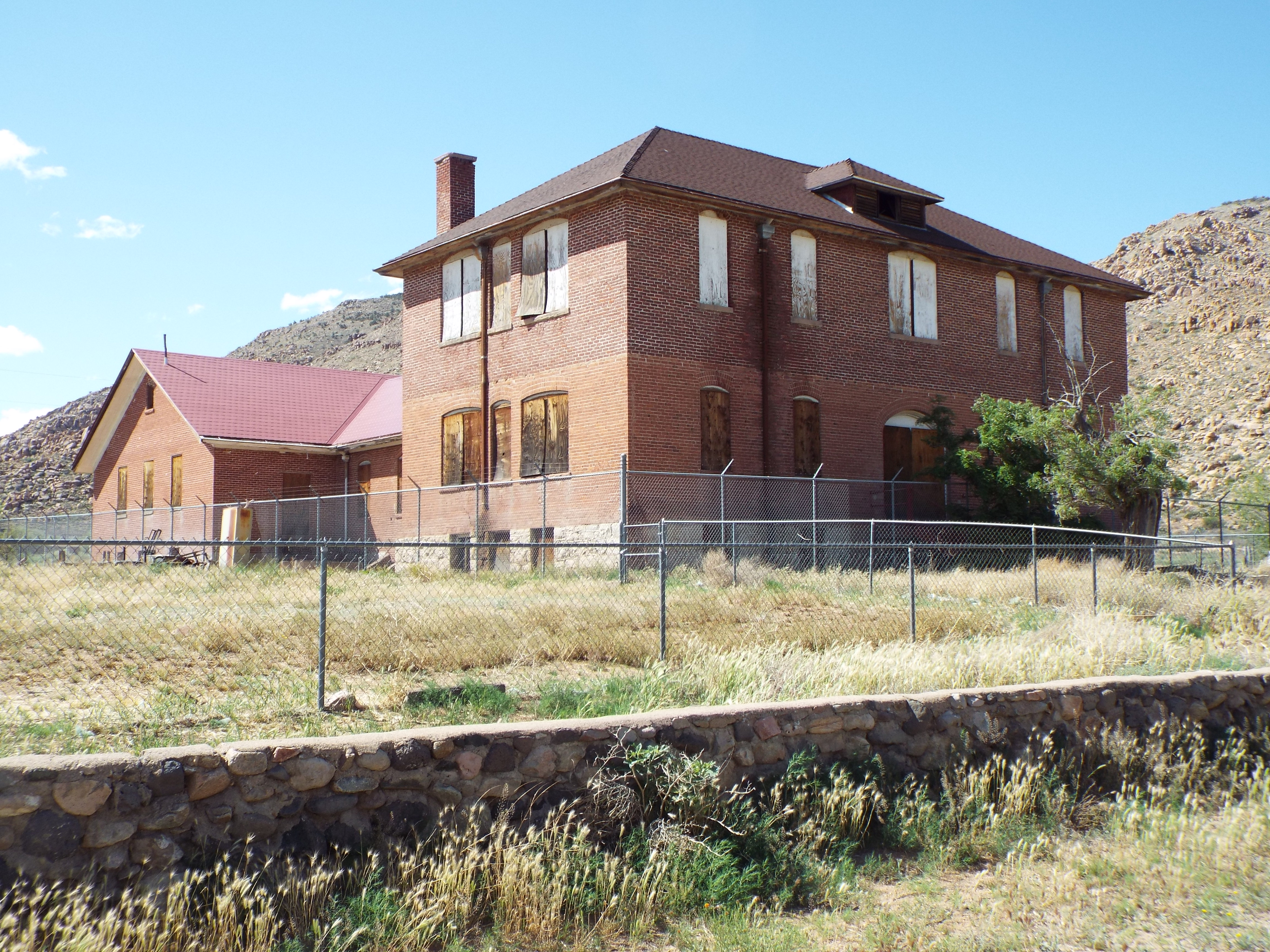
- 1903 Truxton Canon Training School listed in the NRHP

- Location in Mohave County, Arizona

- Location within Arizona Location within the United States
- Coordinates: 35°22′48″N 113°39′41″W
- Country: United States
- State: Arizona
- County: Mohave

Area
  - Total: 1.59 sq mi (4.13 km^{2})
  - Land: 1.59 sq mi (4.13 km^{2})
  - Water: 0 sq mi (0.00 km^{2})
- Elevation: 3,819 ft (1,164 m)

Population (2020)
  - Total: 39
  - Density: 24.4/sq mi (9.44/km^{2})
- Time zone: UTC-7 (Mountain (MST))
- ZIP code: 86437
- Area code: 928
- GNIS feature ID: 2582887
- FIPS code: 04-78820

Valentine is an unincorporated community and census-designated place (CDP) in Mohave County, Arizona, United States. As of the 2020 census it had a population of 39. Valentine is located on Arizona State Route 66 (former U.S. Route 66) 32 miles (51 km) northeast of Kingman. The majority of Valentine is located in a geographically isolated exclave of the Hualapai Reservation and the rest of the community is located in unincorporated Mohave County.

== Demographics ==
Historical population
Census	Pop.	Note	%±
2010	38		—
2020	39		2.6%
U.S. Decennial Census

== Education ==
The Valentine Elementary School District serves the communities of Valentine, Truxton, Crozier and a portion of Hackberry. It has its single K-8 school in Truxton. When the school was first established, it was in Valentine itself. The Valentine Campus was closed in 1969, and classes were moved to Truxton.

The Bureau of Indian Affairs operated the Truxton Canyon Training School in Valentine from 1903 to 1937. The BIA continues to have an office in Valentine.

== See also ==
- Media related to Valentine, Arizona at Wikimedia Commons
