= Hualapai =

Native American tribe

Hualapai Tribe
Hwalbáy (Walapai)
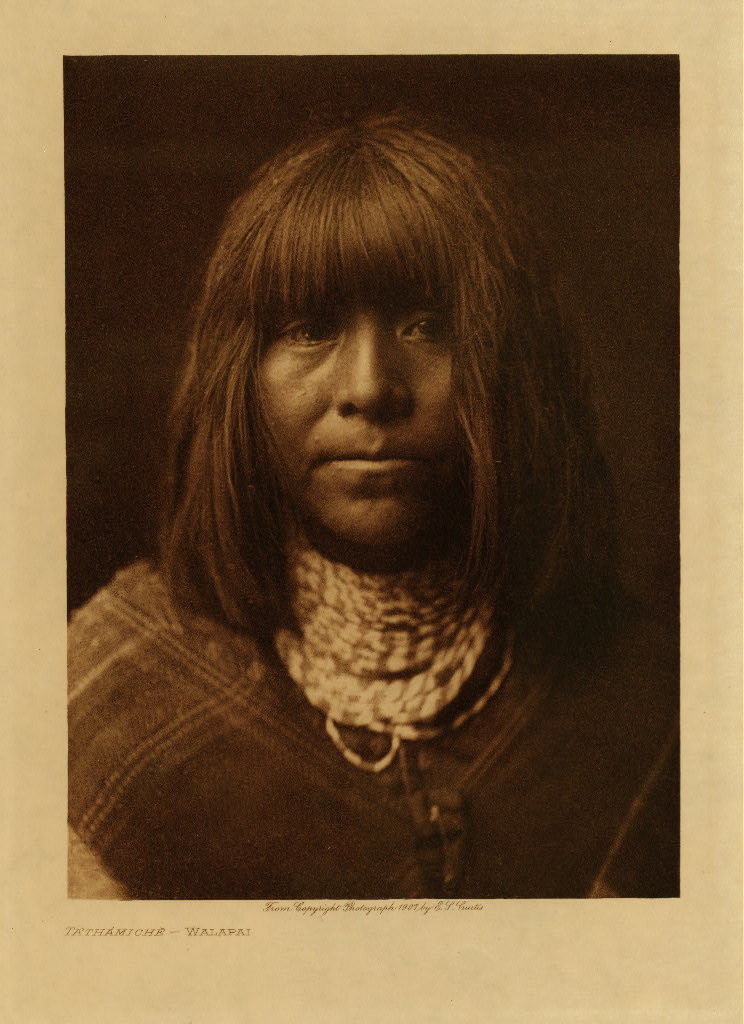
- Ta'thamiche, Hualapai 1907 photo by Edward Curtis

Total population
- 2,300 enrolled citizens

Regions with significant populations
- United States (Arizona)

Languages
- Hualapai, English

Religion
- Indigenous, Christianity

Related ethnic groups
- Mohave, Yavapai, Havasupai

The Hualapai (/ˈwɑːlɑːpaɪ/ WAH-lah-py, Walapai: Hwalbáy) are a federally recognized Native American tribe in Arizona with about 2300 enrolled citizens. Approximately 1353 enrolled citizens reside on the Hualapai Reservation, which spans over three counties in Northern Arizona (Coconino, Yavapai, and Mohave).

The name, meaning "people of the tall pines", is derived from hwa:l, the Hualapai word for ponderosa pine and pai "people". Their traditional territory is a 108-mile (174 km) stretch along the pine-clad southern side of the Grand Canyon and the Colorado River with the tribal capital at Peach Springs. Other communities on the reservation include Valentine and Grand Canyon West.

== Government ==
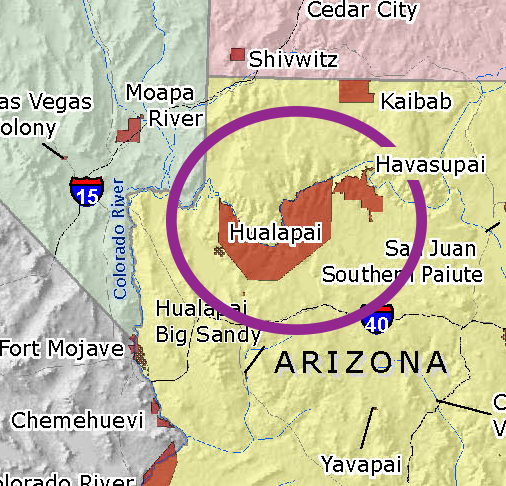
Hualapai Reservation shown in Northwestern Arizona

The Hualapai tribe is a sovereign nation and governed by an executive and judicial branch and a tribal council. The tribe provides a variety of social, cultural, educational and economic services to its citizens.

The Hualapai Nation Police Department provides Law Enforcement services to the People of the Hualapai Nation and its visitors and guests.

== Language ==
The Hualapai language is a Pai branch of the Yuman–Cochimí languages, also spoken by the closely related Havasupai, and more distantly to Yavapai people. It is spoken by most people over 30 on the Reservation as well as many young people. The Peach Springs School District runs a successful bilingual program for all local students, both Hualapai and non-Hualapai, in addition to immersion camps.

== Reservation ==
Location of the reservation within Arizona

The Hualapai Reservation (35°54′25″N 113°07′58″W), covering 1,142 square miles (2,960 km^{2}), was created by the presidential executive order of Chester A. Arthur on January 4, 1883. It is located in Coconino and Mohave counties. Its headquarter and most important community is Peach Springs.

== History and culture ==
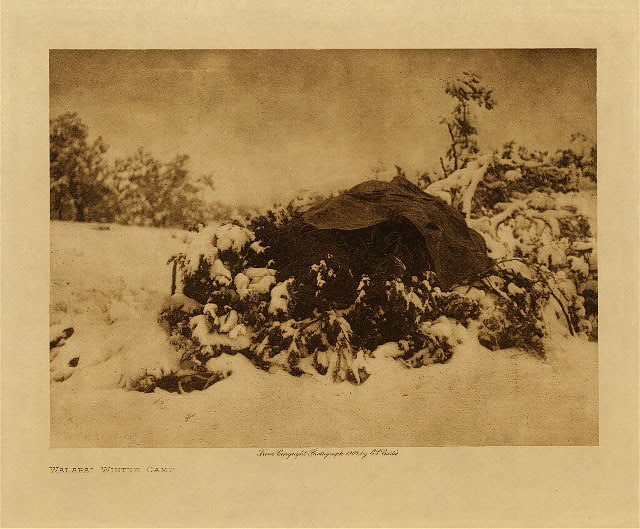
A Hualapai winter camp, photographed by Edward Curtis, 1907.

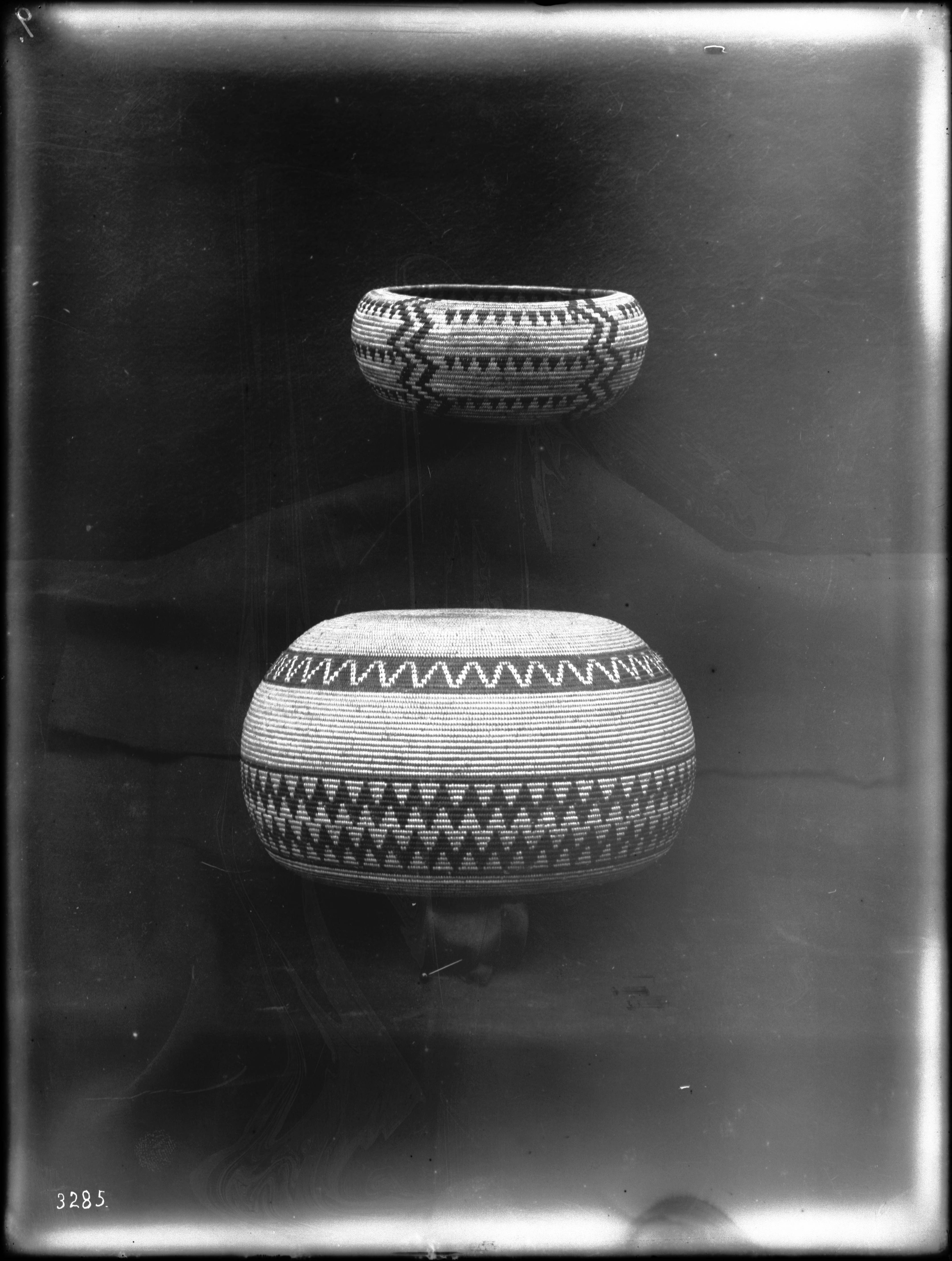
Two Hualapai baskets on display, c. 1900

=== Ceremonies ===
Major traditional ceremonies of the Hualapai include the "Maturity" ceremony and the "Mourning" ceremony. Nowadays the modern Sobriety Festival is also celebrated in June.

=== Afterlife ===
The souls of the dead are believed to go northwestward to a beautiful land where plentiful harvest grow. This land is believed to be seen only by Hualapai spirits.

=== Traditional dress ===
Traditional Hualapai dress consists of full suits of deerskin and rabbit skin robes.

=== Traditional housing ===
Conical houses formed from cedar boughs using the single slope form called a Wikiup.

=== Reservation life ===
The Hualapai Reservation was created by executive order in 1883 on lands that just four regional bands considered as part of their home range, like the Yi Kwat Pa'a (Iquad Ba:' – "Peach Springs band") or Ha'kasa Pa'a (Hak saha Ba:' – "Pine Springs band"). The other Hualapai regional bands (including the Havasupai) lived far away from the current reservation land.

=== Hualapai War ===
The Hualapai War (1865–1870) was caused by an increase in traffic through the area on the Fort Mojave-Prescott Toll Road which escalated tensions and produced armed conflicts between the Hualapai and European Americans. The war broke out in May 1865, when the Hualapai leader Anasa was killed by a man named Hundertinark in the area of Camp Willow Grove and in March 1866. In response, a man named Clower was killed by the Hualapai, who also closed the route from Prescott, Arizona, to the Colorado River ports due to the conflict. The most important and principal Hualapai leaders (called Tokoomhet or Tokumhet) at that time were: Wauba Yuba (Wauba Yuma of the Yavapai Fighters subtribe), Sherum (Shrum or Cherum of the Ha Emete Pa'a i.e. "Cerbat Mountain band" of the Middle Mountain People subtribe), Hitchi Hitchi (Hitchie-Hitchie of the Plateau People subtribe) and Susquatama (Sudjikwo'dime, better known by his nickname Hualapai Charley, Hualapai Charlie, Walapai Charley or Walapai Charlie of the Middle Mountain People subtribe). It was not until William Hardy and the Hualapai leaders negotiated a peace agreement at Beale Springs that the raids and the fighting subsided. However, the agreement lasted only nine months when it was broken with the murder of Chief Wauba Yuba near present-day Kingman during a dispute with the Walker Party over the treaty.

After the chief's murder, raids by the Hualapai began in full force on mining camps and settlers. The cavalry from Fort Mojave responded, with the assistance of the Mohave people, by attacking Hualapai rancherias and razing them. The pivotal engagement took place in January 1868, when Captain S.B.M. Young, later joined in by Lt. Johnathan D. Stevenson, surprised the rancheria of Sherum with his more than one hundred warriors. Known as the Battle of Cherum Peak, it lasted all day. Stevenson fell in the first volley. The Hualapai managed to escape, but lost twenty-one warriors, with many more wounded. The Battle broke the military resistance of the Hualapai. The Hualapai began to surrender, as whooping cough and dysentery weakened their ranks, on August 20, 1868. They were led by Chief Leve Leve (Levi-Levi, half-brother to Sherum and Hualapai Charley) of the Amat Whala Pa'a (Mad hwa:la Ba:' – "Hualapai Mountains band") of the Yavapai Fighters subtribe. The warrior Sherum, who was known for his tenacity as a warrior, later surrendered, thus marking the end of the Hualapai Wars in 1870. It is estimated that one-third of the Hualapai people were killed during this war either by the conflict or disease.

== Hualapai bands and villages ==
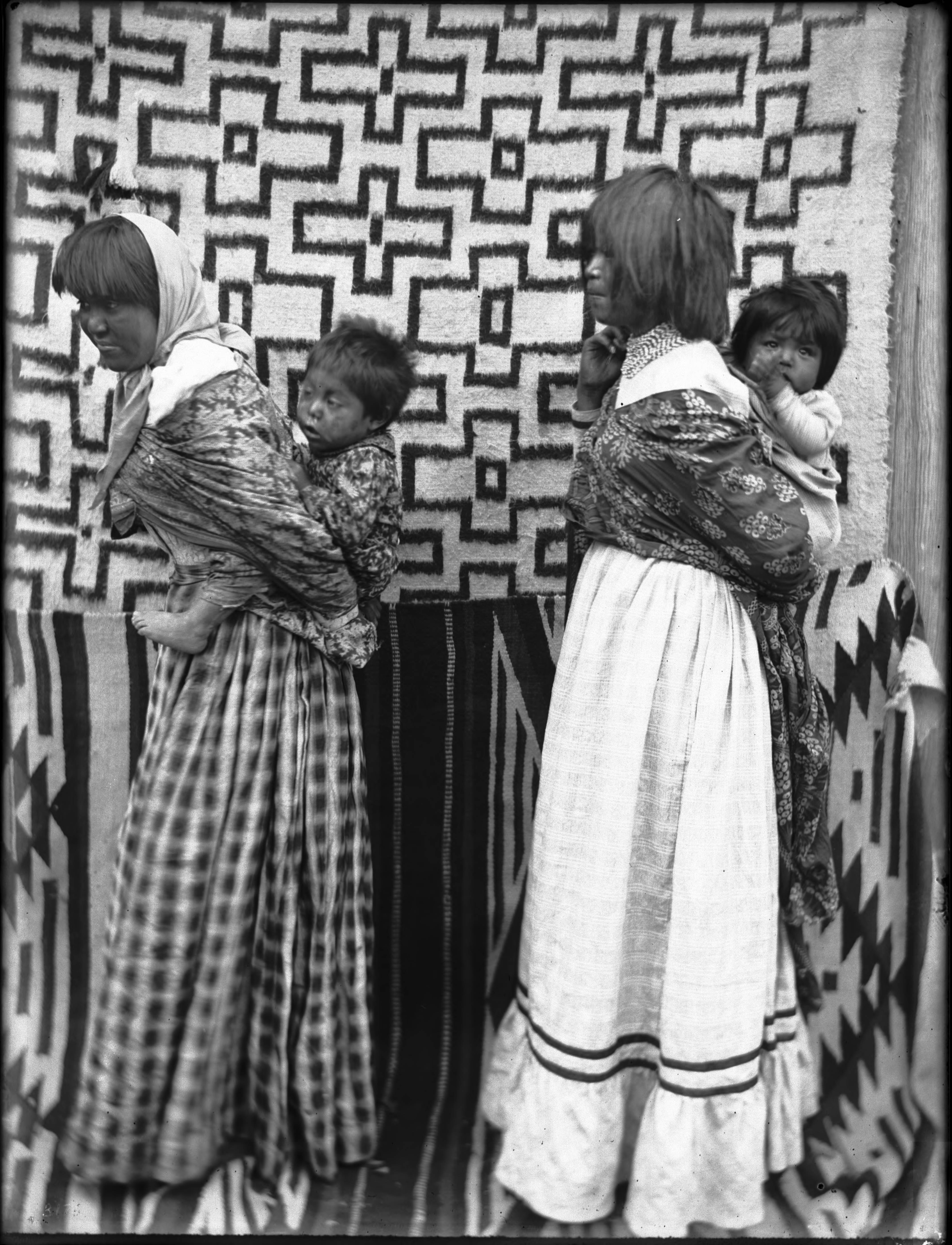
Two young Walapai Indian mothers with their children on their backs, Hackbury, Arizona, c. 1900

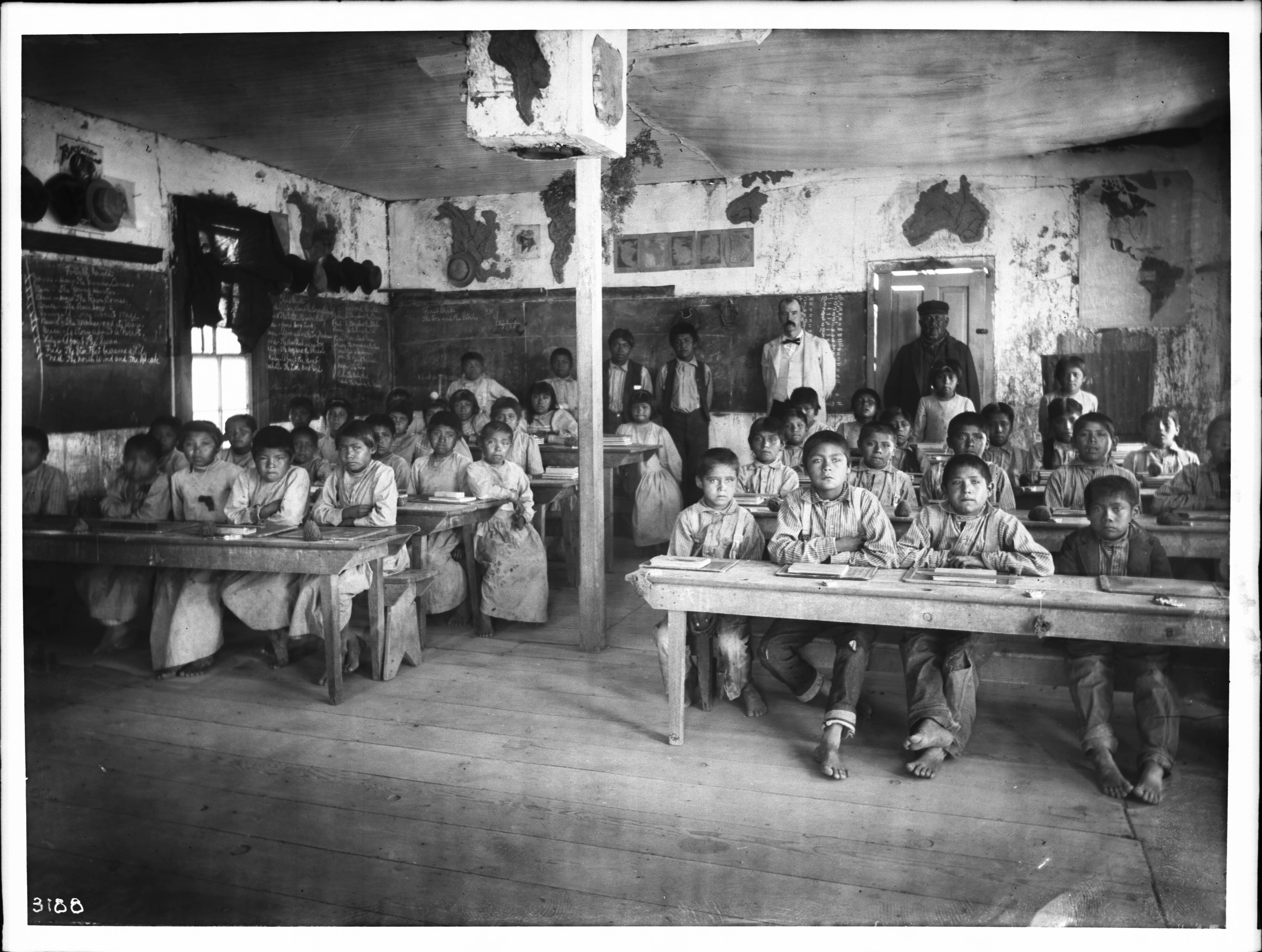
Segregated Walapai school, c. 1900.

Ethnically, the Havasupai and the Hualapai are one people, although today, they are politically separate groups as the result of U.S. government policy. The Hualapai (Pa'a or Pai) had three subtribes – the Middle Mountain People in the northwest, Plateau People in the east, and Yavapai Fighter in the south (McGuire; 1983). The subtribes were divided into seven bands (Kroeber; 1935, Manners; 1974), which themselves were broken up into thirteen (original fourteen) regional bands or local groups (Dobyns and Euler; 1970). The local groups were composed of several extended family groups, living in small villages: The Havasupai were one band of the Plateau People subtribe.

=== Plateau People ===
Ko'audva Kopaya ("The People Up Above") included seven bands in the plateau and canyon country mostly east of the Truxton Canyon Wash (with "Qwa'ga-we'/Hackberry Springs") and Grand Wash Cliffs, planted in Quartermaster Canyon (with "Metipka/Mati'bika Spring"), Meriwhitica Canyon (with "Meriwhitica Spring/Indian Gardens"), Milkweed Canyon (with "Hê'l/Milkweed Springs"), Spencer Canyon (with "Matawidita Spring"), Peach Springs Canyon (with "Yiga't/Lower Peach Springs" and "Hake-takwi'va/Peach Springs proper"), Diamond Creek Canyon (Gwada), Prospect Canyon, Mohawk Canyon, and National Canyon, they also occupied portion of the eastern Hualapai Valley and Peacock Mountains, the Music Mountains, this area include the current Hualapai Reservation, bands listed from west to east:

- Mata'va-kapai ("Northern People")
  - Ha Dooba Pa'a / Haduva Ba:' ("Clay Springs band", lived in the Grand Wash Cliffs, Music Mountains and Aquarius Cliffs, suffered heavy losses during the war.)
  - Tanyika Ha' Pa'a / Danyka Ba:' ("Grass Springs band", were largely able to stay away from the fighting.)

Villages (along the edge of the Grand Wash Cliffs): Hadū'ba/Ha'a Dooba ("Clay Springs"), Hai'ya, Hathekáva-kió, Hath'ela/Ha'thi-el ("[Salty] Spring"), Huwuskót, Kahwāga, Kwa'thekithe'i'ta, Metipka/Mati'bika, Oya'a Nisa ("spider cave"), Oya'a Kanyaja, Tanyika'/Danyka ("Grass Springs")

- Ko'o'u-kapai ("Mesa People")
  - Kwagwe' Pa'a / Qwaq We' Ba:' ("Hackberry [Springs] band" or "Truxton Canyon/Crozier Canyon band", later merged with the "Peach Springs band")
  - He'l Pa'a / He:l Ba:' ("Milkweed Springs band", lived from Truxton Canyon (or Crozier Canyon) to Ha'ke-takwi'va ("Peach Springs"), suffered heavy casualties.)

Villages (the largest settlements were near Milkweed Springs and Truxton Canyon): Yokamva (today: Crozier [Spring], an American appellation), Djiwa'ldja, Hak-tala'kava, Haktutu'deva, Hê'l ("Milkweed Springs", was used in particular for the irrigation of tobacco), Katha't-nye-ha', Muketega'de, Qwa'ga-we'/Kwagwe' ("Hackberry Springs"), Sewi', Taki'otha'wa, Wi-kanyo

- Nyav-kapai ("Eastern People") (occupied the Colorado Plateau and canyon lands, except for the "Peach Springs band" the northeastern local groups – the "Pine Springs band" as well as the later Havasupai – were able to keep away from the fights successfully and thus avoid heavy losses.)
  - Yi Kwat Pa'a / Iquad Ba:' ("[Lower] Peach Springs band", the present administrative headquarters Peach Springs (Hàkđugwi:v) of the Hualapai Reserve is located in its former territory, the "Hackberry band" joined the "Peach Springs band" after severe losses)
  - Ha'kasa Pa'a / Hak saha Ba:' ("Pine Springs band", also known as "Stinking Water band", joint use areas in the northeastern part of Hualapai territory with the Havasooa Pa'a band)
  - Havasooa Pa'a / Hav'su Ba:' ("Cataract Canyon band", call themselves Havasu Baja or Havsuw' Baaja – "People of the Blue Green Water", lived in several groups along Havasu Creek in the Cataract Canyon (Havasu Canyon) and in adjacent valleys of the Grand Canyon, today known as Havasupai.)

Villages (not included are that of the Havasupai): Agwa'da, Ha'ke-takwi'va/Haketakwtva/Hàkđugwi:v ("Peach Springs proper", literally: "a series/group of springs"), Haksa', Hānya-djiluwa'ya, Tha've-nalnalwi'dje, Wiwakwa'ga, Wi Kasala ("Many Sharp Points Mountain"), Yiga't/Yi Kwat ("Lower Peach Springs")

=== Middle Mountain People ===
Witoov Mi'uka Pa'a ("Separate Mountain Range People") lived west of the Plateau People subtribe and mostly north of today's city Kingman, ranged over the Cerbat and Black Mountains and portions of the Hualapai, Detrital, and Sacramento Valleys.

- Soto'lve-kapai ("Western People")
  - Wikawhata Pa'a / Wi gahwa da Ba:' ("Red Rock band", lived in the northern part of the area up to Lake Mead and Colorado River in the north, joined the "Cerbat Mountain band" after heavy casualties.)
  - Ha Emete Pa'a / Ha'emede: Ba:' (literally: "White Rock Water band", better known as "Cerbat Mountains band", lived in the southern portion of the area, principally in the Cerbat Mountains (Ha'emede:) north of Beale's Springs)

Villages (most settlements were near springs along the eastern slopes of each mountain range): Amadata ("Willow Beach" near Hoover Dam), Chimethi'ap, Ha'a Taba ("Whiskey Springs"), Ha-kamuê'/Ha'a kumawe' ("Beale's Springs"), Ham sipa (near Temple Bar, flooded by Lake Mead), Háka-tovahádja, Ha'a Kawila, Hamte'/Ha'a Emete/Ha'emede: ("White Rock Water", name of a spring in the Cerbat Mountains), Ha'theweli'-kio', Ivthi'ya-tanakwe, Kenyuā'tci, Kwatéhá, Nyi'l'ta, Quwl'-nye-há, Sava Ha'a ("Dolan Springs"), Sina Ha'a ("Buzzard Spring"), Thawinūya, Tevaha:ja (today: "Canyon Station"), Waika'i'la, Wa-nye-ha'/Wana Ha'a, Wi'ka-tavata'va, Wi-kawea'ta, Winya'-ke-tawasa, Wiyakana'mo

=== Yavapai Fighters ===
Yavapai Fighters were the largest group, occupied the southern half of the Hualapai country and were the first to fight the enemy Yavapai – called by the Hualapai Ji'wha', "The Enemy" – living direct to their south, were almost wiped out during the Hualapai War by fighting, systematic destruction of supplies and fields by the US Army and by famines and diseases erupting thereby, bands listed from west to east:

- Hual'la-pai / Howa'la-pai / Hwa:lbáy ("Tall Ponderosa Pine People", "Pinery People")
  - Amat Whala Pa'a / Ha Whala Pa'a / Mad hwa:la Ba:' (literally: "Ponderosa Pine Tree Mountain band", better known as "Hualapai Mountains band", inhabited the Hualapai Mountains east of present-day Kingman and south of Beale's Springs westward to the Colorado River Valley)

Villages (were concentrated near springs and streams at the northern end of the range): Walnut Creek, Hake-djeka'dja, Ilwi'nya-ha', Kahwa't, Tak-tada'pa

- Kwe'va-kapai / Koowev Kopai ("Southern People")
  - Tekiauvla Pa'a / Teki'aulva Pa'a ("Big Sandy River band", also known as "Haksigaela Ba:'", occupied the reach of permanent river flow along the Big Sandy River between Wikieup and Signal, although ranged over in the adjacent mountain slopes.)
  - Burro Creek band (lived on the southern tip of the territory of the Tekiauvla Pa'a partly in Upper Burro Creek Wilderness, farmed along streams and throughout canyons and plateaus along both sides of Burro Creek, intermarried oft with adjacent Yavapai – therefore they were oft mistaken by the Americans for Yavapai, joined after the war larger Hualapai local groups and some Yavapai)

Villages: Burro Creek, Chivekaha', Djimwā'nsevio'/Chimwava suyowo' ("Little Cane Springs", literally: "He dragged a Chemehuevi around."), Ha-djiluwa'ya, Hapu'k/Hapuk/Ha'a pook ("[Cofer] Hot Spring"), Kwakwa', Kwal-hwa'ta, Kwathā'wa, Magio'o' ("Francis Creek"), Tak-mi'nva/Takaminva ("Big Cane Springs")

- Hakia'tce-pai ("Mohon Mountain People") also known as "Talta'l-kuwa", occupied rugged mountain country.
  - Ha'a Kiacha Pa'a / Ha gi a:ja Ba:' (literally: "Fort Rock Creek band", better known as "Mohon Mountains band" or "Mahone Mountain band", "Fort Rock Creek" is the American appellation of a spring and their main settlement on Fort Rock Creek, headwaters of Trout Creek, lived in the Mohon Mountains.)
  - Whala Kijapa P'a / Hwalgijapa Ba:' ("Juniper Mountains band", lived in the Juniper Mountains)

Villages: Cottonwood Creek (or "Cottonwood Station"), Hakeskia'l/Ha'a Kesbial ("where one creek goes into another"), Ha'a Kiacha/Hakia'ch/Hakia'tce ("Fort Rock Creek Spring", main settlement), Ka'nyu'tekwa', Knight Creek, Tha'va-ka-lavala'va, Trout Creek, Willow Creek, Wi-ka-tāva, Witevikivol, Witkitana'kwa

== Education ==
Sections of the Hualapai Reservation in Mohave County are within the Peach Springs Unified School District and the Hackberry School District. According to the Valentine Elementary School District, some Hualapai students go outside of the reservation to that school district. As Peach Springs USD closed its high school (Music Mountain Junior/Senior High School) in 2008, high school students may attend school in the Kingman Unified School District or the Seligman Unified School District.

According to Coconino County's parcel viewer, the Hualapai reservation sections in that county are in the "Unorganized School District #00". According to Arizona law, an unorganized school district is one that does not have a high school.

The portion of the Hualapai Reservation in Yavapai County is within the Seligman district.

== See also ==
- Bat Cave mine
- Grand Canyon Skywalk
- Kiowa Gordon, actor in New Moon
- Indian removal
- Genocide
