= Diamond Creek (Arizona) =

Intermittent tributary to the Colorado River

- Location of mouth

Location
- Country: United States
- Reservation: Hualapai

Physical characteristics
- Mouth
  - coordinates: 35.7444133°N 113.3178034°W

Basin features
- River system: Colorado River

Diamond Creek (Hualapai: Gwada) is an intermittent stream that flows through the Hualapai tribal reservation generally north from Peach Springs, Arizona to the Colorado River.

== Diamond Creek Road ==
Diamond Creek Road is graded in the river canyon adjacent to, and in some cases, within the streambed of Diamond Creek. Diamond Creek Road provides the only vehicular access to the Colorado River between Lees Ferry, 225 miles (362 km) upriver and Pierce Ferry, 52 miles (84 km) downriver. This access makes Diamond Creek a popular location for whitewater rafting trips to take out from trips through the Grand Canyon. Rafting trips also launch from the same location and proceed downriver to Lake Mead. The Hualapai tribal government charges a fee for all vehicles and people traversing the road.

== Flash flooding ==
During periods of heavy rain Diamond Creek is prone to flash flooding. Flash floods have historically damaged or destroyed the Diamond Creek Road forcing closure and, in one instance, washing vehicles into the Colorado River.

== See also ==
- List of tributaries of the Colorado River
- List of Colorado River rapids and features
