= Schoolhouse at Truxton Canyon Training School =

- U.S. National Register of Historic Places
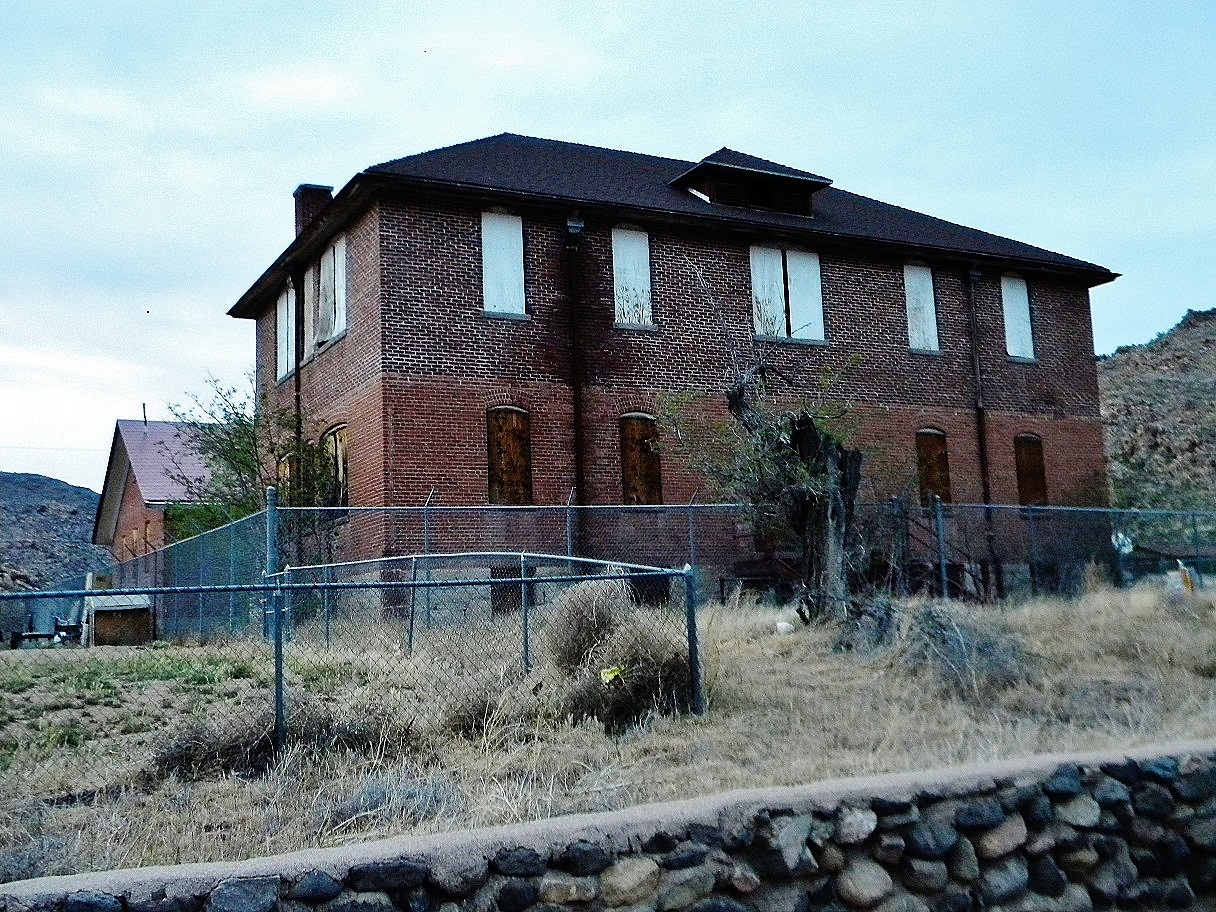

- Location within Arizona Location within the United States
- Location: AZ 66, Valentine, Arizona
- Coordinates: 35°23′12″N 113°39′37″W
- Area: less than one acre
- Built: 1903
- Built by: Office of Indian Affairs
- Architectural style: Colonial Revival
- NRHP reference No.: 03001197
- Added to NRHP: November 21, 2003

The Schoolhouse at Truxton Canyon Training School, which has also been known as the Truxton Canyon Indian School and as the Valentine Indian School, is a historic schoolhouse that was built in 1903. It was built using Colonial Revival architecture as a work of the Office of Indian Affairs, and was expanded, compatibly with the Colonial Revival style, in 1929. It was listed on the National Register of Historic Places in 2003.

It was deemed significant for its role in "educating predominantly Hualapai but also Apache, Havasupai, Hopi, Navajo, Tohono O'odham (Papago), Pima, and Yavapai children during the early twentieth century", and also "as an expression of Office of Indian Affairs architecture during the 'Assimilation Policy' era, when boarding school buildings in Euroamerican styles were designed to educate Indian children in environments entirely foreign from their own. The architecture expressed the intent on the part of the federal government to separate a student from their family and culture and to provide basic skills for earning a living away from the reservation."

The school operated from 1903 until 1937. At the time of its NRHP nomination it was owned by the Hualapai Indian nation, which had plans to renovate the building.

== Student education ==
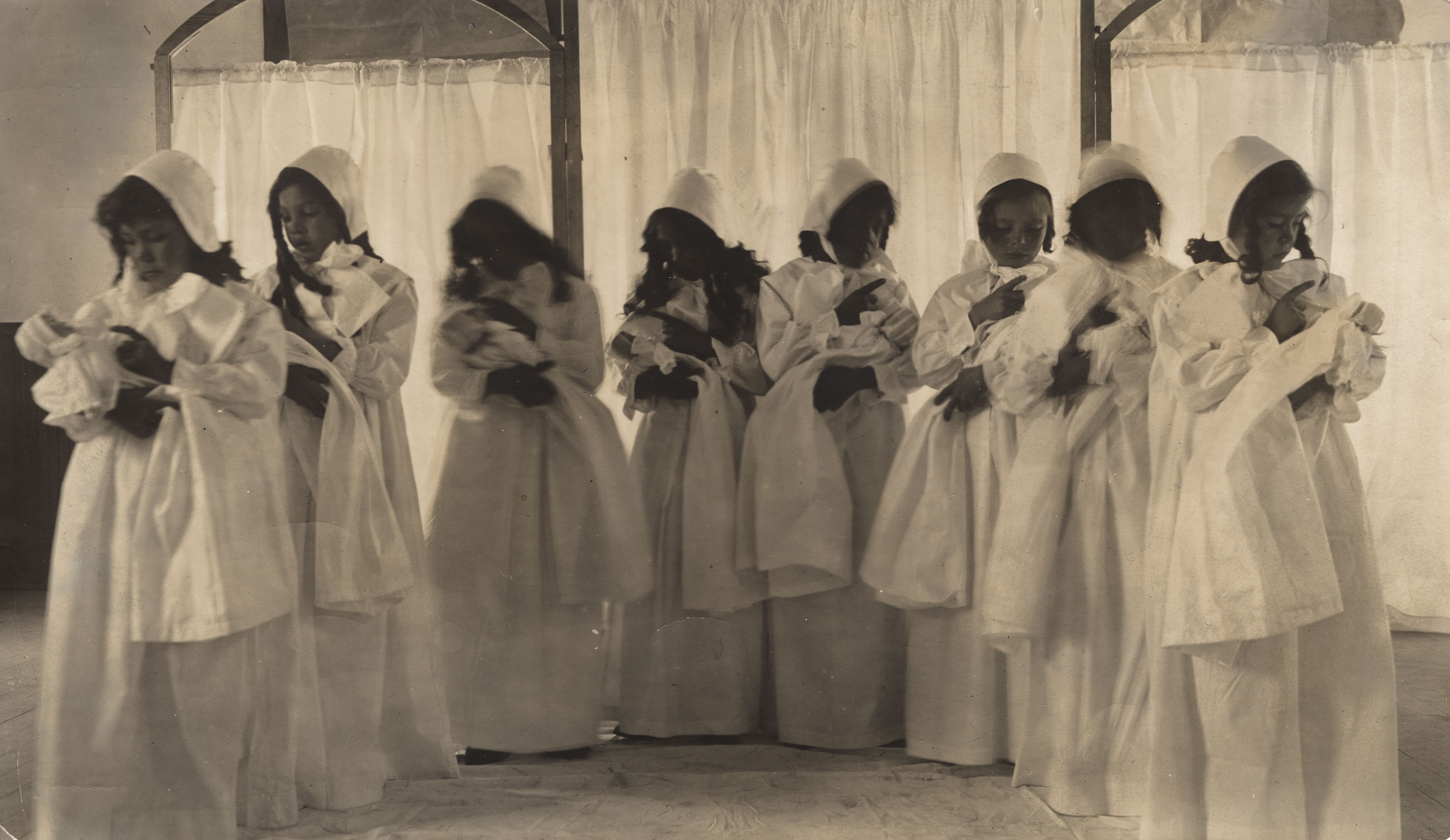
Native American students in Pilgrim dresses

The schools first year of operation they enrolled approximately 88 students in 1901. The first two years of operation there was no main schoolhouse until, the brick main schoolhouse, was completed in 1903. Courses would begin in the new building in the fall and the enrollment of students would then be 150 students. The female student population of the school worked towards skills that would be useful for jobs that involved beadwork as well as laundering. The male student population were educated in classes that would help them get jobs in industrial fields. The students would spend half of their school day working around the schoolhouse with chores such as cooking, laundering, and washing as well as agricultural jobs as well. The students were separated by gender and educated in order to support the modern American view of the nuclear family by allowing the female students to perform housework and the male students learn trades.

The students would then spend the other half participating in regular studies and vocational trainings. A lot of the Native American children would at first struggle to learn at a regular pace because the classes and teachers all taught the students in English and the students were not allowed to speak their native languages. The curriculum had many military-like aspects which was undergone by the Principal, these would include military drills such as falling in formation like a regime, standing at attention, or marching from class and to meals.

== Student experience ==
From the late 1800s to early 1900s, Indian Boarding schools increased in size and more were needed in order to educate the Native American population, the Truxton Canyon training school was built in place of what was known as the Hackberry Day school, which it replaced. The Truxton Canyon training school was built in order to offer an education to the Native American children as well as help them assimilate to American culture through the American school system.

Accounts given by the teachers at the time spoke of the type of care the school and students received and described it as poor. The early depictions of 1901 describe the first attempt at opening a school here as poor since they received no supplies such as beds, dishes, and other important resources. Accounts also of the disease and illness that had spread through the school such as measles, smallpox, influenza, and others causing great unrest and discomfort in the students and negatively impacting their progress.

The successful students that performed exceedingly well in their studies could be transferred to off-reservation boarding schools such as the Phoenix Indian Industrial boarding school which is located at the capital of Arizona and away from the student's home tribes. By placing the students away from reservations and closer to large white-populations the students could have an easier time assimilating to American culture.

The children at the Truxton Indian school were previously sent to different schools in the surrounding areas, far from their reservation such as the Mojave school. After twelve of those kids were sent to a different school without the advisement of the parents and two of them died, the leaders of the Hualapai demanded a boarding school that was closer to their home. In an attempt to break the spirits of the children and to divide them from their cultures and families, upon arrival at the school, their hair was cut, their clothes were burned and they were given white names. Children were also discouraged from practicing their own religious beliefs. Instead they were taught about christianity, they were taught how to pray and to read the Bible. Despite the proximity to home, death and other abuses of the children were not avoided at the new location. Children, if found misbehaving, were beaten, slapped, hit with wooden paddles and even whipped to ensure that they would not act out again. Because of these harsh living circumstances, children would run away from the school, if found they were often punished with solitary confinement and deprivation of food and water. The students also participated in jobs on campus, they cleaned, they cooked and they maintained the grounds of the school, often spending more time in that labor than their studies.

== Architecture and agriculture ==
The Truxton Canyon Indian School was constructed in 1903 and was modeled after the Colonial Revival Architectural style as a way to prioritize colonist ideals over Native American ideals. The main schoolhouse would undergo multiple adjustments during the school's operations. These additions would include a second story (1924), the conversion of the school's auditorium to a classroom (1927), a new auditorium placed behind the school (1928), and an expansion done to the schoolhouse to increase enrollment size (1924–27).

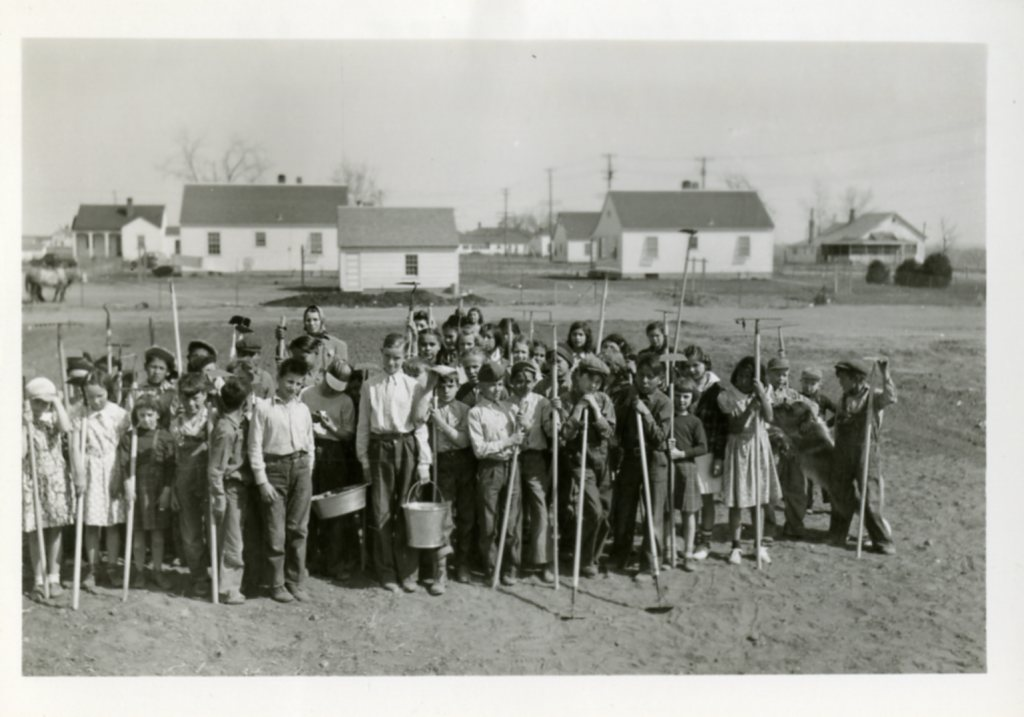
Farming Schoolchildren

The 1901 teacherage and dormitory as well as the bricks used to create them was constructed by the Hualapai students under the supervision of the current principal. Students of the agricultural classes as well as their instructors would plant and take care of the canals, fruit trees, and landscaping around the school's property during the course of its operation.

After 1937 the school ceased operation as a Native American boarding school and the dormitory and teacherage were taken down, the bricks from those buildings were then used to build the neighboring town's museum, the Mohave County Historical Museum. A few of the wood frame buildings were renovated as well and the nearby agricultural fields were left unattended and the neighboring maintained foliage died.

== See also ==
- American Indian boarding schools
- Phoenix Indian School
- Cultural assimilation of Native Americans
- Many Farms Community School
- Carlisle Indian Industrial School
