= Peach Springs, Arizona =

CDP in Mohave County, Arizona

Peach Springs, Arizona Walapai: Hàkđugwi:v
- Census-designated place
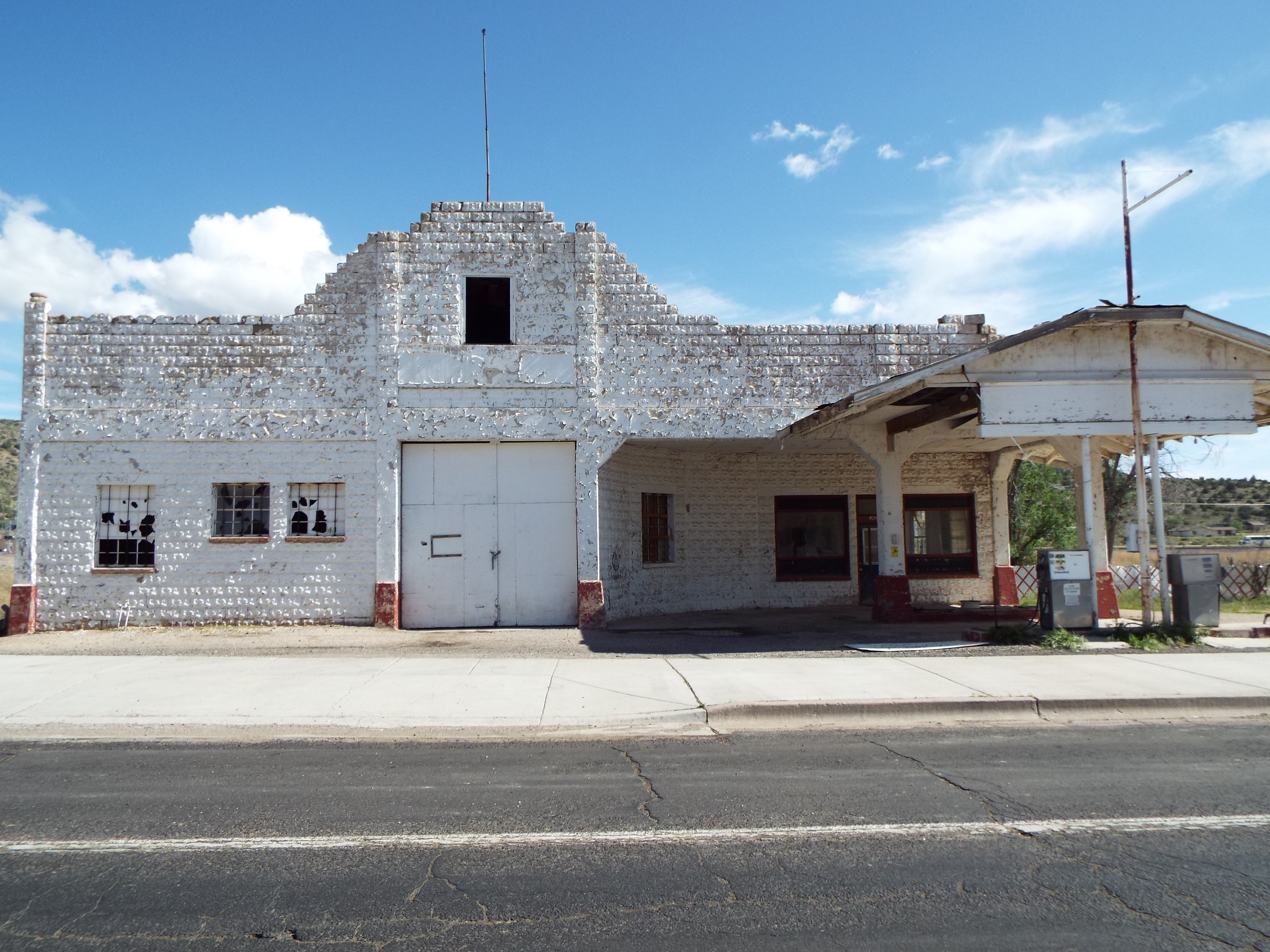
- John Osterman Shell gas station

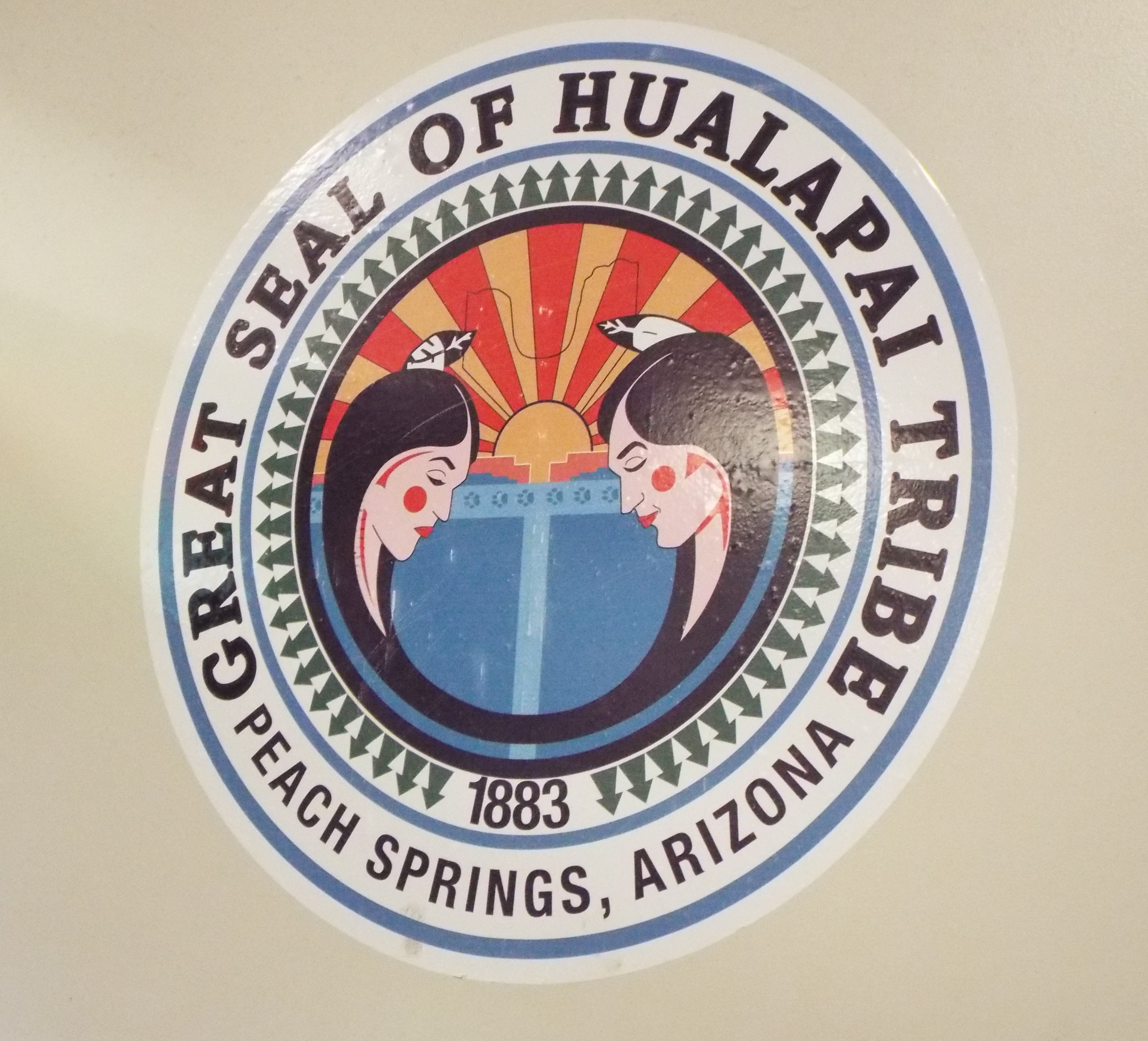
- Seal

- Location in Mohave County and the state of Arizona

- Location within Arizona Location within the United States
- Coordinates: 35°32′4″N 113°25′24″W
- Country: United States
- State: Arizona
- County: Mohave

Area
  - Total: 7.92 sq mi (20.50 km^{2})
  - Land: 7.92 sq mi (20.50 km^{2})
  - Water: 0 sq mi (0.00 km^{2})
- Elevation: 4,876 ft (1,486 m)

Population (2020)
  - Total: 1,098
  - Density: 138.7/sq mi (53.57/km^{2})
- Time zone: UTC-7 (MST)
- ZIP code: 86434
- Area code: 928
- FIPS code: 04-53770
- GNIS feature ID: 2409042

Peach Springs (Walapai: Hàkđugwi:v) is a census-designated place (CDP) in Mohave County, Arizona, United States. The population was 1,098 at the 2020 census. Peach Springs serves as the administrative headquarters of the Hualapai people and is located on the Hualapai Reservation.

== Geography ==
Peach Springs is in eastern Mohave County on both sides of Arizona State Route 66 (historic U.S. Route 66). It is 50 miles (80 km) northeast of Kingman and 37 miles (60 km) northwest of Seligman.

According to the United States Census Bureau, the CDP has a total area of 7.9 square miles (20 km^{2}), all land. The community is mainly on the north side of Yampai Canyon, drained by west-flowing Truxton Wash.

== Demographics ==
Historical population
Census	Pop.	Note	%±
1990	787		—
2000	600		−23.8%
2010	1,090		81.7%
2020	1,098		0.7%

=== 2020 census ===
As of the 2020 census, Peach Springs had a population of 1,098. The median age was 25.1 years. 39.8% of residents were under the age of 18 and 7.7% of residents were 65 years of age or older. For every 100 females there were 84.8 males, and for every 100 females age 18 and over there were 71.7 males age 18 and over.

0.0% of residents lived in urban areas, while 100.0% lived in rural areas.

There were 277 households in Peach Springs, of which 52.7% had children under the age of 18 living in them. Of all households, 30.0% were married-couple households, 18.1% were households with a male householder and no spouse or partner present, and 44.4% were households with a female householder and no spouse or partner present. About 14.1% of all households were made up of individuals and 3.3% had someone living alone who was 65 years of age or older.

There were 315 housing units, of which 12.1% were vacant. The homeowner vacancy rate was 1.7% and the rental vacancy rate was 4.8%.

Racial composition as of the 2020 census
Race	Number	Percent
White	10	0.9%
Black or African American	4	0.4%
American Indian and Alaska Native	1,053	95.9%
Asian	4	0.4%
Native Hawaiian and Other Pacific Islander	1	0.1%
Some other race	6	0.5%
Two or more races	20	1.8%
Hispanic or Latino (of any race)	64	5.8%

=== 2000 census ===
As of the census of 2000, there were 600 people, 166 households, and 139 families residing in the CDP. The population density was 87.3 inhabitants per square mile (33.7/km^{2}). There were 219 housing units at an average density of 31.9 per square mile (12.3/km^{2}). The racial makeup of the CDP was 93.0% Native American, 4.3% White, 2.3% from other races, and 0.3% from two or more races. 5.3% of the population were Hispanic or Latino of any race.

There were 166 households, out of which 48.2% had children under the age of 18 living with them, 38.6% were married couples living together, 35.5% had a female householder with no husband present, and 15.7% were non-families. 12.7% of all households were made up of individuals, and 3.6% had someone living alone who was 65 years of age or older. The average household size was 3.61 and the average family size was 3.83.

In the CDP the population was spread out, with 40.5% under the age of 18, 10.0% from 18 to 24, 25.8% from 25 to 44, 17.3% from 45 to 64, and 6.3% who were 65 years of age or older. The median age was 24 years. For every 100 females, there were 95.4 males. For every 100 females age 18 and over, there were 84.0 males.

The median income for a household in the CDP was $18,194, and the median income for a family was $17,292. Males had a median income of $20,833 versus $15,500 for females. The per capita income for the CDP was $6,756. About 38.2% of families and 36.6% of the population were below the poverty line, including 38.7% of those under age 18 and 55.4% of those age 65 or over.

== Arts and culture ==
The town has the Hualapai Lodge, a motel and a small grocery market with fuel. It is an access point to Hualapai Hilltop, 67 miles (108 km) to the northeast, which is the trailhead from which hikers descend an 8-mile (13 km) trail, with a drop of 2,004 feet (611 m), to the town of Supai, from which Havasu Falls and other waterfalls can be visited.

Peach Springs is located on the route of the former Atchison, Topeka and Santa Fe Railway (now the BNSF Railway) and on historic US Route 66. Route 66 brought large numbers of cross-country travellers through the town until Interstate 40 was opened 25 miles (40 km) to the south in 1978. I-40 diverges from SR 66 at Seligman 37 miles (60 km) to the east, and the two roads do not meet again until Kingman 50 miles (80 km) to the west. As no connecting roads join the two highways at Peach Springs, the town went from being on the beaten path to being more than thirty miles from the new main road overnight. I-40 shortened the highway distance from Kingman to Seligman by 14 miles (23 km) at the expense of turning villages like Truxton, Valentine and Hackberry into overnight ghost towns. Peach Springs survived as the administrative base of the Hualapai tribe but suffered irreparable economic damage.

The John Osterman Shell Station, built by a Swedish immigrant in 1929, closed soon after the turn of the millennium. In 2007, the Hualapai Tribe received a $28,000 federal matching grant to rehabilitate the building, which has yet to re-open but which was listed on the National Register of Historic Places in 2012.

== In popular culture ==
Peach Springs served as one of the inspirations for the town of Radiator Springs in the 2006 Disney/Pixar animated film Cars. The creators of the movie took a research trip along Route 66, visiting many small towns and drawing inspiration from their unique character and charm.

== Education ==
It is within the Peach Springs Unified School District. At one time it had its own high school, Music Mountain Junior/Senior High School.

Valentine Elementary School District has its single K-8 school with a Peach Springs postal address, but the school is physically in Truxton. No part of the Peach Springs CDP is in that district.
