= Purple Heart Trail (Arizona) =

Purple Heart Trail (Arizona) can refer to:

- Interstate 10 from the California state line to the New Mexico state line
- Interstate 40 from the California state line to the New Mexico state line
