= Cozy Dog Drive In =

Restaurant in Springfield, Illinois, U.S.

Coordinates: 39.7624°N 89.6488°W

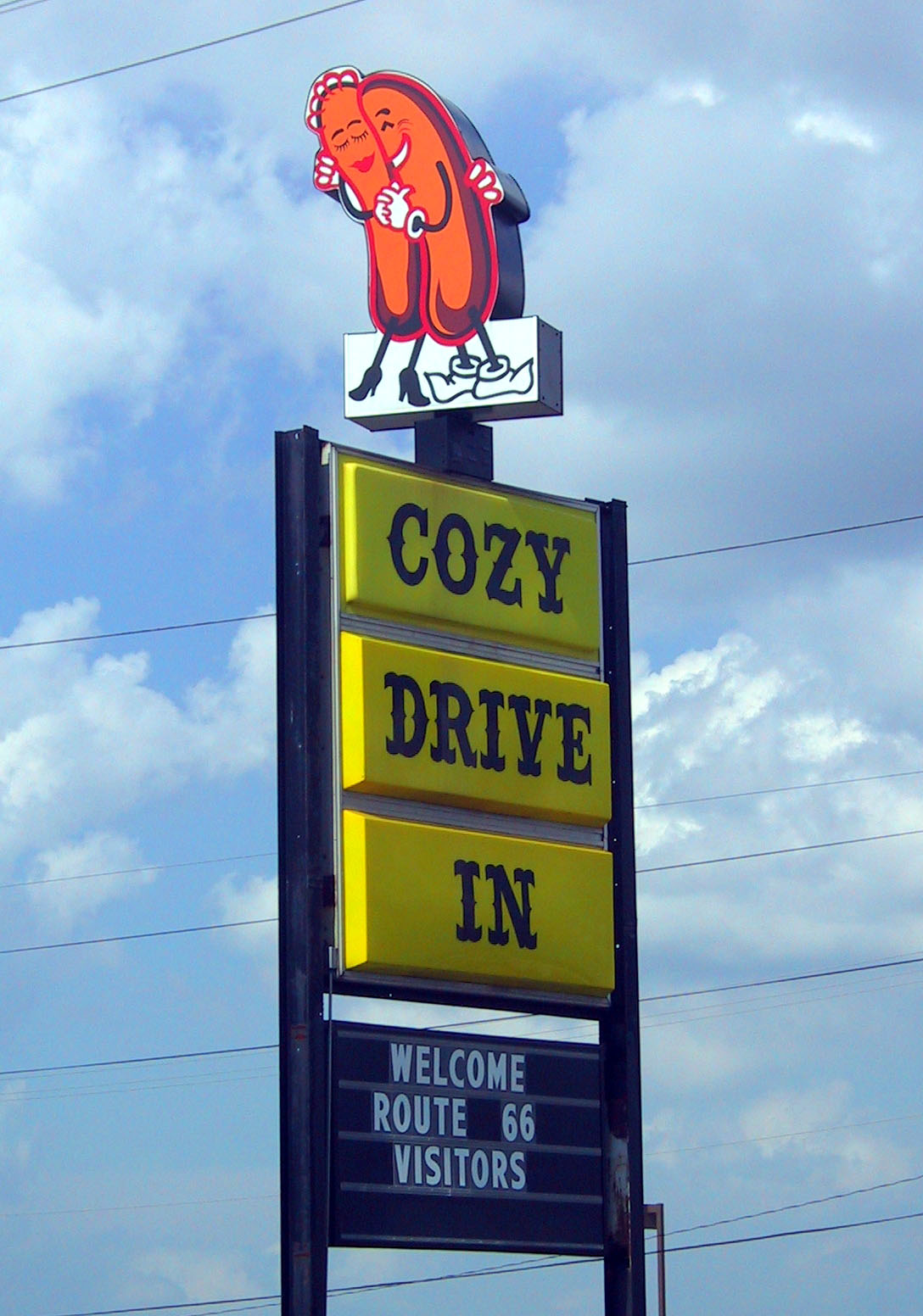

Restaurant information
- Established: 1946
- Location: Springfield, Illinois, U.S.

The Cozy Dog Drive In is a restaurant located at 2935 South Sixth Street in Springfield, Illinois, United States.

The crusty curs, which were hot dogs coated in a corn meal batter, were sold at the USO club and at the base PX by Ed Waldmire. Upon returning to Springfield, Ed's wife, Virginia, stated that "crusty cur" was not a good name for regular civilians. Together, they decided upon the name "Cozy Dog," and Virginia created the original logo of two hot dogs in a loving embrace. Ed then began selling the corn dogs at the Illinois State Fair in 1946 where they gained popularity. The original Cozy Dog stand was opened outside of his house, also in 1946. A second stand was opened, but it was later moved into a building that shared seating with Dairy Queen. Cozy Dogs were originally sold for 15 cents.

In 1996, Cozy Dog moved to its current location just north of the original location. Customers can come inside and sit down, order to-go, or go through a drive up window. Orders are taken at the counter and then brought out to the customer. Ed's son and daughter-in-law, Buz and Sue, leased the restaurant from Ed. After their divorce in 2001, Buz sold his half to Sue.

Cozy Dog is a popular attraction on U.S. Route 66. The restaurant features Route 66 memorabilia and it also features a gift shop with Route 66 merchandise. Springfield, IL, memorabilia is housed there also. They have a guest book where tourists from all over can sign. Route 66 artist Bob Waldmire was the son of Ed and Virginia. He traveled along the route, getting ideas for designs for postcards and maps.

The Cozy Dog is one of three Springfield restaurants featured in an October 2009 episode of Man v. Food on the Travel Channel. It was also featured in WQED's documentary A Hot Dog Program in 1999.

== See also ==
- Corn dog
- U.S. Route 66 in Illinois
