= Valentine Elementary School District =

School district in Arizona, United States

Valentine Elementary School District 22

Location
- 12491 N Byers St. Truxton, Arizona 86434 United States
- Coordinates: 35°29′14″N 113°34′6″W

District information
- Grades: K-8
- Schools: 1

Students and staff
- Students: 94
- Teachers: 5
- Staff: 14
- Student–teacher ratio: 19 : 1

Other information
- Website: www.valentineaz.net

Valentine Elementary School District 22 is a public school district based in Mohave County, Arizona.

It consists of a single K-8 school, Valentine Elementary School, in Truxton, with a Peach Springs postal address. As of 2022 its student body was fewer in number than 100, with 84% of them being Native Americans, with many of them from the Hualapai Indian Reservation, which is outside of the district. That year, there were about 14 employees.

The district serves Truxton, Valentine, Crozier, and a section of Hackberry.

== History ==
Originally located in Valentine, the school was established in 1924. In 1969 the school began classes in its current location.
