= Quartermaster Canyon =

Valley in Grand Canyon National Park

Coordinates: 33.9678°N 113.7594°W

Quartermaster Canyon is a valley (a side canyon) in the Grand Canyon west of Grand Canyon National Park, in the Hualapai Indian Reservation in U.S. state of Arizona.

The canyon's namesake is Quartermaster, a member of the Hualapai tribe who settled there in the early 20th century.

Quartermaster Canyon is a popular destination for Grand Canyon helicopter tours. In the year 2013, 385 helicopter tours landed near Quartermaster Canyon, raising questions from National Geographic over sustainability. In February 2018, a commercial helicopter crashed at Quartermaster Canyon, killing three of its six passengers.
