= Arizona State Route 66 =

State highway in Arizona, United States

State Route 66
- SR 66 highlighted in red

Route information
- Maintained by ADOT and Yavapai County Public Works
- Length: 66.74 mi (107.41 km) Only includes state-maintained mileage
- Existed: 1984–present
- History: Previously US 66
- Tourist routes: Historic Route 66

Major junctions
- West end: Michael Street in Kingman
- Future I-11 / I-40 / US 93 in Kingman; BL 40 / Historic US 66 in Seligman
- East end: I-40 / BL 40 in Seligman

Location
- Country: United States
- State: Arizona
- Counties: Mohave, Coconino, Yavapai

Highway system
- Arizona State Highway System; Interstate; US; State; Scenic Proposed; Former
← US 66	→ SR 67

State Route 66 (SR 66) is a surface road in the U.S. state of Arizona in Mohave, Coconino, and Yavapai Counties. In 1914, the road was designated as part of the National Old Trails Highway but in 1926 was re-designated as U.S. Route 66 (US 66). In 1985, US 66 was dropped from the highway system. Parts of the highway were either absorbed into Interstate 40 (I-40), turned over to the state (SR 66), or turned over to Yavapai County.

== Route description ==
SR 66 is a relic of the former US 66 and is the only part of old US 66 in Arizona to have state route markers. In 1990, the state turned over the easternmost 16.8 miles (27.0 km) of SR 66 (known as Crookton Road) to Yavapai County for maintenance.

=== Mohave County ===
SR 66 begins at the intersection of Andy Devine Street and Michael Street where the roadway continues westward as Historic US 66. 1,230 feet (375 m) northeast of the Andy Devine and Michael Street intersection, it meets I-40/US 93. 0.45 miles (0.724 km) northeast of I-40/US 93, it then becomes a divided highway for 4.63 miles (7.45 km) before turning into a two-lane undivided highway. 12 miles (19 km) down the road, it passes through the CDP of Antares while curving to the east-southeast. After Antares, it passes through Hackberry where it meets CR 141 (Hackberry Road). It then passes through the census-designated places of Crozier, Truxton, and Peach Springs before entering Coconino County.

=== Coconino and Yavapai counties ===
East of the Mohave–Coconino county line, SR 66 has an intersection with Indian Route 18 in the Hualapai Indian Reservation. SR 66 then become a four-lane divided highway at the Grand Canyon Caverns. After the Grand Canyon Caverns, SR 66 then becomes an undivided highway and curves to the southeast and Coconino–Yavapai county line twice before having an intersection with Pica Road. After Pica Road, it crosses the Coconino–Yavapai again where the maintenance of SR 66 by the Arizona Department of Transportation ends.

After the eastern terminus of the ADOT-maintenance section of SR 66 near the intersection of Pica Canyon Road, it makes two curves before entering Seligman. West of downtown Seligman and south of Seligman Airport, SR 66 began its concurrency with Interstate 40 Business. BL 40/SR 66/Historic US 66 passed by many attractive sites in downtown Seligman including the Snow Cap Drive-In.

== History ==
=== U.S. Route 66 ===
Between the California state line and Kingman, the original alignment is now known as Oatman Highway and passed through the old mining town of Oatman. A later alignment (via Yucca) is now Interstate 40. The older alignment passes through the Black Mountains complete with numerous hairpin turns. This area is desert.

From Kingman to Seligman, it took a path now followed by modern State Route 66.

East of Seligman and continuing beyond Flagstaff, the area is mountainous (not desert) and covered with pine forests. Continuing toward the New Mexico state line, much of US 66 has been replaced with I-40. Various stretches of the old highway exist as frontage roads and business loops of I-40.

=== State Route 66 ===
In 1984, US 66 was officially removed from the state highway system of Arizona. Most of the old highway had been replaced by I-40, but the portion of the interstate between Kingman and Seligman was developed to follow a new alignment to the south. The remaining northern segment ultimately became SR 66. In 1990, the state turned over the easternmost 16.8 miles (27.0 km) of SR 66 (known as Crookton Road) to Yavapai County for maintenance.

== Major intersections ==
County	Location	mi	km	Destinations	Notes
Mohave	Kingman	0.00	0.00	Historic US 66 west (Andy Devine Avenue) / Michael Street	Western terminus of SR 66; western end of Historic US 66 concurrency; road continues as Historic US 66 west
Mohave	Kingman	0.22– 0.25	0.35– 0.40	Future I-11 / I-40 / US 93 – Los Angeles, Las Vegas, Flagstaff, Phoenix	Western end of state maintenance; ADOT signs this as western terminus; exit 53 on I-40
Coconino	No major junctions				
Yavapai	No major junctions				
Coconino	No major junctions				
Coconino–Yavapai county line		66.74	107.41	Eastern end of state maintenance	
Yavapai	Seligman			BL 40 west – Los Angeles	ADOT signs this as eastern terminus; western end of BL 40 concurrency
Yavapai	Seligman			Historic US 66 east (Crookton Road) – Crookton	Eastern end of Historic US 66 concurrency
Yavapai	Seligman			I-40 / BL 40 ends – Los Angeles, Flagstaff	Eastern terminus of SR 66; eastern end of BL 40 concurrency
1.000 mi = 1.609 km; 1.000 km = 0.621 mi: Concurrency terminus

== Gallery ==
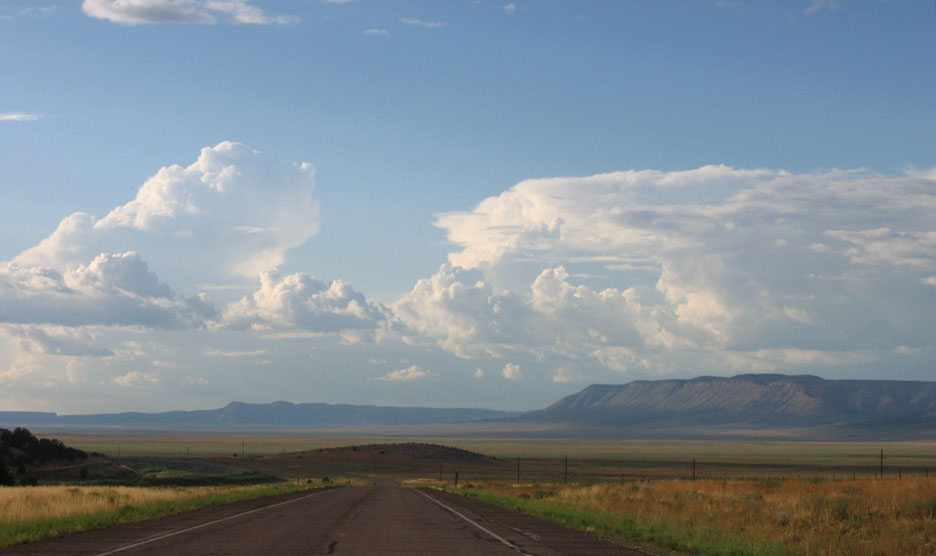
State Route 66 west of Seligman

== See also ==
- National Old Trails Road
- Interstate 40 Business (Kingman, Arizona)
- County Route 10 (Mohave County, Arizona)
