= Camp Beale Springs =

- U.S. National Register of Historic Places
- Nearest city: Kingman, Arizona
- Built: 1857
- NRHP reference No.: 74000459
- Added to NRHP: July 18, 1974

Camp Beale Springs, near Kingman, Arizona, also known as Fort Beale, was a historic military facility that dates from 1857. Camp Beale Springs was established and became official in 1871. It was listed on the National Register of Historic Places in 1974. It was a military outpost during the Hualapai War. Its location is not disclosed by the National Register, as is done for many archeological sites which have importance for their potential to yield information in the future.

It was a campsite on the Beale Wagon Road developed by Captain Edward Beale. For centuries previous it had been used already.
