= National Historic Route 66 Federation =

Historic preservation association

The National Historic Route 66 Federation was founded in 1995 for the purpose of saving the businesses, communities and roadbed of U.S. Route 66. The famous road carried travelers across much of the country from the day it was commissioned on November 11, 1926 through June 25, 1985 when it was decommissioned.

== Historical background ==
Since its construction, most motorists preferred to travel that way because the weather tended to be more hospitable than along the more northerly highways. Businesses and entire towns sprang up to cater to the ever-increasing traffic. Although it brought considerable prosperity, the thoroughfare also spawned bumper-to-bumper congestion in the communities and numerous accidents on the rural stretches leading to the gruesome nickname, "Bloody 66".

Just as it seemed the mostly two lane road could not handle another vehicle, on June 29, 1956, President Dwight Eisenhower signed the Interstate Highway Act into law, which allocated $25 billion for the construction of 41,000 miles (66,000 km) of interstate highways. Over the next 29 years, section after section of Route 66 was methodically bypassed by multi-lane, high speed expressways enabling motorists to increase their speeds and avoid hazardous congestion. This was a time-saving advantage to those on the move, but a distinct disadvantage to businesses and communities along the Route. Where customers once thronged, they rarely showed up at all, anymore.

== Inspiration ==
By 1994, Route 66 was well on its way to becoming little more than miles of memories. Unaware of these declining conditions, in August of that year, David and Mary Lou Knudson set out to relive their early experiences along the legendary road. Mary Lou remembered traveling it during World War II with her parents as her father, a U.S. Air Force Sergeant, drove between several bases in Illinois and California. David remembered the trip he made in 1963 to move from Detroit to Los Angeles as being like a "2,400-mile carnival". But this time, they couldn't even find the famous byway. They soon discovered it was no longer a U.S. Highway and was not on their map as "US 66". So the Knudsons stopped at a truck stop west of Chicago to ask where it was, and the clerk sold them the "Here It Is" map set which guided them to and along the original road.

The moment they got on what was once Route 66, the Knudsons realized that something was very wrong. The once colorful and often gaudy trading posts, side shows, rare animal displays, motels and cafés were gone. In their place was mile after mile of roadside that was little more than boarded up buildings. Many stretches of roadbed were poorly maintained or completely closed to traffic. Entire towns that were once bustling tourist meccas were all but shut down.

They were saddened by the deterioration of such an important American icon; so much so, they decided to do something about it. As they traveled, they photographed many of the buildings and tape recorded captions for each of their locations. They had planned to take a week to travel to their home in Los Angeles but that turned into 3 weeks. They arrived home laden with hundreds of photos and several tapes of captions. On the trip, David decided to sell the shares in his business and commit his time to developing a nonprofit corporation that would work to save Route 66.

== Establishment ==
To that end, the Knudson's first step was to contact the gentleman who had prepared the Route 66 map set they had used to cross the country. He directed them to the National Park Service office in Santa Fe where they had prepared a study of the Route for Senators Pete Domenici (R) and Jeff Bingaman (D). Between the Knudsons, the Senators and New Mexico Congresswoman Heather Wilson (R) a Congressional Bill was drafted that would help fund the restoration of the famous highway. In 1999, the "National Route 66 Preservation Bill" was passed by the United States Congress and signed into law by President Bill Clinton. The act provides $10 million in matching fund grants to individuals, corporations and communities for the purpose of preserving or restoring historic properties along Route. To this day, David Knudson sits on the grant committee.

Acquiring the funds for restoration through the Bill was the first tangible step toward the renaissance. Although restoration dollars were essential to the Knudson's plans and hopes, bringing in tourists to patronize the businesses was every bit as important. This is where David's advertising and publicity background came into play. He launched a worldwide campaign to turn the Route into a tourist destination. To this day, it is estimated that 40% of the business the Route generates comes from countries other than the U. S.

== John Steinbeck Awards ==
Then came the Federation's John Steinbeck Awards evenings. The purpose of these events was threefold:

1. Present the "John Steinbeck Award" to an individual who had contributed significantly to the preservation of Route 66.
2. Bring Route 66 historians, authors, artists, photographers, business people and enthusiasts together to network and meet to discuss what could be done to preserve the road.
3. Introduce these people to various Route 66 communities and conversely, familiarize citizens within these host communities with the importance of the Route.

The first John Steinbeck Awards Evening was scheduled for May, 1995 in Oklahoma City. The bombing of the Murrah building on April 19 put an end to those plans. The Federation suffered significant financial loss as a result, and it was not until October 1998 that a John Steinbeck Awards Evening took place; this time in Kingman, Arizona. From that year on, the evenings were produced annually in one Route 66 community after another until the last one in San Bernardino, California in September 2005. By that time, Route 66 communities were vying to have the evenings and they would build three-day, communitywide Route 66 celebrations around them. Shortly after that last event, Mary Lou Knudson suffered a debilitating stroke and died three years later. She had been the one who managed the myriad of details involved in producing the large events.

== Promoting Route 66 ==
As the popularity of Route 66 grew around the world, an increasing number of tourists began driving the road and enjoying its history and sights, however most of them were not enjoying the vintage dining and lodging establishments that were so much the essence of early roadside Americana. The majority of travelers were staying in and eating in chain establishments that were familiar to them. The Knudsons had become acquainted with many of the owners of the vintage businesses and knew that most of their facilities were at least as clean and as well run as the chains. They were also usually much less expensive.

In order to introduce the public to the family-owned, vintage enterprises, the first Route 66 Dining & Lodging Guide was published in 1999. It was, and still is prepared from reviews conducted by the "Adopt-A-Hundred" adopters. The Federation's "Adopt-A-Hundred" Program was initially developed to keep an eye on possible preservation problems along the Route such as a bridge, a business or a stretch of roadbed being closed. Adopters canvassed their 100-mile (160 km) sections once a year watching for preservation trouble. So, the adopters were asked to review the dining and lodging businesses while they traveled their sections. The current edition is the 15th and includes over 500 mostly vintage businesses.

== Map guide ==
With the intent of making it as easy as possible for travelers to find the most popular alignments, the Federation commissioned Route 66 artist, historian and cartographer, Jerry McClanahan to produce a map guide. The product, introduced in 2005, was the 200 page, spiral bound EZ66 GUIDE For Travelers. It is now in its 5th edition.

== See also ==
- Route 66 Association

== Sources and further reading ==
- Dedek, Peter (2007). Hip to the Trip: A Cultural History of Route 66. University of New Mexico Press. ISBN 978-0826341945.
- "Famed Biker Bar Aims For G Rating". Daily Press. January 8, 2000.
- "Get Your Kicks on the 75th of Route 66". Los Angeles Times. July 8, 2001.
- "A Golden Road's Unlimited Devotion". USA Today. June 29, 2001.
- "His Life Is Devoted to the Road". The Press Enterprise. October 3, 2005.
- "The History Of Route 66". Mature Focus. July 2009.
- "The John Steinbeck Awards". Federation News. Summer 2000.
- "Jubilee Adds Kicks To Route 66". Press-Telegram. July 22, 2001.
- "Last Picture Show". Los Angeles Times (San Gabriel Valley ed.). May 18, 2001.
- "The Mother Road Turns 75". Home & Away. July–August 2001.
- "Parts of Route 66 Enjoying a Rebirth". The Vancouver Sun. May 3, 2008.
- "Plan to Help Restore the Kicks on Old Route 66 Gets a $10 Million Boost". San Diego Union Tribune.
- "Rediscover Kicks On Route 66". Los Angeles Times. May 16, 2001.
- "Route 66 Connected High Desert to L. A.". Daily Press. December 31, 1999.
- Route 66 Preservation: Success Through Partnerships (Pamphlet). National Park Service.
- Olsen, Russell A. (2011). Route 66 Lost & Found: Mother Road Ruins and Relics; The Ultimate Collection. Voyageur Press. ISBN 978-0760339985.
- Wallis, Michael (1990). Route 66: The Mother Road. St. Martin's Press. ISBN 0312040490.
