= Crozier, Arizona =

- Census-designated place
- Location within the state of Arizona Crozier (the United States)
- Coordinates: 35°25′22″N 113°38′55″W
- Country: United States
- State: Arizona
- County: Mohave

Area
  - Total: 1.05 sq mi (2.72 km^{2})
  - Land: 1.05 sq mi (2.72 km^{2})
  - Water: 0 sq mi (0.00 km^{2})
- Elevation: 3,983 ft (1,214 m)

Population (2020)
  - Total: 21
  - Density: 20.0/sq mi (7.72/km^{2})
- Time zone: UTC-7 (MST)
- Area code: 928
- FIPS code: 04-17460
- GNIS feature ID: 2582766

Crozier is an unincorporated community and census-designated place (CDP) in Mohave County, Arizona, United States. The population was 21 at the 2020 census.

== Geography ==
Crozier is located in eastern Mohave County along Arizona State Route 66, the former US 66. It is 35 miles (56 km) northeast of Kingman, the county seat, and 52 miles (84 km) northwest of Seligman. According to the United States Census Bureau, the CDP has a total area of 1.05 square miles (2.7 km^{2}), all land.

== Demographics ==
Historical population
Census	Pop.	Note	%±
2010	14		—
2020	21		50.0%
U.S. Decennial Census

As of the 2010 census, there were 14 people living in the CDP: 7 male and 7 female. 0 were 19 years old or younger, 2 were ages 20–34, 0 were between the ages of 35 and 49, 7 were between 50 and 64, and the remaining 5 were aged 65 and above. The median age was 59.0 years.

The racial makeup of the CDP was 92.9% White, and 7.1% Other. 7.1% of the population were Hispanic or Latino of any race.

There were 8 households in the CDP, 4 family households (50%) and 4 non-family households (50%), with an average household size of 1.5. Of the family households, all 4 were married couples living together, while the non-family households consisted of 4 adults living alone: 2 male and 2 female.

The CDP contained 11 housing units, of which 8 were occupied and 3 were vacant.

== Education ==
The Valentine Elementary School District, which contains Crozier, has its single K-8 school in Truxton.
