= Truxton, Arizona =

- Census-designated place
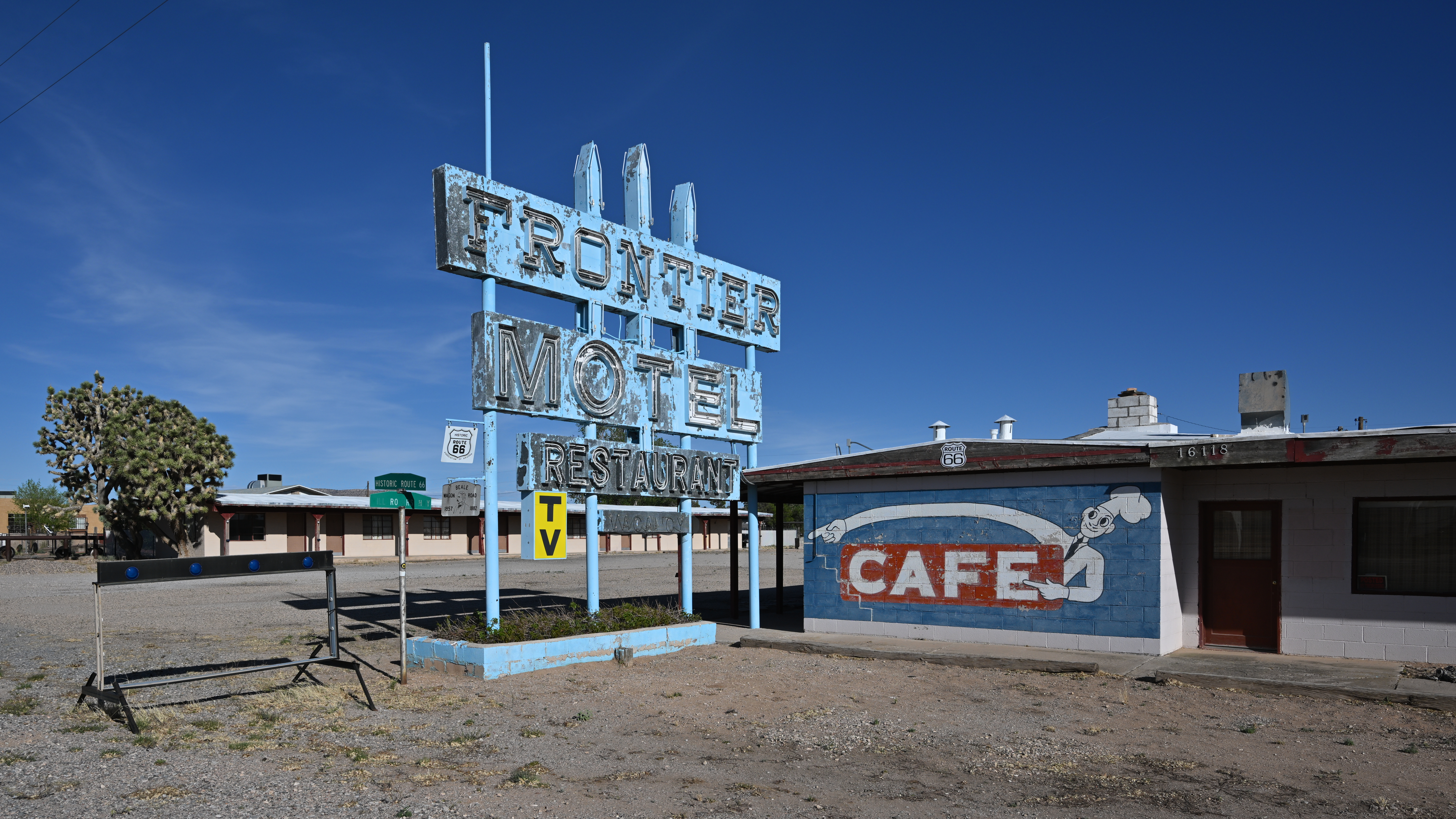
- Frontier Motel, Truxton, Arizona

- Location in Mohave County, Arizona

- Location within Arizona Location within the United States
- Coordinates: 35°29′13″N 113°33′39″W
- Country: United States
- State: Arizona
- County: Mohave

Area
  - Total: 3.82 sq mi (9.90 km^{2})
  - Land: 3.77 sq mi (9.77 km^{2})
  - Water: 0.050 sq mi (0.13 km^{2})
- Elevation: 4,315 ft (1,315 m)

Population (2020)
  - Total: 104
  - Density: 27.6/sq mi (10.64/km^{2})
- Time zone: UTC-7 (MST (no DST))
- FIPS code: 04-75590
- GNIS feature ID: 2582883

Truxton is an unincorporated community and census-designated place (CDP) in Mohave County, in the U.S. state of Arizona. The population was 104 at the 2020 census, down from 134 in 2010.

== History and location ==
Truxton is in eastern Mohave County, along Arizona State Route 66, former U.S. Route 66. It is 41 miles (66 km) northeast of Kingman, the county seat, and 45 miles (72 km) west of Seligman.

The Atlantic and Pacific Railroad section across northern Arizona was built in the early 1880s, and later acquired by the Santa Fe (now BNSF Railway), and included a stop at Truxton. The name comes from Truxton Springs, found by Edward Fitzgerald Beale when surveying and a laying wagon road through Arizona in 1857-58, see Beale's Wagon Road. "Truxtun" (slightly different spelling) was a family name; his son was Truxtun Beale, and his mother's maiden name was Emily Truxtun, a daughter of Thomas Truxtun.

Modern Truxton began to grow in 1951 when a few people moved in on Route 66, just northeast of the railstop, in anticipation of the building of the proposed Bridge Canyon Dam which would be nearby and would generate commerce. Though the dam was never built, business grew from Route 66 traffic coming through the very sparsely populated area. When Interstate 40 opened in 1978 and bypassed this stretch of U.S. 66, it greatly reduced traffic and commerce in Truxton.

== Education ==
The Valentine Elementary School District, which contains Truxton, has its single K-8 school in Truxton. The school has been there since 1969, and was previously in Valentine.

== Demographics ==
Historical population
| Census | Pop. | Note | %± |
|---|---|---|---|
| 2010 | 134 | | — |
| 2020 | 104 | | −22.4% |
U.S. Decennial Census
