= Hackberry School District =

School district in Mohave County, Arizona

Hackberry School District 3

Location
- 9501 Nellie Drive; Kingman, Arizona 86401 United States

Other information
- Website: www.hesd.net

Hackberry School District 3 is a public school district based in Mohave County, Arizona.

Its sole school, a K-8 school, is called Cedar Hills Elementary School.

Most of Hackberry is in the district boundary, as well as almost all of Grand Canyon West.
