= Interstate 40 in Arizona =

Interstate Highway in Arizona

Interstate 40
- Purple Heart Trail
- I-40 highlighted in red

Route information
- Maintained by ADOT
- Length: 359.11 mi (577.93 km)
- Existed: 1960–present
- NHS: Entire route

Major junctions
- West end: I-40 at the California state line in Topock
- Future I-11 / US 93 in Kingman; SR 89 in Ash Fork; I-17 / SR 89A in Flagstaff; US 180 from Flagstaff to Holbrook; US 191 from Chambers to Sanders
- East end: I-40 at the New Mexico state line in Lupton

Location
- Country: United States
- State: Arizona
- Counties: Mohave, Yavapai, Coconino, Navajo, Apache

Highway system
- Interstate Highway System; Main; Auxiliary; Suffixed; Business; Future; Arizona State Highway System; Interstate; US; State; Scenic Proposed; Former
← SR 30	→ SR 50

Interstate 40 (I-40) is an east–west Interstate Highway that has a 359.11-mile (577.93 km) section in the US state of Arizona, connecting sections in California and New Mexico. The Interstate is also referred to as the Purple Heart Trail to honor those wounded in combat who have received the Purple Heart. It enters Arizona from the west at a crossing of the Colorado River southwest of Kingman. It travels eastward across the northern portion of the state, connecting the cities of Kingman, Seligman, Ash Fork, Williams, Flagstaff, Winslow, and Holbrook. I-40 continues into New Mexico, heading to Gallup and Albuquerque. The highway has major junctions with U.S. Route 93 (US 93; the main highway connecting Phoenix and Las Vegas, Nevada) in Kingman and again approximately 22 miles (35 km) to the east and I-17 (the freeway linking Phoenix to northern Arizona) in Flagstaff.

For the majority of its routing through Arizona, I-40 follows the historic alignment of US 66. The lone exception is a stretch between Kingman and Ash Fork where US 66 took a more northerly, less direct route that became State Route 66 (SR 66). Construction of I-40 was ongoing in the 1960s and 1970s and reached completion in 1984. With the completion of I-40 in 1984, the entire routing of US 66 had been bypassed by Interstate Highways which led to its decertification a year later in 1985.

== Route description ==
=== California to Flagstaff ===
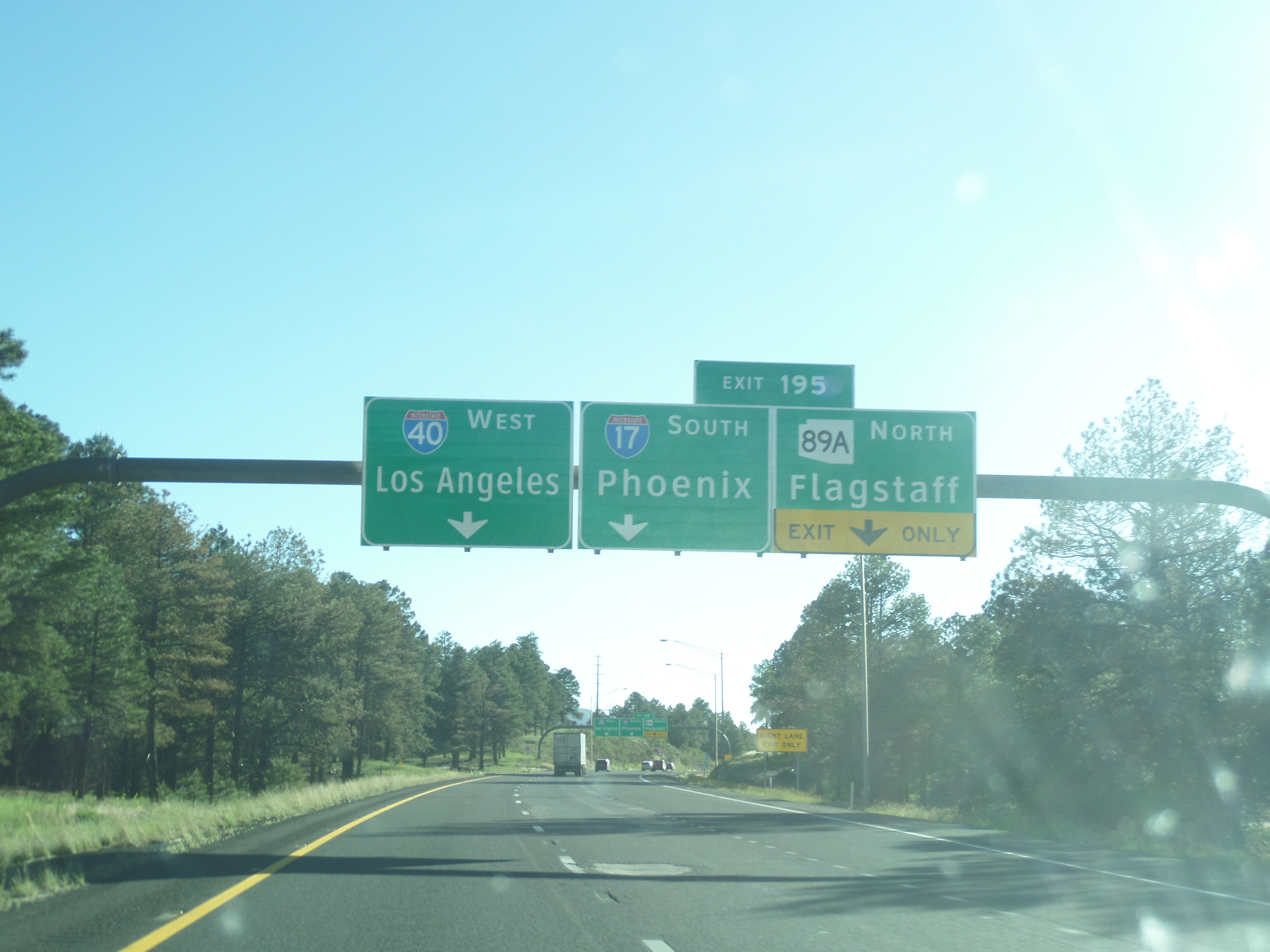
I-40 westbound toward LA, nearing the I-17 junction and exit 195 in Arizona

I-40 enters Arizona from California at a bridge that crosses the Colorado River at Topock in Mohave County. It heads east from Topock and begins to curve toward the north at Franconia, completing the curve at Yucca. The Interstate continues to head north until it reaches Kingman. In this city, I-40 has a junction with US 93 at exit 48. US 93 heads toward the northwest from this interchange to Hoover Dam and Las Vegas. US 93 south begins to run concurrently with I-40 east as they both swing eastward through Kingman. The two later separate at exit 71 as US 93 heads toward the south toward Wickenburg and Phoenix while I-40 continues east toward Flagstaff. Along the way, I-40 passes through the historic Route 66 town of Seligman, then, at Ash Fork, it meets SR 89, the former U.S. Route that heads south to Prescott. Next, it passes through Williams, where it has an interchange with SR 64 (exit 165), which heads north toward Grand Canyon National Park. I-40 continues to the east to Flagstaff, where it has a major junction with I-17 at exit 195. I-17 heads south from this interchange to Phoenix.

=== Flagstaff to New Mexico ===
East of Flagstaff, I-40 heads toward the east-southeast direction as it goes through the town of Winslow. It continues toward this direction until it reaches Holbrook, where it curves toward the northeast. Along this stretch, it passes through Petrified Forest National Park and continues to the northeast, passing through Chambers, and enters the Navajo Nation. The highway still continues to the northeast to the New Mexico border southwest of Gallup, New Mexico, as it continues on toward Albuquerque.

== History ==
National Old Trails Road
- Location: Topock–Lupton
- Length: 419 mi (674 km)
- Existed: 1914–1927

U.S. Route 66
- Length: 385.2 mi (619.9 km)
- Existed: 1926–1985

With the exception of a stretch between Kingman and Flagstaff, I-40 directly replaced the famed US 66 across northern Arizona. Where possible, US 66 was upgraded to Interstate standards to become I-40 directly. Exceptions to this were through the central business districts of the cities and towns that US 66 passed through, and I-40 had to be built as a bypass outside the cities. On October 26, 1984, after the last section of I-40 was completed in Williams, US 66 was removed from the state highway system of Arizona. The portions through cities that did not overlap I-40 would become business loops of I-40.

=== Before the U.S. Routes ===
The routing of a road near the current corridor of I-40 in Arizona was first surveyed and built between 1857 and 1859. Lt. Edward Beale and his soldiers built the road along the 35th parallel that would come to be known as the Beale Wagon Road from Fort Smith, Arkansas, to the Colorado River to serve as a military wagon road. The road was a popular route for immigrants during the 1860s and 1870s until the transcontinental railroad was built across northern Arizona in the 1880s. In the early 1900s, the road became part of the National Old Trails Road, a transcontinental route from Baltimore, Maryland, to California, and the National Park to Park Highway, an auto trail linking the national parks of the west.

=== U.S. Route 66 ===
In the 1920s, as a nationwide system of highways called the United States Numbered Highways was being developed, the route through was given the designation of US 60. This designation was controversial since designations that are multiples of 10 are assigned to transcontinental east–west routes and this route was a diagonal route from Chicago, Illinois, to Los Angeles, California. As a compromise to states east of Chicago that felt US 60 should go through their state, a different route was given the number 60, while the route from Chicago to Los Angeles was given the number 66.

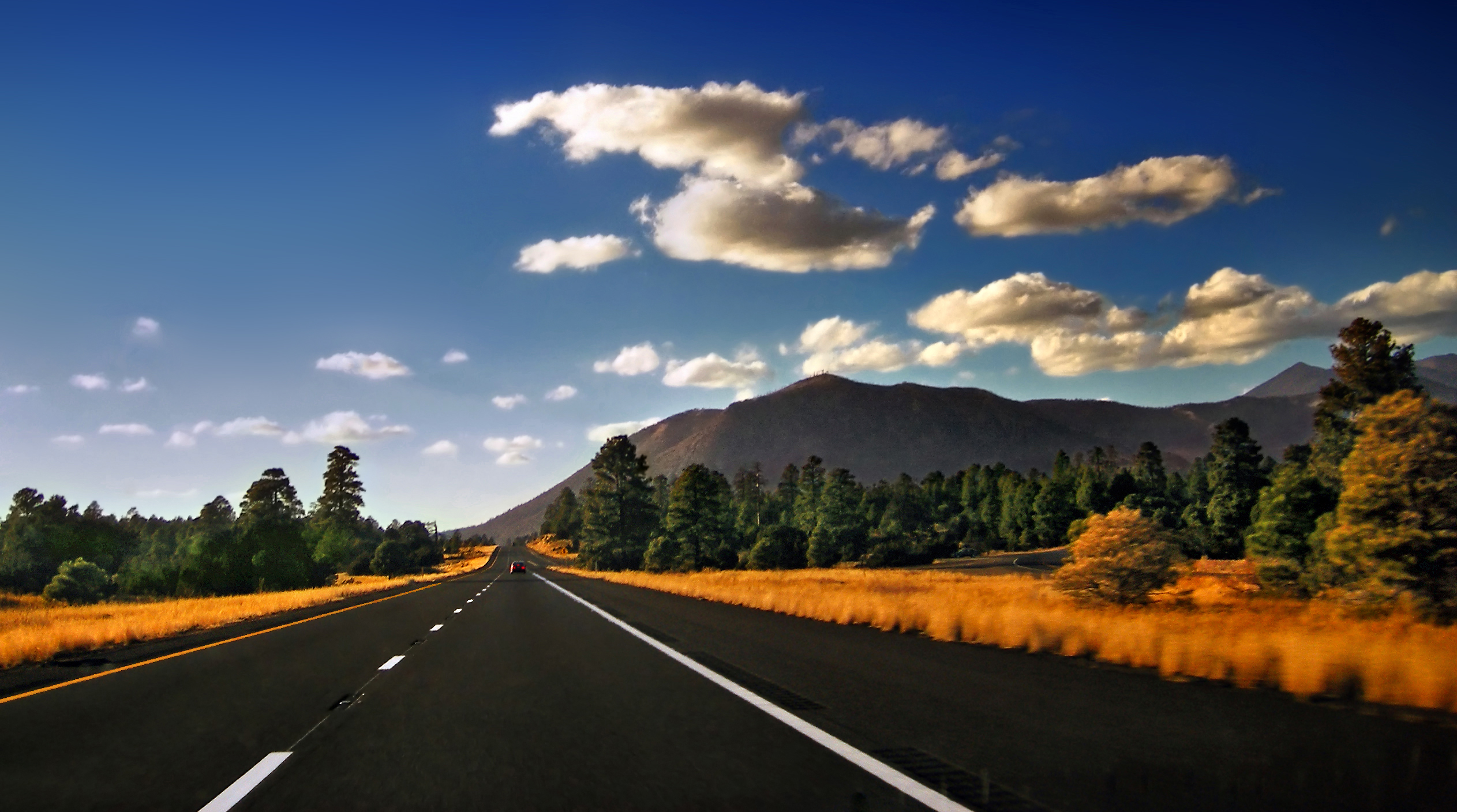
I-40 westbound heading toward Flagstaff

By 1927, the routing of US 66 through Arizona had been laid out, but none of it had been paved yet. By 1935, nearly the entire route had been paved, with the lone exceptions being a short stretch northeast of Valentine and a stretch between Peach Springs and Seligman. By 1938, the entire route in Arizona had been paved. In 1953, US 66 was realigned between the California border and Kingman to an alignment to the southeast to avoid the mountain curves and grades of the original alignment. By 1961, several sections of the highway had been expanded to a four-lane divided highway in anticipation of the coming Interstate Highway. Four-lane sections included a section near Ash Fork, another section east of Winslow, and a section east of Holbrook near the Petrified Forest National Monument.

=== Planning ===
In Flagstaff, several different alternatives were considered as a potential routing of the new Interstate through the area. The alternatives consisted of a routing north of downtown, south of downtown, through downtown along the Santa Fe Railroad right-of-way near the alignment of US 66, and a more elaborate alternative of a routing above downtown on a long overpass. In January 1959, the Flagstaff Chamber of Commerce recommended to the Bureau of Public Roads that the route south of downtown be used which was approved by the Flagstaff City Council and the Board of Supervisors for Coconino County. This recommendation was accepted and would become the planned routing of I-40 in Flagstaff. Business owners along US 66 were opposed to this routing as it would draw motorists away from main through route of the time, US 66. As a result, they created the No By-Pass Committee and sent a proposal to the Chamber of Commerce's Roads and Highways Committee to conduct a study of the feasibility of a route for I-40 through downtown along the Santa Fe railroad right-of-way. The Committee sent an inquiry to the railroad concerning the proposal. The railroad rejected the proposed rerouting of their main rail lines, citing that it would result in worse grades than what currently exists, and, in order to reduce those grades, considerable lengthening of the rail line would be required. With a routing through town now out of the question, the business owners along US 66 drafted a city ordinance, known as Initiative 200, that was filed with the city of Flagstaff in November 1959 to appear on the general election ballot in March 1960. The ordinance would, in effect, ban all new commercial businesses on I-40, all routes leading from I-40 to US 66, and the area between I-40 and US 66. In a record voter turnout, voters overwhelmingly voted against the ordinance by a vote of 2,280 to 556.

In 1965, the routing of I-40 west of Kingman was being reconsidered from the planned route through Needles, California, to a route to the north passing through Searchlight in southern Nevada and connecting with I-15 further north of its present connection with I-15. The rationale for the proposal was that it would be an overall shorter route and would cost much less to construct. The proposal was met with stiff opposition, including all four US senators from California and Arizona sending the Secretary of Commerce letters requesting that the routing through Needles be retained. This proposal was eventually abandoned in 1966, and the routing through Needles was kept.

=== Construction ===
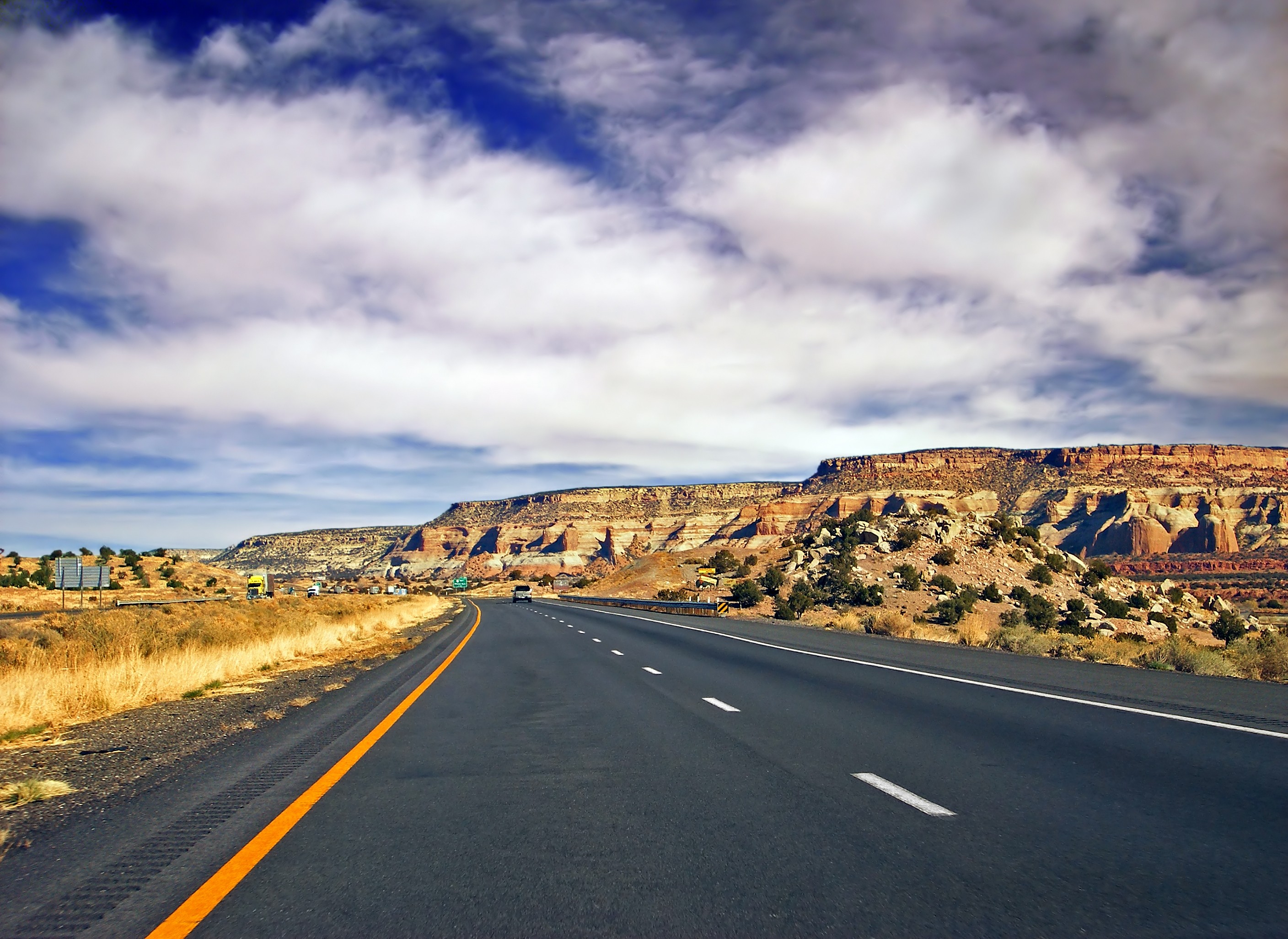
I-40 near the New Mexico border

The construction of the 360-mile (580 km) route of I-40 across Arizona took nearly 25 years to complete with the last segment being completed in 1984, much longer than the ambitious goal of finishing by 1972. By the end of 1960, 15 miles (24 km) had been completed with an additional 23 miles (37 km) being worked on. In 1964, construction was still on schedule with 58 miles (93 km) complete and an additional 71 miles (114 km) under construction. Funding was becoming an issue at this time as the state lacked the available funds to stay on pace with a 1972 completion goal. By 1967, Arizona had completed almost half of the highway with 155.3 miles (249.9 km) complete and another 82.4 miles (132.6 km) under construction. In 1968, the bypass around Flagstaff was complete with three interchanges, two at each end of where US 66 split off from I-40 to enter the city and one at the I-17 interchange. An additional interchange at Butler Avenue was completed a year later. One of the big improvements of I-40 over US 66 was the construction of the segment between Kingman and Ash Fork. The 94-mile (151 km) section is a more direct route between the two cities and travels as far as 20 miles (32 km) south of the US 66 alignment, bypassing Hackberry and Peach Springs and creating ghost-towns. Construction of the $69.1 million (equivalent to $420 million in 2025) segment was also to be a much safer route as the US 66 alignment had one of the highest fatality rates of any section of highway in Arizona. This section of the Interstate was complete in 1978. Construction of the $7.7 million (equivalent to $31.9 million in 2025) bypass around Winslow began in 1977. I-40 was completed in Arizona in 1984, with the completion of a six-mile (9.7 km) section in Williams. This was also the last section of US 66 to be bypassed by the Interstate, which led to it being decertified by the American Association of State Highway and Transportation Officials (AASHTO) the following year.

== Exit list ==
County	Location	mi	km	Exit	Destinations	Notes
Colorado River		0.00	0.00		I-40 west (Needles Freeway) – Needles, Barstow, Los Angeles	Continuation into California
Colorado River		0.00	0.00	Arizona–California line		
Mohave		0.55	0.89	1	Historic US 66 east (Oatman Highway) – Golden Shores, Oatman	To SR 95 north
Mohave		2.99	4.81	2	Needle Mountain Road	
Mohave		9.79	15.76	9	SR 95 south – Lake Havasu City, Parker	
Mohave		13.16	21.18	13	Franconia Road	
Mohave		20.14	32.41	20	Santa Fe Ranch Road	
Mohave	Yucca	25.19	40.54	25	Alamo Road	No eastbound entrance
Mohave	Yucca	26.18	42.13	26	Proving Ground Road	No westbound entrance
Mohave		28.75	46.27	28	Old Trails Road	
Mohave		37.03	59.59	37	Griffith Road	
Mohave	McConnico	44.32	71.33	44	Historic US 66 (Shinarump Drive) – McConnico, Walnut Creek, Oatman	Former US 66
Mohave	Kingman	48.86	78.63	48	US 93 north (Beale Street) to SR 68 west – Las Vegas	Current western end of US 93 concurrency; Beale Street was formerly part of BL 40 east/US 466
Mohave	Kingman	49.00	78.86	49	Future I-11 north / US 93 north to SR 68 west – Las Vegas	Semi-directional T interchange under construction; future western end of US 93 concurrency; westbound exit and eastbound entrance; eastbound exit and westbound entrance will be built in the future
Mohave	Kingman	51.69	83.19	51	Stockton Hill Road	
Mohave	Kingman	53.07	85.41	53	SR 66 / Historic US 66 (Andy Devine Avenue) – Kingman Airport	Former BL 40 west/US 66
Mohave	Kingman	56.00	90.12	56	Flying Fortress Parkway – Kingman Airport	Interchange opened on October 5, 2026
Mohave		59.21	95.29	59	CR 259 (DW Ranch Road)	
Mohave		66.02	106.25	66	Blake Ranch Road	
Mohave		71.52	115.10	71	Future I-11 south / US 93 south – Wickenburg, Phoenix	Eastern end of US 93 concurrency
Mohave		78.90	126.98	79	Silver Springs Road	
Mohave		87.01	140.03	87	Willows Ranch Road	
Mohave		91.12	146.64	91	Fort Rock Road	
Yavapai		95.45	153.61	96	Cross Mountain Road	
Yavapai		102.99	165.75	103	Jolly Road	
Yavapai		109.07	175.53	109	Anvil Rock Road	
Yavapai	Seligman	120.49	193.91	121	BL 40 east to SR 66 / Historic US 66 – Seligman, Peach Springs	Former US 66 east
Yavapai	Seligman	122.72	197.50	123	BL 40 west to SR 66 / Historic US 66 – Seligman, Peach Springs	Former US 66 west
Yavapai		139.28	224.15	139	Historic US 66 west (Crookton Road)	Former US 66 west
Yavapai	Ash Fork	144.37	232.34	144	BL 40 east / Historic US 66 east – Ash Fork	Former US 66 east
Yavapai	Ash Fork	145.69	234.47	146	SR 89 south / BL 40 west / Historic US 66 west – Prescott, Ash Fork	Former US 66 west/US 89 south
Coconino		147.68	237.67	148	County Line Road	
Coconino		148.57	239.10	149	Monte Carlo Road	
Coconino		151.23	243.38	151	Welch Road	
Coconino		157.20	252.99	157	Devil Dog Road	
Coconino	Williams	161.38	259.72	161	BL 40 east / Historic US 66 east – Williams, Grand Canyon	Former US 66 east/US 89 north
Coconino	Williams	162.95	262.24	163	Williams, Grand Canyon	
Coconino	Williams	165.41	266.20	165	BL 40 west / Historic US 66 west / SR 64 north – Williams, Grand Canyon	BL 40 was formerly part of US 66 west/US 89 south
Coconino	Williams	167.09	268.91	167	Garland Prairie Road / Circle Pines Road	
Coconino	Parks	171.10	275.36	171	Deer Farm Road (CR 146) / Pittman Valley Road	
Coconino	Parks	177.81	286.16	178	Parks Road	
Coconino	Bellemont	183.66	295.57	184	Camp Navajo	Proposed interchange
Coconino	Bellemont	184.68	297.21	185	Hughes Avenue – Bellemont	Formerly Transwestern Road
Coconino		190.10	305.94	190	A-1 Mountain Road	
Coconino		191.26	307.80	191	BL 40 east / Historic US 66 east	Former US 66 east/US 89 north; access to United States Naval Observatory Flagstaff Station
Coconino		192.12	309.19	192	Flagstaff Ranch Road	
Coconino	Flagstaff	193.47	311.36	194	Woody Mountain Road	Proposed interchange
Coconino	Flagstaff	194.63– 195.25	313.23– 314.22	195	I-17 south / SR 89A to US 180 – Sedona, Phoenix, Flagstaff, Grand Canyon	I-17 exits 340A–B; northern terminus of I-17; SR 89A was formerly part of SR 79
Coconino	Flagstaff	196.70	316.56	197	Lone Tree Road	Proposed interchange on new alignment east of current Lone Tree Road underpass
Coconino	Flagstaff	197.86	318.42	198	Butler Avenue	
Coconino	Flagstaff	200.65	322.91	201	BL 40 west / US 180 west (Country Club Drive) to US 89 north – Flagstaff, Page	Western end of US 180 concurrency; eastbound exit signed as US 89 north – Page
Coconino	Flagstaff	204.42	328.98	204	Historic US 66 west – Walnut Canyon National Monument	Former US 66 west; Walnut Canyon National Monument access via former SR 166
Coconino		206.79	332.80	207	Cosnino Road (CR 510C)	
Coconino		210.72	339.12	211	Winona	Access via CR 510
Coconino		219.13	352.66	219	Twin Arrows	
Coconino		224.60	361.46	225	Buffalo Range Road	
Coconino		230.01	370.17	230	Two Guns	
Coconino		233.43	375.67	233	Meteor Crater Road	Access to Meteor Crater
Coconino		239.22	384.99	239	Meteor City Road	
Coconino		244.94	394.19	245	SR 99 north – Leupp	Western end of SR 99 concurrency
Navajo	Winslow	251.58	404.88	252	BS 40 west / SR 99 south / Historic US 66 (Hipkoe Drive)	Eastern end of SR 99 concurrency; former BL 40 east
Navajo	Winslow	253.08	407.29	253	N. Park Drive	
Navajo	Winslow	255.21	410.72	255	Transcon Lane	Former BL 40 west
Navajo		257.16	413.86	257	SR 87 south / Historic US 66 east – Payson, Second Mesa	
Navajo		264.18	425.16	264	Hibbard Road	
Navajo		269.43	433.61	269	Jackrabbit Road	
Navajo	Joseph City	274.19	441.27	274	BL 40 east / Historic US 66 east – Joseph City	Former US 66 east
Navajo	Joseph City	276.55	445.06	277	BL 40 west / Historic US 66 west – Joseph City	Former US 66 west
Navajo		280.13	450.83	280	Hunt Road / Geronimo Road	
Navajo	Holbrook	283.13	455.65	283	Perkins Valley Road	
Navajo	Holbrook	284.67	458.13	285	BL 40 east / US 180 east / Historic US 66 east (Hopi Drive) to SR 77 south – Show Low, Petrified Forest National Park	Eastern end of US 180 concurrency; westbound exit signed as BL 40 (Hopi Drive); former US 66 east
Navajo	Holbrook	286.38	460.88	286	BL 40 (Navajo Boulevard) / SR 77 south to US 180 east / SR 377 south – Show Low, Heber	Western end of SR 77 concurrency; Historic US 66 is unsigned at this exit; former US 66
Navajo	Holbrook	289.00	465.10	289	BL 40 west / Historic US 66 west (Navajo Boulevard)	Former US 66 west
Navajo		292.32	470.44	292	SR 77 north – Indian Wells	Eastern end of SR 77 concurrency
Navajo		294.03	473.20	294	Sun Valley Road	
Navajo		299.67	482.27	300	Goodwater	
Navajo		303.09	487.78	303	Adamana Road	
Apache	Petrified Forest NP	311.06	500.60	311	Petrified Forest National Park	
Apache		319.49	514.17	320	Pinta Road	
Apache		325.41	523.70	325	Navajo	
Apache		329.49	530.26	330	McCarrell Road	
Apache	Chambers	333.04	535.98	333	US 191 north – Ganado	Western end of US 191 concurrency; former SR 63
Apache	Sanders	339.00	545.57	339	US 191 south – St. Johns	Eastern end of US 191 concurrency; former US 666 south
Apache		341.33	549.32	341	Ortega Road	
Apache		343.32	552.52	343	Querino Road	
Apache		346.05	556.91	346	Pine Springs Road	
Apache		347.65	559.49	348	St. Anselm Road – Houck	
Apache		350.85	564.64	351	Allentown Road	
Apache		354.11	569.88	354	Hawthorne Road	
Apache		357.02	574.57	357	BIA Route 12 north – Window Rock	
Apache	Lupton	358.69	577.26	359	Grants Road – Rest Area	Former US 66 east; Rest Area not signed eastbound
Apache		359.11	577.93		I-40 east – Albuquerque	Continuation into New Mexico; former US 666 north
1.000 mi = 1.609 km; 1.000 km = 0.621 mi: Concurrency terminus; Incomplete access; Unopened

== See also ==
Interstate 40
Previous state: California	Arizona	Next state: New Mexico
