= Hackberry, Arizona =

Unincorporated community in the state of Arizona, United States

- Census-designated place
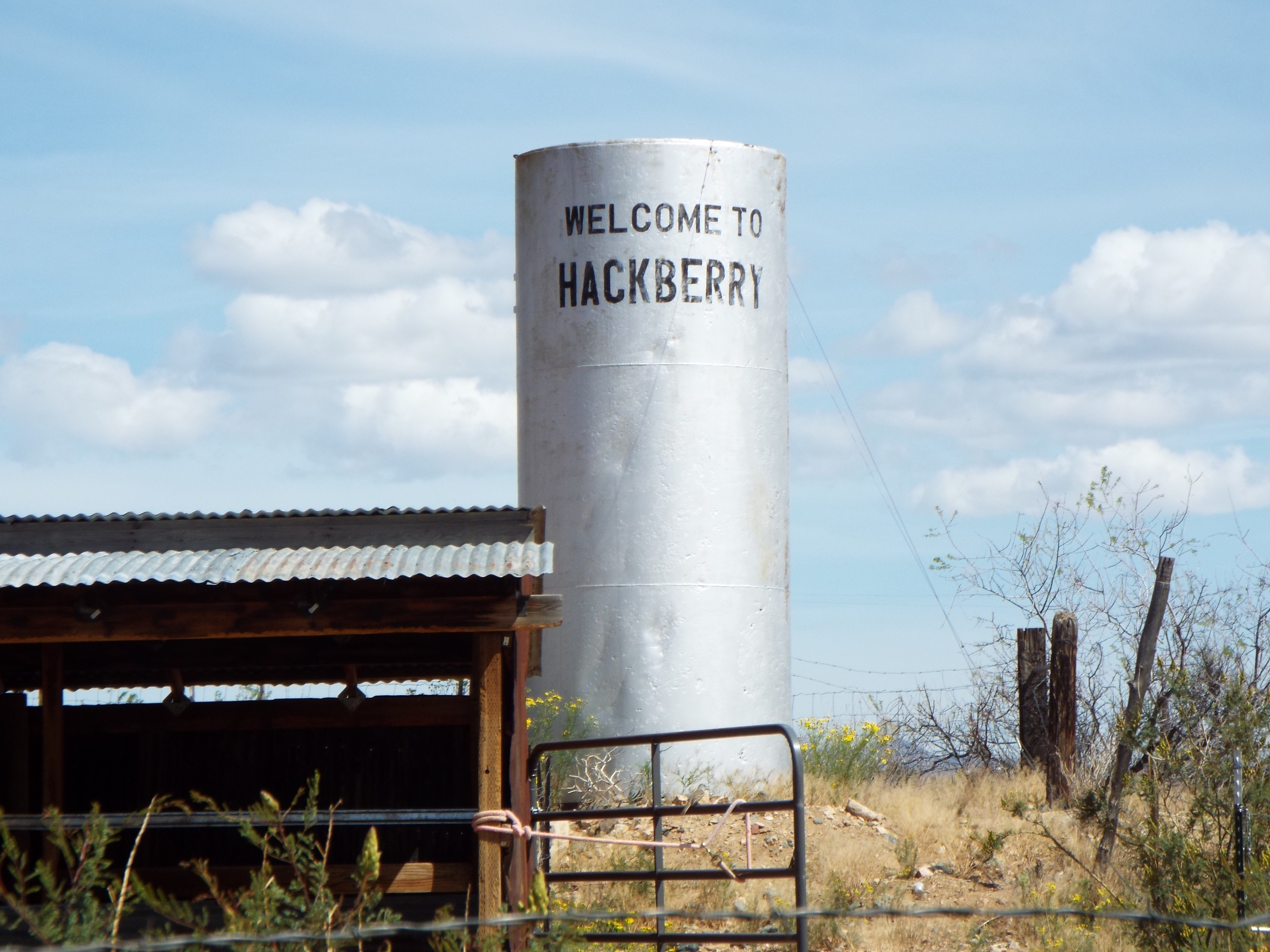
- Welcome to Hackberry

- Location in Mohave County, Arizona

- Location within Arizona Location within the United States
- Coordinates: 35°21′20″N 113°44′24″W
- Country: United States
- State: Arizona
- County: Mohave
- Founded: 1874

Area
  - Total: 17.59 sq mi (45.56 km^{2})
  - Land: 17.59 sq mi (45.56 km^{2})
  - Water: 0 sq mi (0.00 km^{2})
- Elevation: 4,023 ft (1,226 m)

Population (2020)
  - Total: 103
  - Density: 5.9/sq mi (2.26/km^{2})
- Time zone: UTC-7 (Mountain (MST))
- ZIP code: 86411
- Area code: 928
- GNIS feature ID: 2582794
- FIPS code: 04-30830

Hackberry is an unincorporated community and census-designated place (CDP) in Mohave County, Arizona, United States. It is located on State Route 66 (former U.S. Route 66), 28 miles (45 km) northeast of Kingman. Hackberry once had a post office; as of 2015, the US Postal Service served 68 residential mailboxes in the town with ZIP code 86411. As of the 2020 census, Hackberry had a population of 103.

== History ==
A former mining town, Hackberry takes its name from the Hackberry Mine which was named for a hackberry tree in a nearby spring.

Prospector Jim Music helped develop the Hackberry Silver Mine in 1875. Mining of various metals developed the town, sending it from boom to bust based on fluctuating commodity prices.

The Indianapolis Monroes Iron Clad Age of June 12, 1886, includes a brief article titled "They Changed the Minds of Several", referring to an educated miner from the area:

"J.J. Watts writes from Hackberry, Arizona: 'The books you sent me last year have changed the minds of several to whom I loaned them. It is a pity that liberal books and papers cannot be more generally circulated and read. If they could be we should soon have more outspoken, honest men that would dare to speak their true sentiments.'"

Based on an article taken from the July 24, 1909, edition of the Mohave County Miner out of Kingman, Arizona, J.J. Watts was an old prospector. Here is that article.

"Some time ago the report was current in Kingman that Indians had killed an old prospector, in the Wallapai mountains, first burying the body and later burning up everything of an incriminating nature. The man was supposed to be J. J. Watts, who mined and prospected in the Music mountain range many years. William Grant, the Hackberry merchant, this week received a letter from B.F. Watts, of Marshall, Oklahoma, conveying the information that J.J. Watts died at Lander, Wyoming, last winter. The man who was killed by the Indians is believed to be a stranger that came to Kingman and was lured to the mountains by the Indians by a story of a lost mine that they had found in that section. The man was killed by Willietopsy and his sons, so it is reported by the other Indians."

By 1919, infighting between the mine's owners had become litigation, and the ore was beginning to be depleted. The mine closed; Hackberry briefly almost became a ghost town.

Various service stations in town served U.S. Route 66 travelers after the highway came to town in 1926; all were shut down after Interstate 40 bypassed the town. I-40's 69-mile (111 km) path between Kingman and Seligman diverges widely from the old 82-mile (132 km) segment of State Route 66 between these points, leaving Hackberry stranded 16 miles (26 km) from the new highway. Hackberry Road would not even be given an off-ramp. John Grigg operated a Union 76 service station on Route 66 in Hackberry from the 1920s until his death in 1967. The Northside Grocery (established 1934) and its Conoco station were among the last to close, in 1978.

Hackberry almost became a ghost town again, but members of the Grigg family have lived there since the 1890s and continue to live there. Six generations of the Grigg family are buried in the Hackberry cemetery.

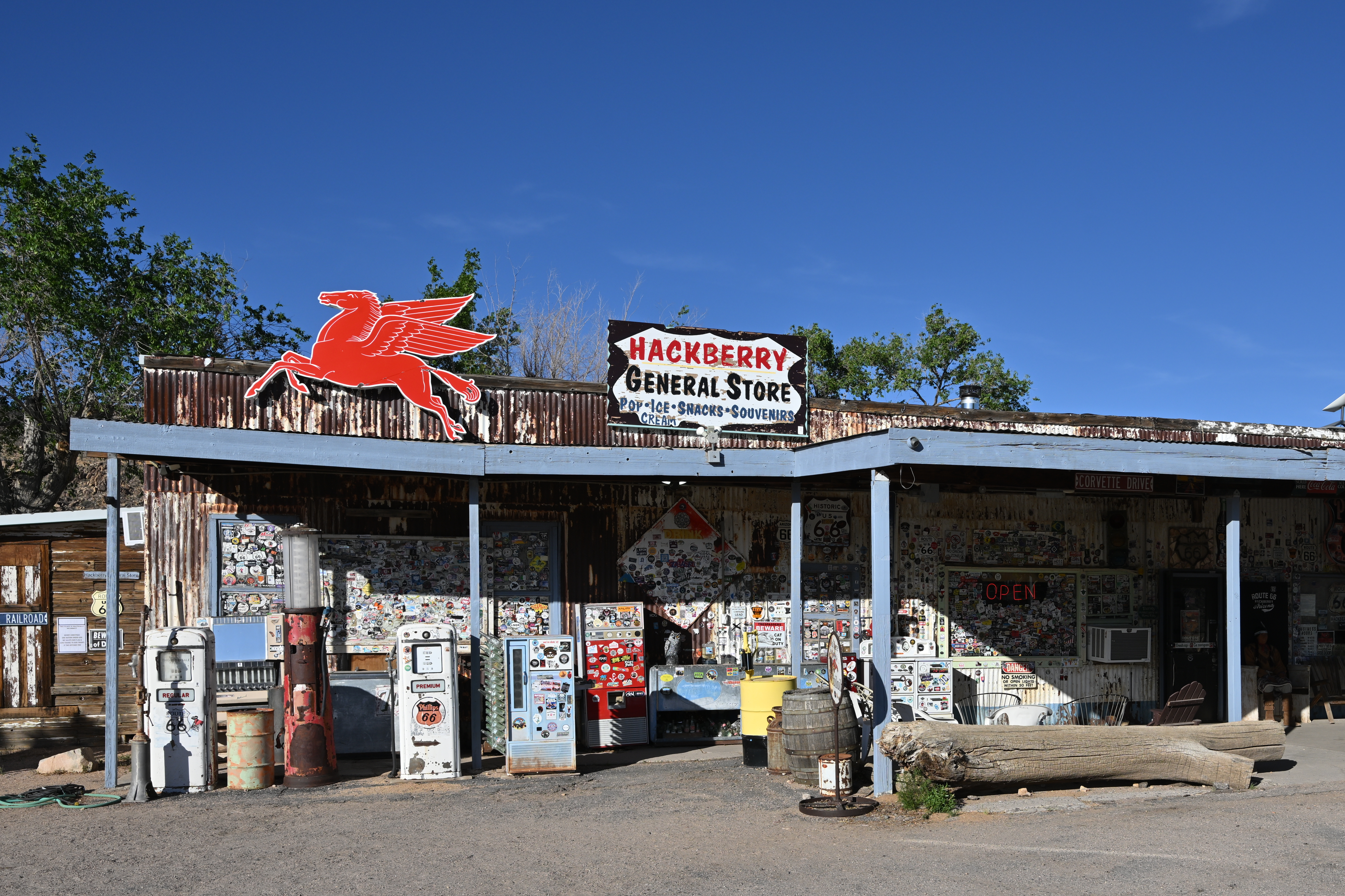
Hackberry General Store

In 1992, itinerant artist Bob Waldmire re-opened the Hackberry General Store as a Route 66 tourism information post and souvenir shop on the former Northside Grocery site.

Waldmire sold the store to John and Kerry Pritchard in 1998 due to local disputes regarding the environmental and aesthetic impact of quarries, which by that time were establishing themselves in the area to remove local stone for use in landscaping.

The store remains in operation with a collection of vintage cars from the heyday of U.S. Route 66 in Arizona; in 2008, its owners donated land for a new fire hall to be built for the community.

== Geography ==
Hackberry is in eastern Mohave County along SR 66, 28 miles (45 km) northeast of Kingman, the county seat, and 60 miles (97 km) west of Seligman. Hackberry Road runs south from the town, leading 21 miles (34 km) to U.S. Route 93 south of Interstate 40.

According to the U.S. Census Bureau, the Hackberry CDP has an area of 17.6 square miles (46 km^{2}), all land. The town sits at the west end of Truxton Canyon, followed by Route 66 as it climbs to the east. Truxton Wash flows northwest into the endorheic Hualapai Valley, ending at Red Lake 27 miles (43 km) from Hackberry.

== Demographics ==
Historical population
Census	Pop.	Note	%±
2010	68		—
2020	103		51.5%
U.S. Decennial Census

== Education ==
Most of the CDP is in the Hackberry School District. A portion of the CDP is in the Valentine Elementary School District.

== See also ==
- Bullhead City, Arizona
- Fort Mohave, Arizona
- Mohave Valley, Arizona
- Yucca, Arizona
- Santa Claus, Arizona
