= Seligman High School =

Coordinates: 35°19′48″N 112°52′27″W

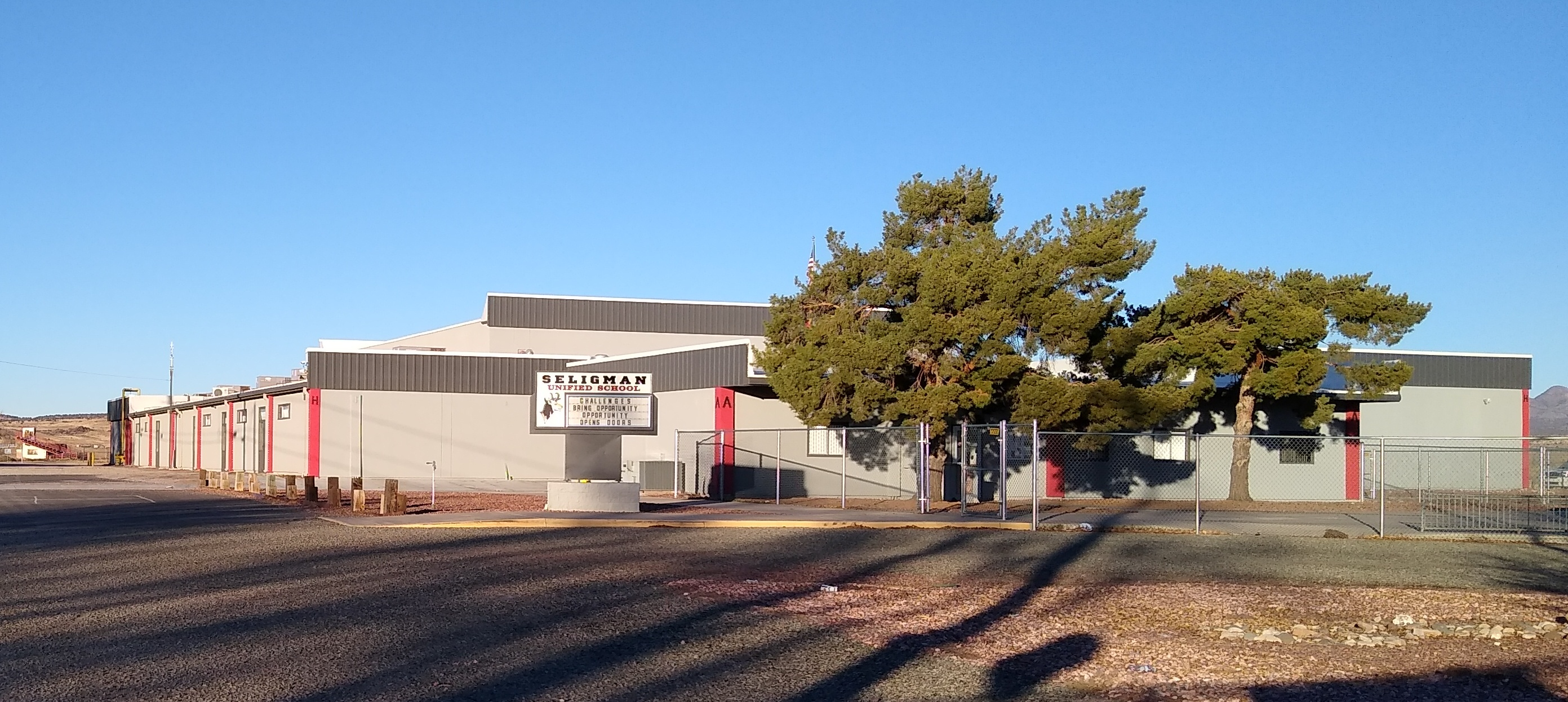
- Seligman Unified School

Location
- 500 N. Main Street; Seligman, Arizona 86337; United States

Information
- School type: Public high school
- School district: Seligman Unified School District
- Superintendent: Wanda Burton
- CEEB code: 030415
- Principal: Kelly Robison
- Teaching staff: 4.00 (FTE)
- Grades: 9–12
- Enrollment: 57 (2023–2024)
- Student to teacher ratio: 14.25
- Colors: Red, black, and white
- Mascot: Antelope
- Website: www.seligmanschools.org

Seligman High School is a high school in Seligman, Arizona. It is the only high school in the Seligman Unified School District, which also includes an elementary school. Schools in the district operate on a four-day school week.

Since 2008 Peach Springs Unified School District of Peach Springs sends its high school students to other districts, one of them Seligman USD. Previously Peach Springs operated its own high school, Music Mountain Junior/Senior High School.

== Notable alumni ==
- Angel Delgadillo American barber and businessowner dubbed the "guardian angel" of U.S. Route 66
