= Seligman Unified School District =

School district in Mohave County, Arizona

Address
- 54255 N. Main Street Seligman, Arizona, 86337; United States

District information
- Type: Public
- Grades: PreK–12
- NCES District ID: 0407630

Students and staff
- Students: 104
- Teachers: 13.02
- Staff: 23.0
- Student–teacher ratio: 7.99

Other information
- Website: www.seligmanschools.org

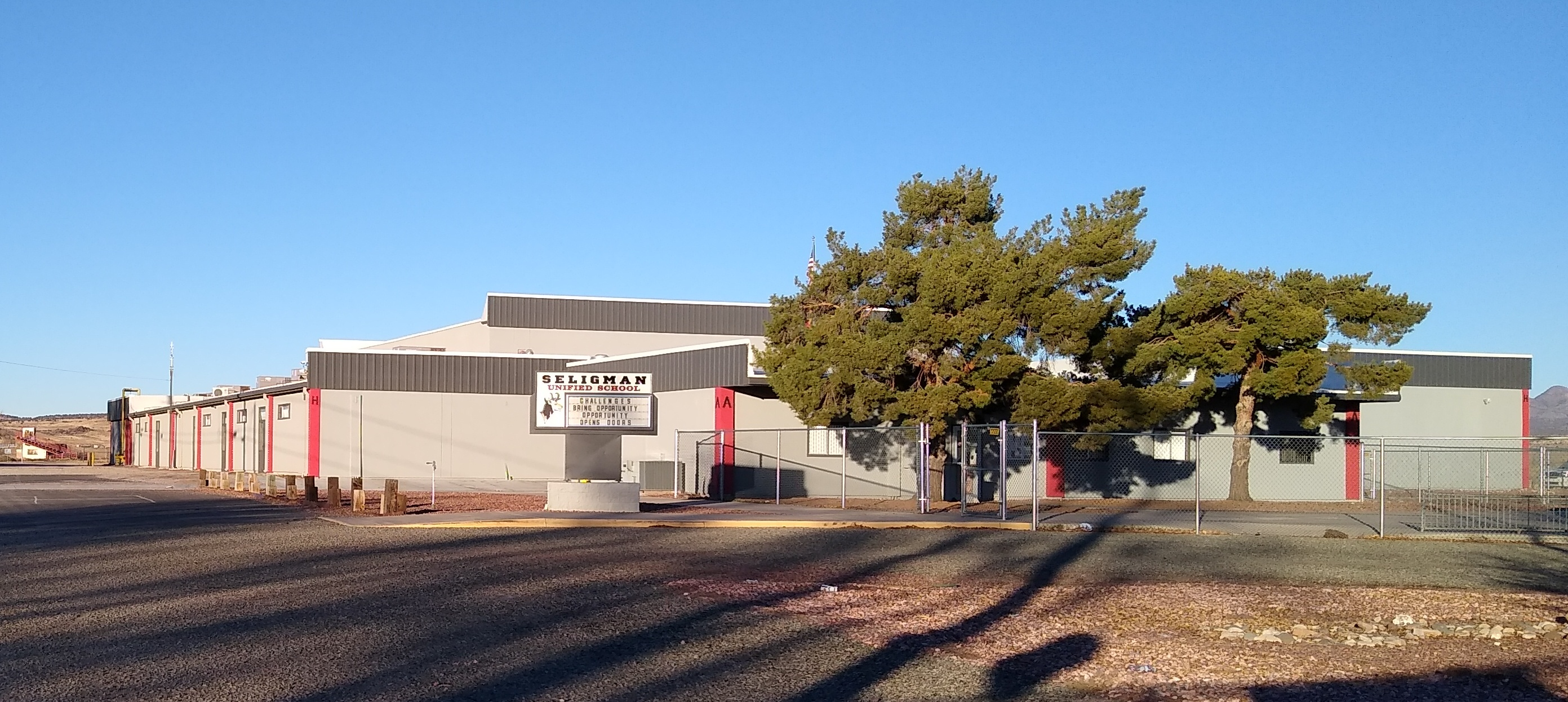
Seligman Unified School

Seligman Unified School District is a school district headquartered in Seligman, Arizona. It includes Seligman Elementary School and Seligman High School.

Since 2008 Peach Springs Unified School District of Peach Springs sends its high school students to other districts, one of them Seligman USD. Previously Peach Springs operated its own high school, Music Mountain Junior/Senior High School.

== History ==
In 1972 the school district leadership stated that it was about to run out of the $230,000 annual budget and that the district's finances were in jeopardy, although the district leadership did not plan to close any schools.

In 1974 the district sold Farmers Home Administration bonds so its operating expenses could be reduced. It sold $1,100,000 worth of such bonds.

In 1984 its student body count was 154, and it had 12 faculty working full time as teachers. That year the district leadership attempted to convince voters to pass a "district override" as the state funding rules made it more difficult to operate its schools at the optimum level. The vote succeeded at 109-37. The override was worth $119,000.
