= Route 66 Association =

U.S. non-profit organizations

U.S. Route 66

Route 66 Association is the generic name of the non-profit associations established for preservation, restoration and promotion of the historic U.S. Route 66. They exist in all eight Route 66 states: Illinois, Missouri, Kansas, Oklahoma, Texas, New Mexico, Arizona and California.

The first Route 66 Association was established on U.S. Route 66 in Arizona by businessman Angel Delgadillo. An initial meeting of 15 people on February 18, 1987, in Seligman led to efforts which yielded a state-issued "Historic Route 66" designation for a portion of former Route 66 between Kingman and Seligman later that year. By 1990, similar organizations had been established in all eight U.S. Route 66 states.

== California Historic Route 66 Association ==
The California Historic Route 66 Association is the youngest of the eight, established in December 1990 and dedicated to the U.S. Route 66 in California. It previously published a quarterly newsletter Roadsigns, which includes various news and history related to Route 66 in California, among other things. It published the Guide to Historic Route 66 in California, a travel guide with maps, directions, mileage, photos, and other travel information.

== Historic Route 66 Association of Arizona ==
The route sign, 1926–1948

The Historic Route 66 Association of Arizona was established in February 1987 and dedicated to the U.S. Route 66 in Arizona. The Arizona association was instrumental in making the Seligman-Kingman stretch of Route 66 to be officially recognized as "Historic Route 66" later that year, a designation subsequently extended to the whole Route 66 in Arizona.

Seligman businessman Angel Delgadillo was a key early advocate both of the creation of this Route 66 association and of the introduction of the "Historic Route 66" designation and signage.

== New Mexico Route 66 Association ==
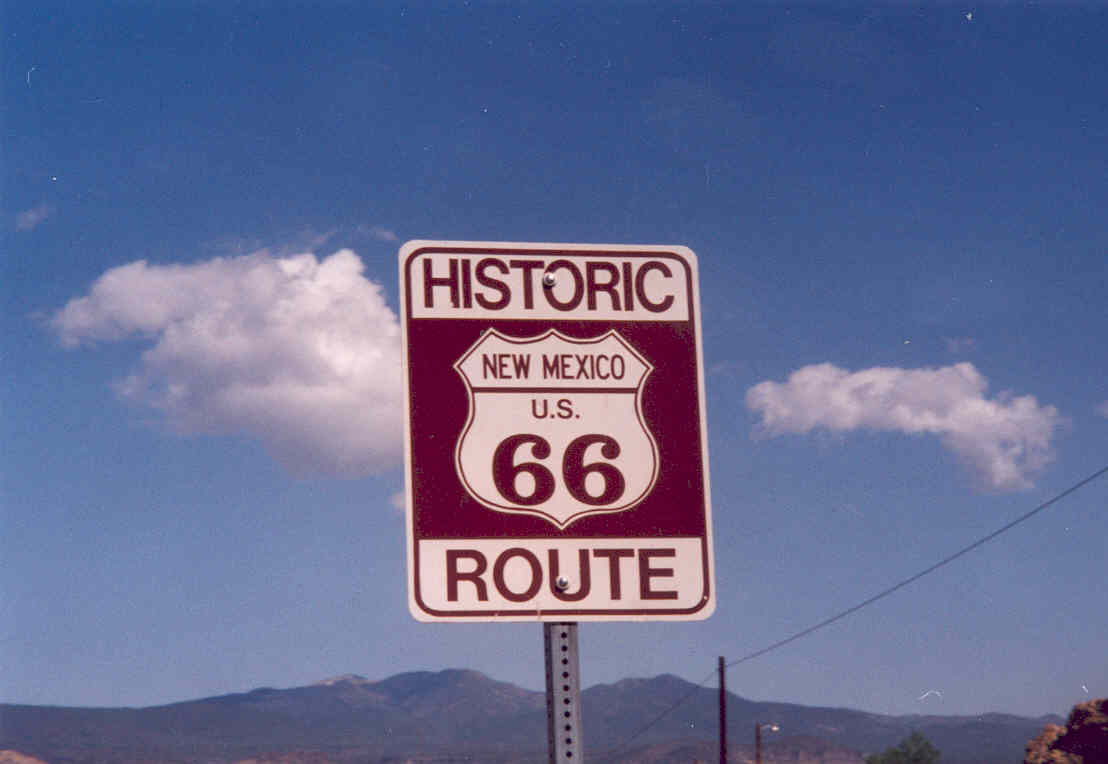
Modern-day sign in New Mexico

The New Mexico Route 66 Association is dedicated to the education, promotion and preservation of Historic Route 66 in New Mexico.

== Texas Old Route 66 Association ==
The Texas Old Route 66 Association, dedicated to the U.S. Route 66 in Texas, was incorporated in 1991. It publishes the Texas Route 66 Newsletter quarterly and maintains the Texas Route 66 Exhibit, the first Route 66 museum on the route, among other activities.

== Oklahoma Route 66 Association ==
The Oklahoma Route 66 Association, organized in 1989, is dedicated to the U.S. Route 66 in Oklahoma. It publishes a quarterly newsletter and the Official Oklahoma Route 66 Association Trip Guide.

== Kansas Historic Route 66 Association ==
The Kansas Historic Route 66 Association, founded in 1990, is dedicated to promoting, protecting, and preserving the 13.2 mile stretch of U.S. Route 66 in Kansas.

== Route 66 Association of Missouri ==
The Route 66 Association of Missouri was organized in 1989 (a 501(c)(3) non-profit corporation since January 13, 1990) is dedicated to the U.S. Route 66 in Missouri. The association publishes the quarterly newsletter, Show Me Route 66, which describes various projects associated with Route 66.

== Route 66 Association of Illinois ==
The Route 66 Association of Illinois, a 501(c)(3) non-profit corporation, is dedicated to U.S. Route 66 in Illinois. Initiated in March 1989, it was incorporated in October 1989 in Dwight, Illinois, and currently has Pontiac, Illinois, where the free Route 66 Association Hall of Fame and Museum is located, as its home base. The association publishes a quarterly magazine for its members, The 66 News, which is available in both print and digital formats and has been published since before official incorporation in 1989. The association meets quarterly at various locations along the Route, with annual elections held every October.

The association holds an annual Motor Tour, alternating directions every year, typically during the second weekend of June. In the past, these tours have included crossings of the iconic Old Chain of Rocks Bridge. The Motor Tour includes a banquet honoring its Hall of Fame members.

== National Historic Route 66 Federation ==
Founded in 1995, the National Historic Route 66 Federation publishes the "Route 66 Dining & Lodging Guide (since 1999, currently including over 500 mostly vintage businesses) and a 200-page EZ66 Guide For Travelers" (since 2005). With a stated objective of bringing Route 66 historians, authors, artists, photographers, business people and enthusiasts with citizens within U.S. Route 66 host communities, the federation presents an annual "John Steinbeck Award" to an individual who had contributed significantly to the preservation of Route 66 and organizes an "Adopt-A-Hundred" program in which adopters watch 100-mile segments for possible preservation problems along the route such as bridges, businesses or stretches of roadbed being closed. These same adopters were to review the dining and lodging businesses while they traveled.

The National Historic Route 66 Federation is working with the National Route 66 Corridor Preservation Program to issue $10 million in matching fund grants under the National Route 66 Preservation Bill (1999) to individuals, corporations and communities preserving or restoring historic properties along the historic route.
