= Angel Delgadillo =

Promoter of US Route 66 in Arizona

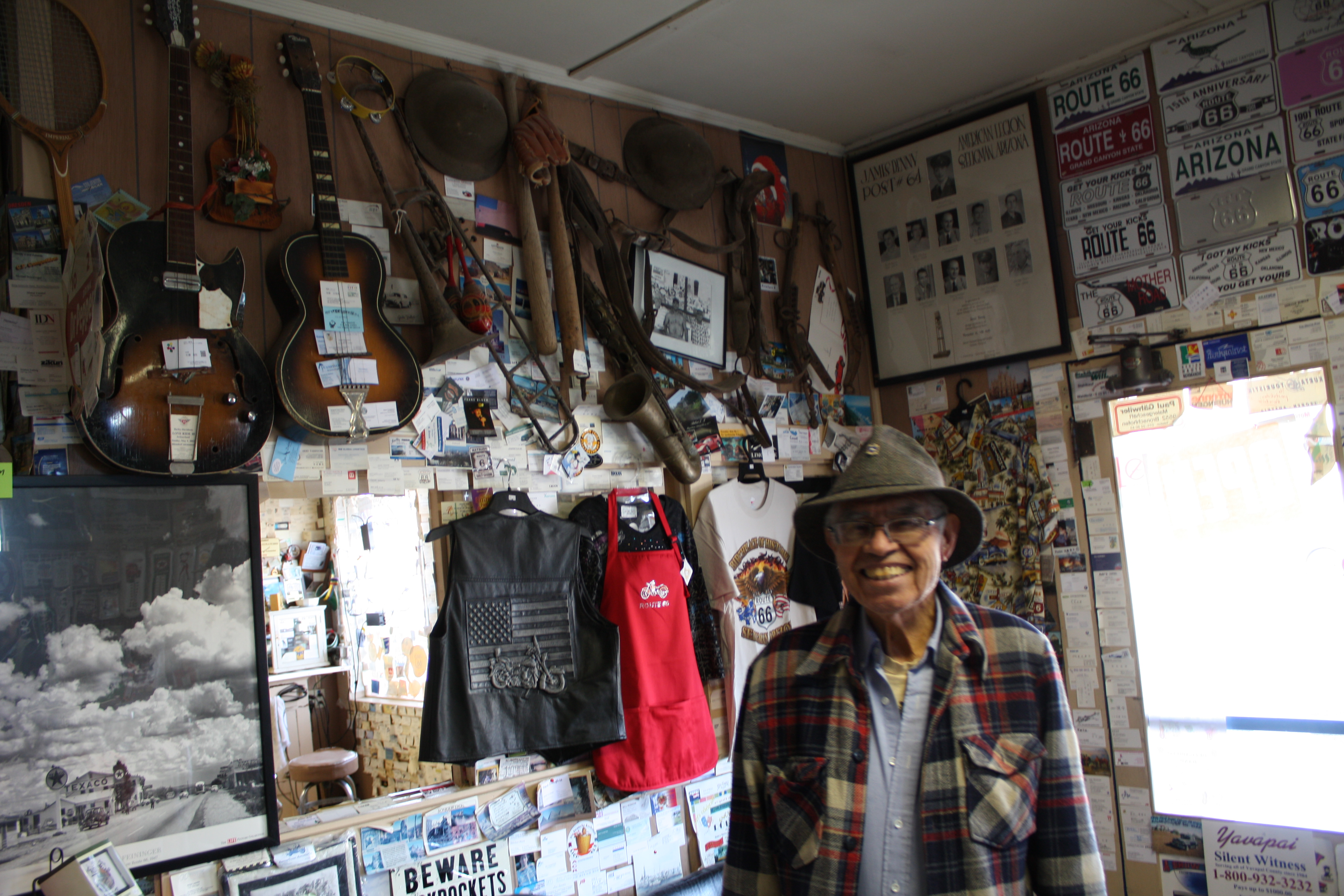
- Angel and Vilma's shop on US 66
- Born: April 19, 1927 (age 99); Seligman, Arizona, U.S.
- Education: Seligman High School; American Barber College (Pasadena, California)
- Occupations: Barber, merchant
- Years active: 1950–2022
- Known for: Founder of Historic Route 66 Association of Arizona
- Spouse: Vilma Delgadillo
- Awards: John Steinbeck Award; Will Rogers Preservation Award; 2003 Arizona Culturekeeper (Arizona Historical Foundation)

Angel Delgadillo (born April 19, 1927) is an American barber and businessowner in Seligman, Arizona who has been dubbed the "guardian angel" of U.S. Route 66. He is the main founder of the Historic Route 66 Association of Arizona, established in 1987 to campaign for "Historic Route 66" signage on the former US highway; similar initiatives have since been established in every U.S. Route 66 state.

Over the years, multiple guidebooks and websites from the United States and the Czech Republic that give information on the road have mentioned him. His late brother Juan operated a Seligman restaurant, Delgadillo's Snow Cap Drive-In.

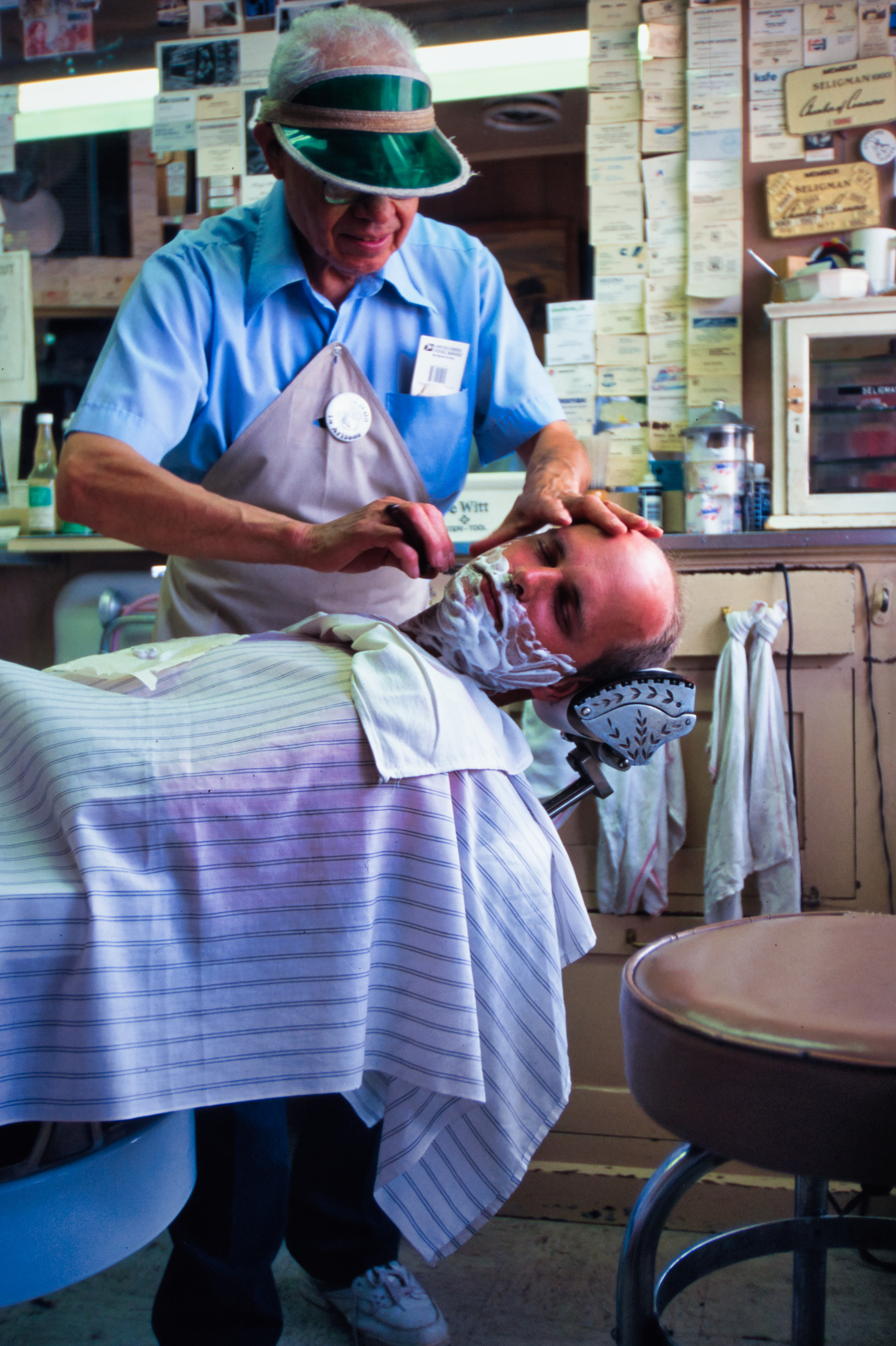
1995 picture of barber Angel Delgadillo, shaving a client in his shop in Seligman.

== Biography ==
Delgadillo was born on April 19, 1927, along US 66 in Seligman, Arizona. He witnessed the exodus of Okies due to the Dust Bowl in the 1930s, the movement of men and materials during World War II, and the rise and fall of the road. In 1947, he graduated from Seligman High School. As an adult, he ran a barbershop in town (founded May 22, 1950) and opened a souvenir shop inside his business, along the historic road.

After the decline and eventual delisting of the route from the United States Highway System in 1985, he went on to found the Historic Route 66 Association of Arizona. Eventually, route 66 associations were founded in all eight US 66 states with a similar goal: preserving the once-important road.

While researching the history of Route 66 for the 2006 Pixar motion picture Cars, John Lasseter met Delgadillo, who told him how traffic through the town virtually disappeared on the day that nearby Interstate 40 opened. In the film, Sally Carrera (an animated gynomorphic Porsche 996 motorcar) serves as a vehicle to deliver that message in a 3½ minute flashback in which the town and the US Highway vanish literally from the map. It has been said that Delgadillo helped to inspire the movie through his passion for the road and receives a thanks in the movie’s end credits.

Over the years, he has become an attraction along the road with people stopping to talk to him and coming from all over the world just to meet him. When the Associated Press was interviewing him, he met with tourists from Europe and Asia.

For his work in promoting Route 66, Delgadillo has been called "The Father of the Mother Road," "The Guardian Angel of Route 66," and "The Ambassador." Angel's story has been immortalized in the song "Angel Delgadillo", written by former Kingston Trio member John Stewart on his album "Rough Sketches".
