= Seligman, Arizona =

CDP in Yavapai County, Arizona

- CDP
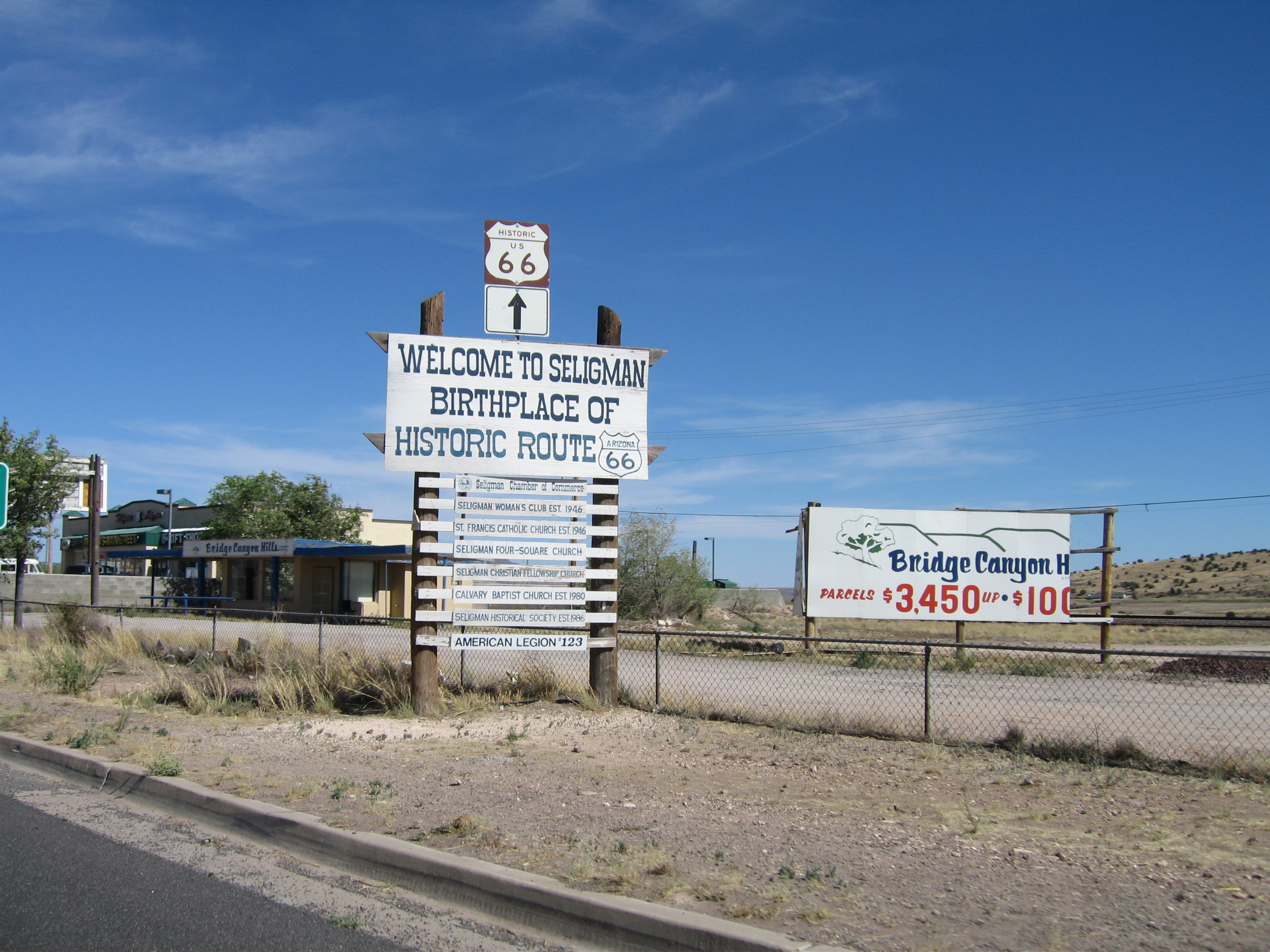
- Welcome sign

- Location in Yavapai County within the state of Arizona

- Location in Arizona, United States Seligman, Arizona (the United States)
- Coordinates: 35°19′37″N 112°52′20″W
- Country: United States
- State: Arizona
- County: Yavapai

Area
  - Total: 6.42 sq mi (16.62 km^{2})
  - Land: 6.42 sq mi (16.62 km^{2})
  - Water: 0 sq mi (0.00 km^{2})
- Elevation: 5,256 ft (1,602 m)

Population (2020)
  - Total: 446
  - Density: 69.5/sq mi (26.84/km^{2})
- Time zone: UTC−7 (MST)
- ZIP code: 86337
- Area code: 928
- FIPS code: 04-65420
- GNIS feature ID: 2409305

Seligman (Havasupai: Thavgyalyal) is a census-designated place (CDP) on the northern border of Yavapai County, Arizona, United States. The population was 446 at the 2020 census. It is one of the stops on historic U.S. Route 66.

== Geography ==
Seligman is located at 35°19′42″N 112°52′27″W (35.328199, −112.874303), at 5,240 feet (1,600 m) in elevation, alongside the Big Chino Wash, in a northern section of Chino Valley. The wash is a major tributary of the Verde River. Seligman is a popular stopping point along Historic U.S. Route 66.

According to the United States Census Bureau, the Seligman CDP has a total area of 6.4 square miles (17 km^{2}), all land.

== History ==
The region was in the longtime homeland of the Havasupai people, who had a settlement in the present-day Seligman area. The town site was on Beale's Wagon Road, and a stage stop on the Mojave Road.

Originally, Seligman was called "Prescott Junction" because it was the railroad stop on the Santa Fe mainline junction with the Prescott and Arizona Central Railway Company feeder line running to Prescott, in the Arizona Territory. The Atchison, Topeka and Santa Fe Railway (AT&SF) had reached it in 1882. In 1886 it was renamed Seligman, after Jesse Seligman, one of the founders of J. & W. Seligman & Co. of New York, who helped finance the railroad lines in the area. The original feeder line to Prescott was replaced in 1891 by the Santa Fe, Prescott and Phoenix Railway with the Santa Fe mainline junction at Ash Fork instead.

Because of its flat land Seligman became a large switching yard consisting of many tracks, and served as a large livestock shipping center for the areas ranchers. It was also a terminal point for changing train crews between Winslow and Needles, who used overnight cottages in the town.

=== Havasu Harvey House ===
The "Havasu House" was a Fred Harvey Company Harvey House hotel and restaurant in Seligman, serving the Santa Fe Railway and local residents. It was named "Havasu" after the native Havasupai tribe of the area. Adjacent to it was the Santa Fe Depot and Reading Room. The Havasu Harvey House opened in 1905, closed in 1954, and was demolished in 2008.

Passenger trains ceased stopping in Seligman in 1984. The Burlington Northern Santa Fe Railway (BNSF) has owned the tracks through town since 1996, which carries numerous freight trains and nonstop Amtrak trains. The former Santa Fe Reading room moved to the Seligman High School.

=== Seligman Commercial Historic District ===
- Seligman Commercial Historic District
- U.S. National Register of Historic Places
- U.S. Historic district
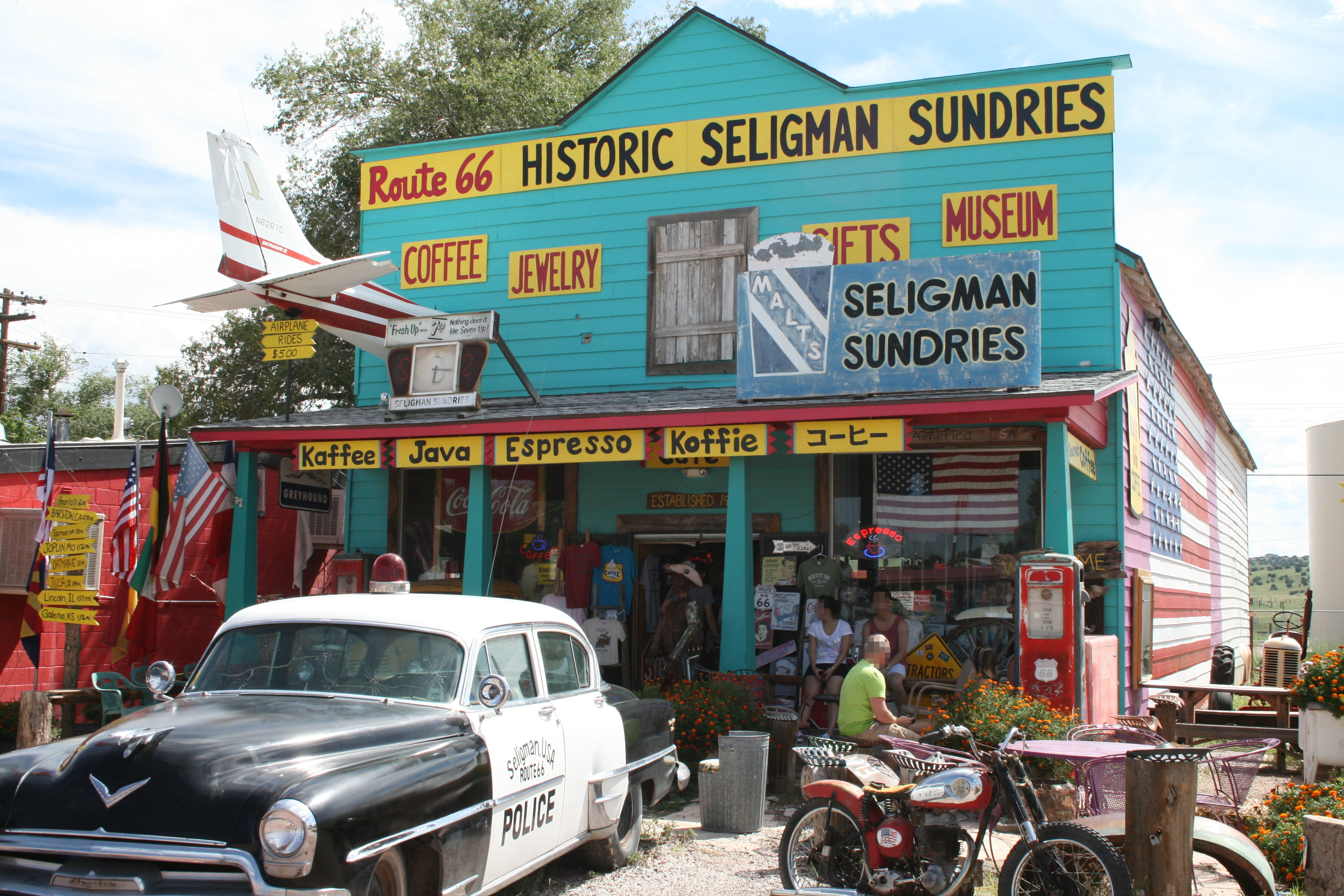
- The historic Seligman Sundries building located in the district
- Location: Roughly bounded by First and Lamport streets and Picacho and Railroad avenues, Seligman, Arizona
- Coordinates: 35°19′35″N 112°52′27″W
- Area: 18 acres (7.3 ha)
- Built: ca. 1903
- Architectural style: Early Commercial, Prairie School, etc.
- NRHP reference No.: 04000511
- Added to NRHP: February 1, 2005

The Seligman Commercial Historic District is a historic district in central Seligman. The historic district is along historic Route 66 in town, which was designated a historic highway by the state of Arizona in 1978. The Seligman Commercial Historic District was placed on the National Register of Historic Places in 2005.

Seligman was on the original U.S. Route 66 from 1926 through 1978, when Interstate 40 bypassed it a few miles south. Seligman experienced its real heyday after World War II, when returning veterans and other motorists hit the road and made the Southwest a popular tourist destination. The Seligman Commercial Historic District is roughly bounded by 1st and Lamport Sts. and Picacho and Railroad Aves. It was added to National Register of Historic Places on February 1, 2005, reference #04000511. The Seligman Commercial Historic District protects the historical central area's early 20th century commercial buildings along Historic Route 66, a revived popular tourist destination. Historic district contributing properties include the Pitts General Merchandise Store and the U.S. Post Office from 1903, the Pioneer Hall and Theatre and the Seligman Garage from 1905, and the Seligman Pool Hall from 1923.

In 1987 Seligman gained its name "Birthplace of Historic Route 66" due to the efforts of Seligman residents, who convinced the State of Arizona to dedicate Route 66 a historic highway. Seligman is the first stop heading west on the longest uninterrupted stretch of historic Route 66, running around 160 miles (260 km) to Topock on the east side of the Colorado River. (This claim is about the historical Route 66 and is not to be construed as "the Birthplace of Route 66". Route 66 was established by the U.S. Congress on November 26, 1926, starting in Chicago, Illinois, and ending in Los Angeles, California. The first sign recognizing this designation was posted in Springfield, Missouri, on April 30, 1926, and it took over a decade to pave the full route in its entirety.)

Pictured are some of the contributing structures in the Seligman Commercial Historic District and the historic Route 66. Also, pictured are some of the historical structures outside of the Seligman Commercial Historic District zone, some of which are individually listed in the National Register of Historic places.

- The Snow Cap Drive-In – built in 1953 by Juan Delgadillo and family with scrap lumber that Juan collected while working for the Santa Fe Railway.
- The Shell Gas Station, Olson's Shell, The Road Trip Museum/Return to the 50s, Return to the 50s Gift Shop – built in 1961, this building, renamed various times, was one of the locations of the bus stop, when Greyhound buses still stopped in Seligman.
- Miller's Dry Cleaners, Rainbow Café, Seligman Supply, The Rusty Bolt– built in 1933, this building has been used as a dry-cleaners, a 24-hour restaurant, a hardware store, and a curio shop.
- The Thunderbird Indian Store, Rusty Bolt Antiques, Private Residence, Rusty Bolt Gift Shop – built in 1955 by Reginald Sander. This building was merged with old Miller's Dry Cleaning building to make the large building that houses the Rusty Bolt.
- The Copper Cart – built in 1952, became a store and is no longer the classic diner it once was.
- Pioneer Hall Theatre/Dancehall Ted's Fountain "Famous for Malts" and Historic Seligman Sundries – built in 1905, this building was originally a theater and dance hall. In 1930, it was then converted to a drug store and fountain soda shop. It became a coffee house and curio shop.
- The Black Cat Bar – rebuilt in 1963, it was once called "Jolly's Black Cat Café"
- The Pitts & Washington Central Commercial building – built in 1903 by Jim Pitts. In recent years the building has been used as a variety store and an antique stove store.
- Canyon Shadows Motel, Comfort Lodge, Canyon Lodge – built in 1963 and as noted had undergone various name changes
- Donovan's Garage / Texaco Station (Donovan's 1-Stop Shop) 1936 Wilkinson Motors / Texaco / Ford Dealership B&R Car Care / Texaco Goldsmith Motors (Ford Agency) B&B Automotive Seff Feed Store.
- The Aztec Motel – the original building was built in 1935 and the additions in 1955.
- The Atchison, Topeka & Santa Fe Railway Company reading room – built in 1899, the building is located within the modern school grounds of Seligman.
- The Cottage Hotel – built in 1910, was listed in the National Register of Historic Places on February 12, 1998, and is located at 1st Street and Shoney Avenue.
- The Sheriff Commodore Perry Owens house and bar – Owens resided in Seligman and opened a bar after he retired from law enforcement. He was a lawman and gunfighter of the Old West. One of his many exploits was the Owens-Blevins Shootout in Arizona Territory during the Pleasant Valley War.
Structures in Seligman

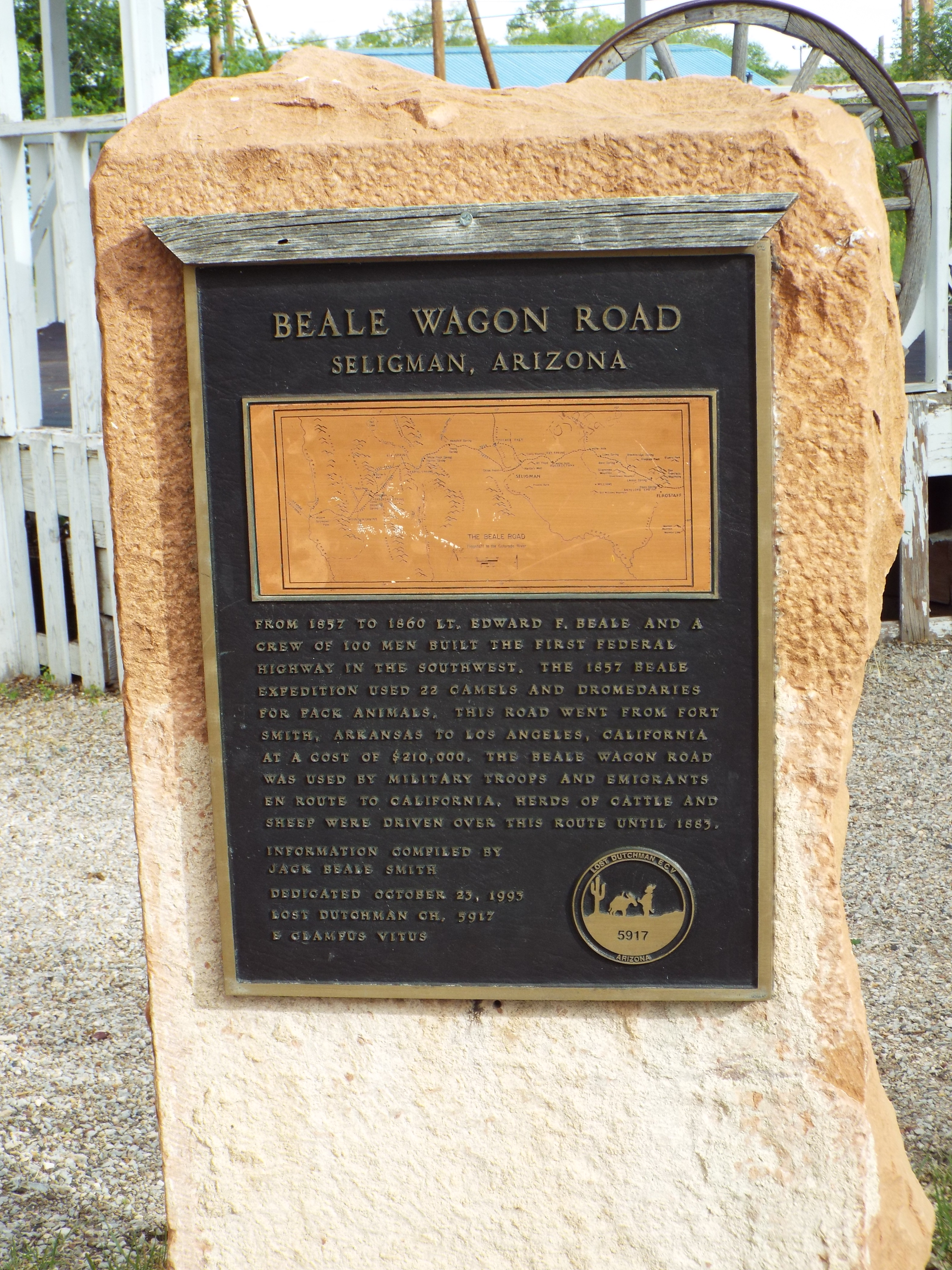
Beale Wagon Road Trail Marker

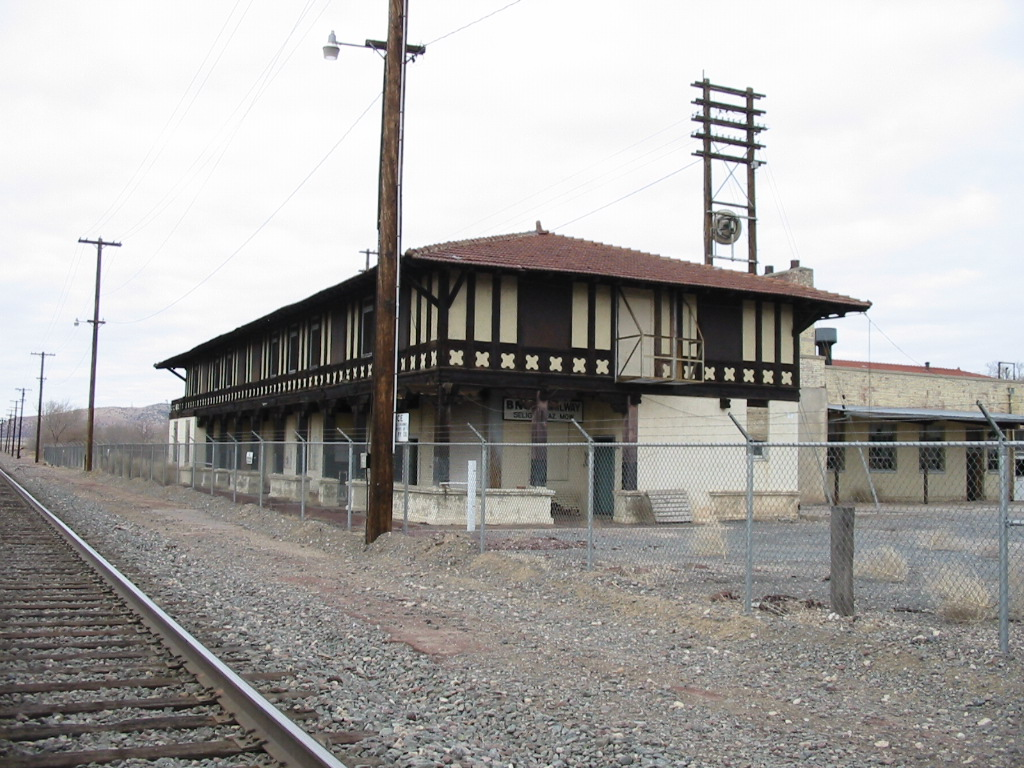
Havasu Harvey House, the former Seligman Harvey House (1905−2008)

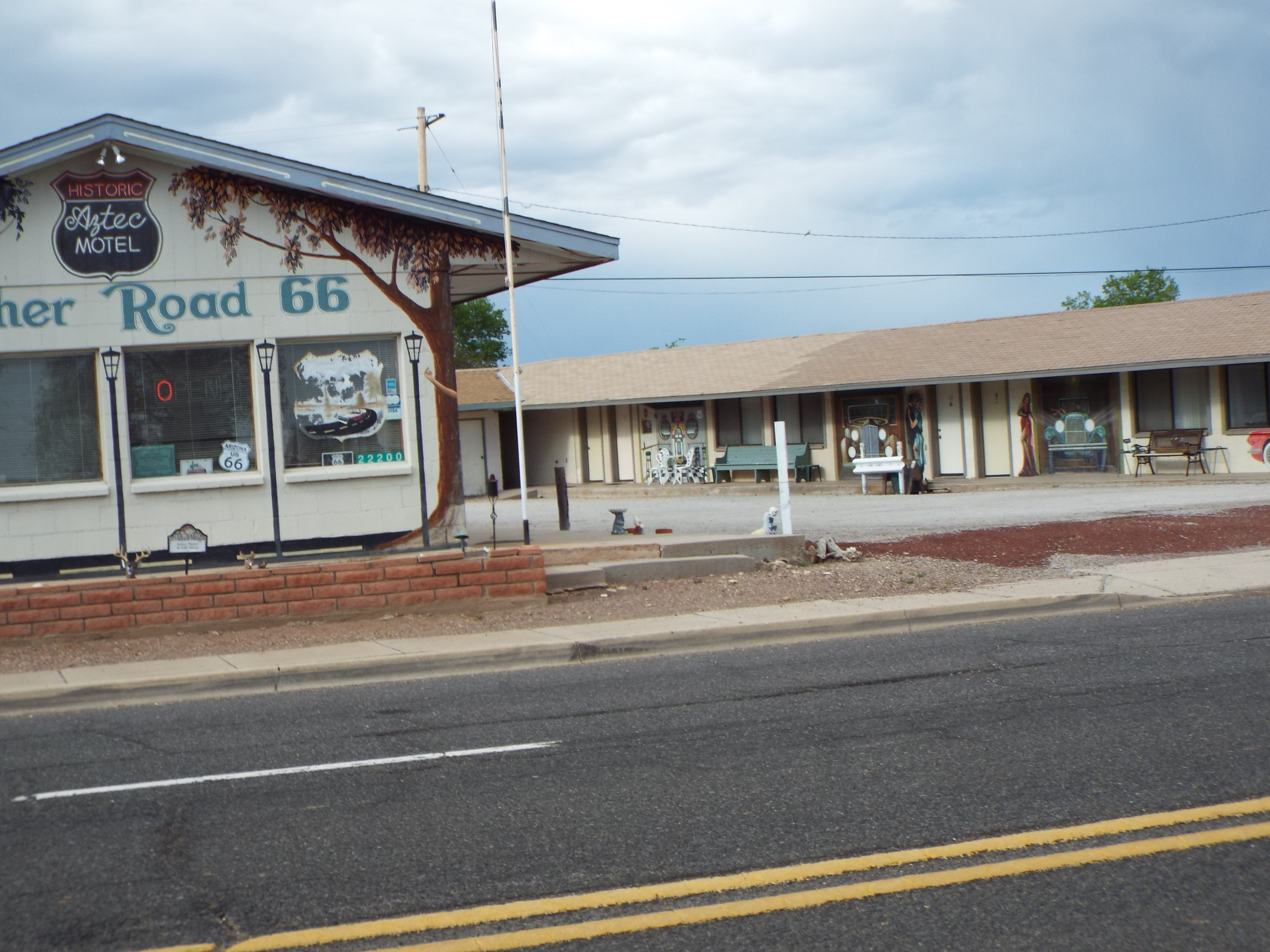
Aztec Motel – 1955

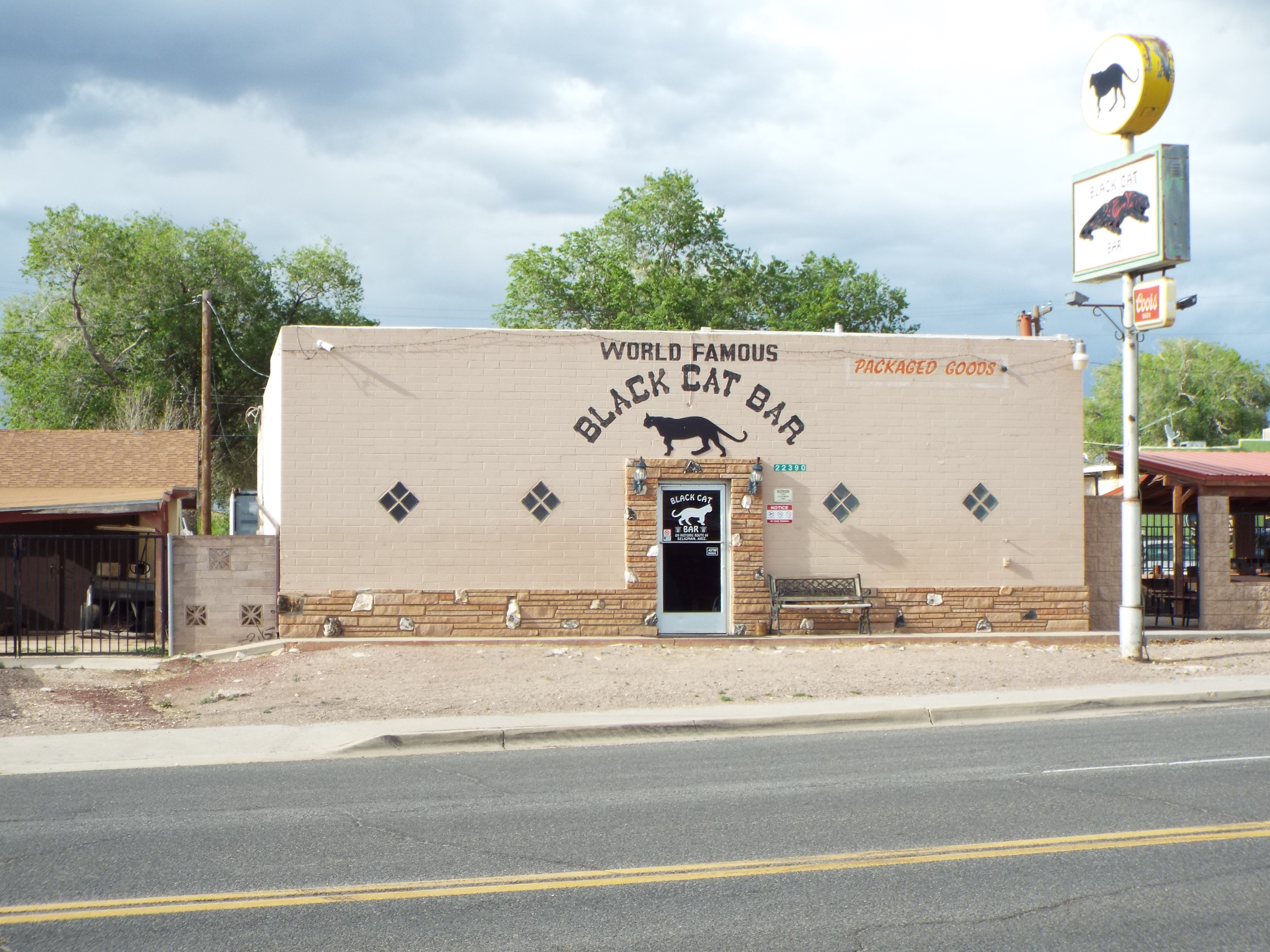
Black Cat Bar – 1935

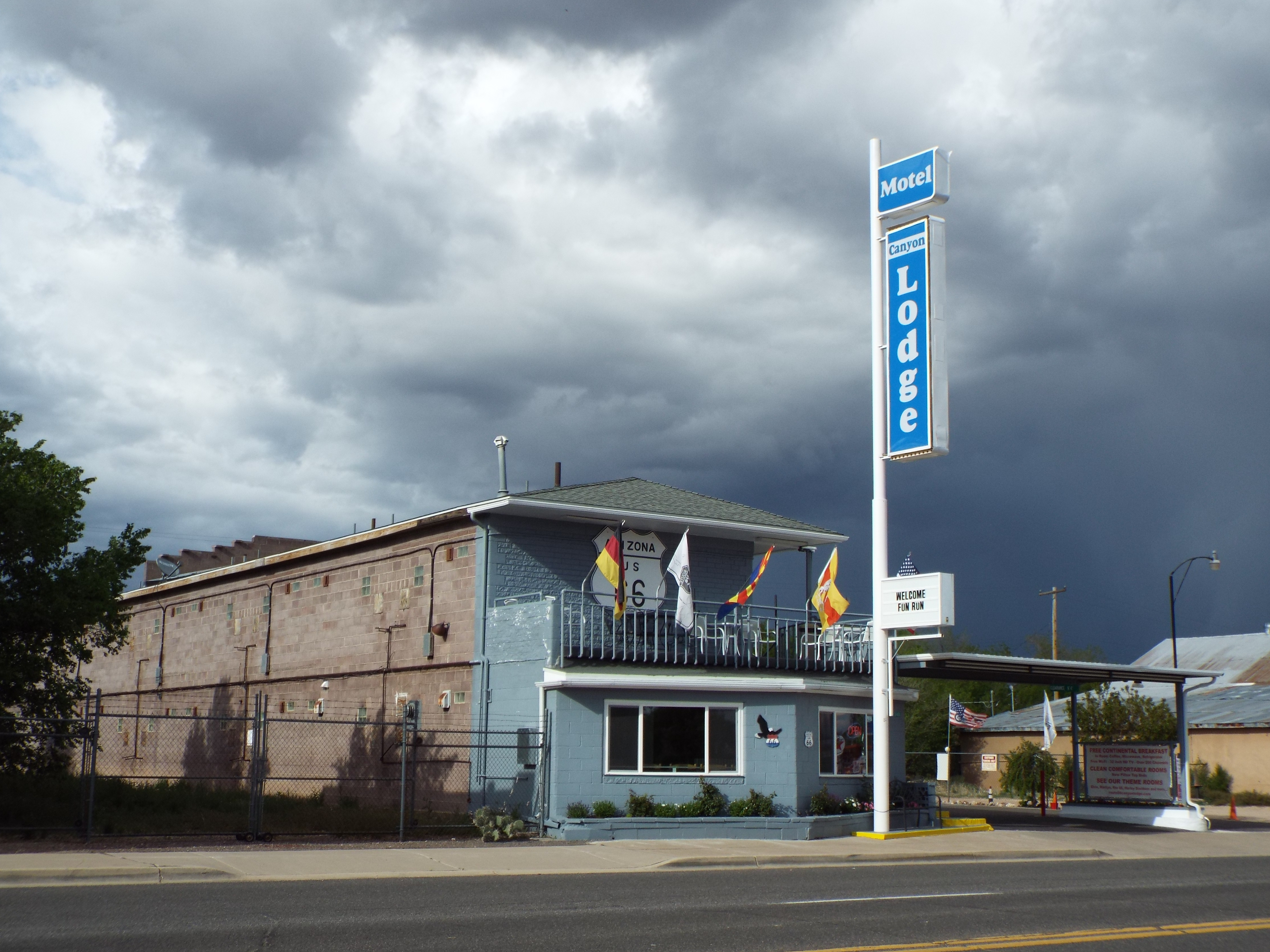
Canyon Lodge – 1963

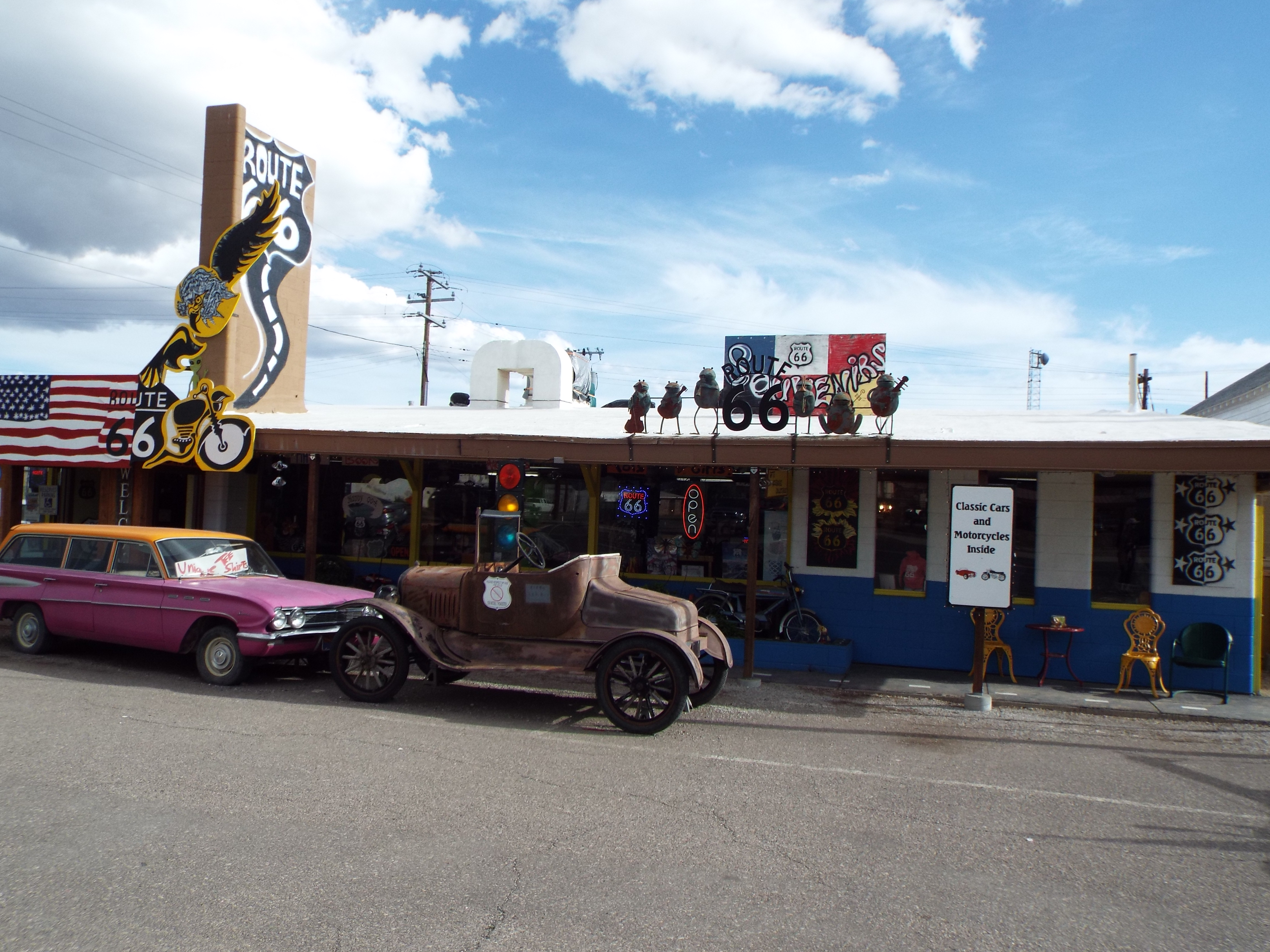
Copper Cart – 1952

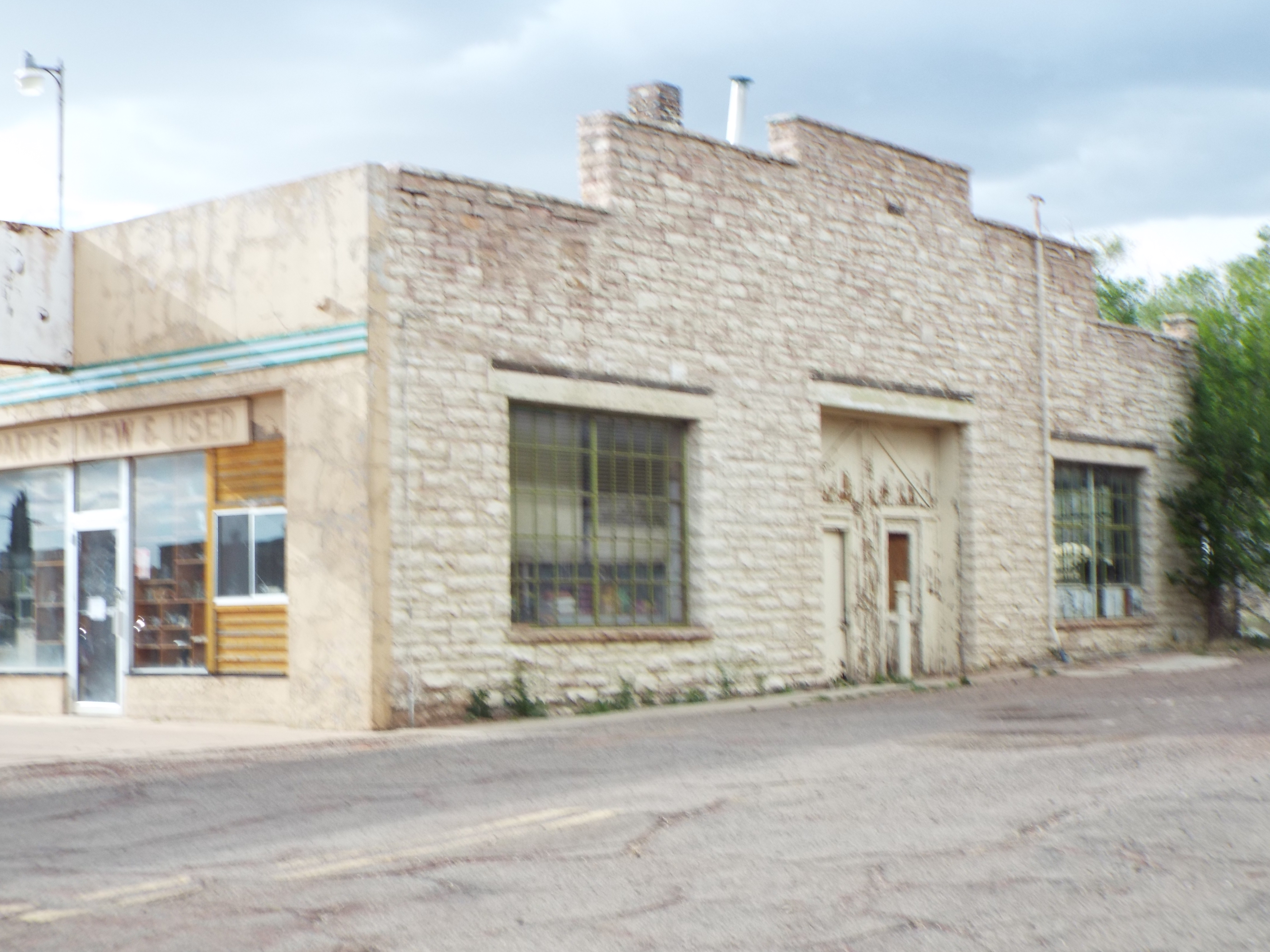
Donovan's 1-Stop Garage (B&B Auto) – 1936

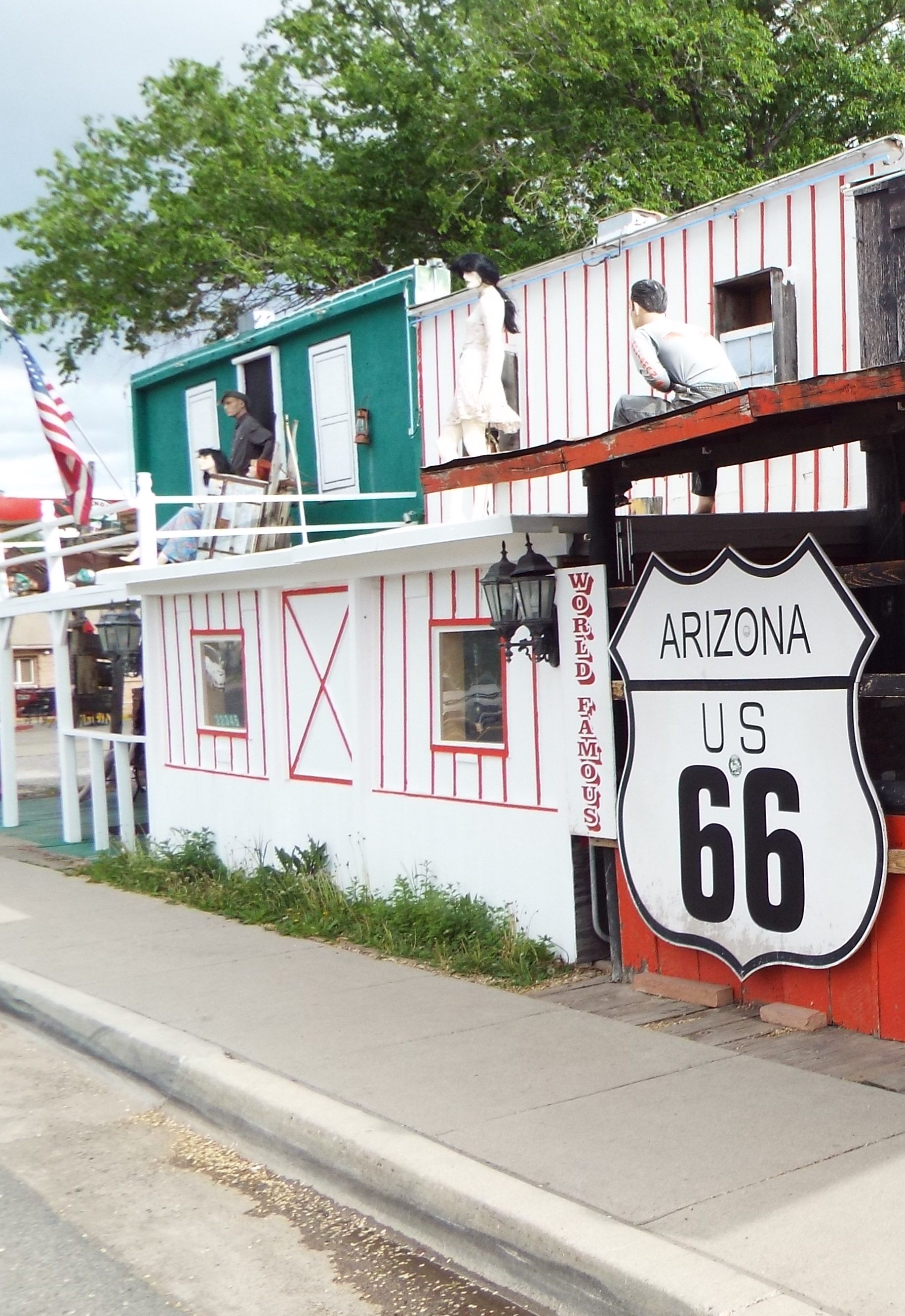
Miller's Dry Cleaners – 1933

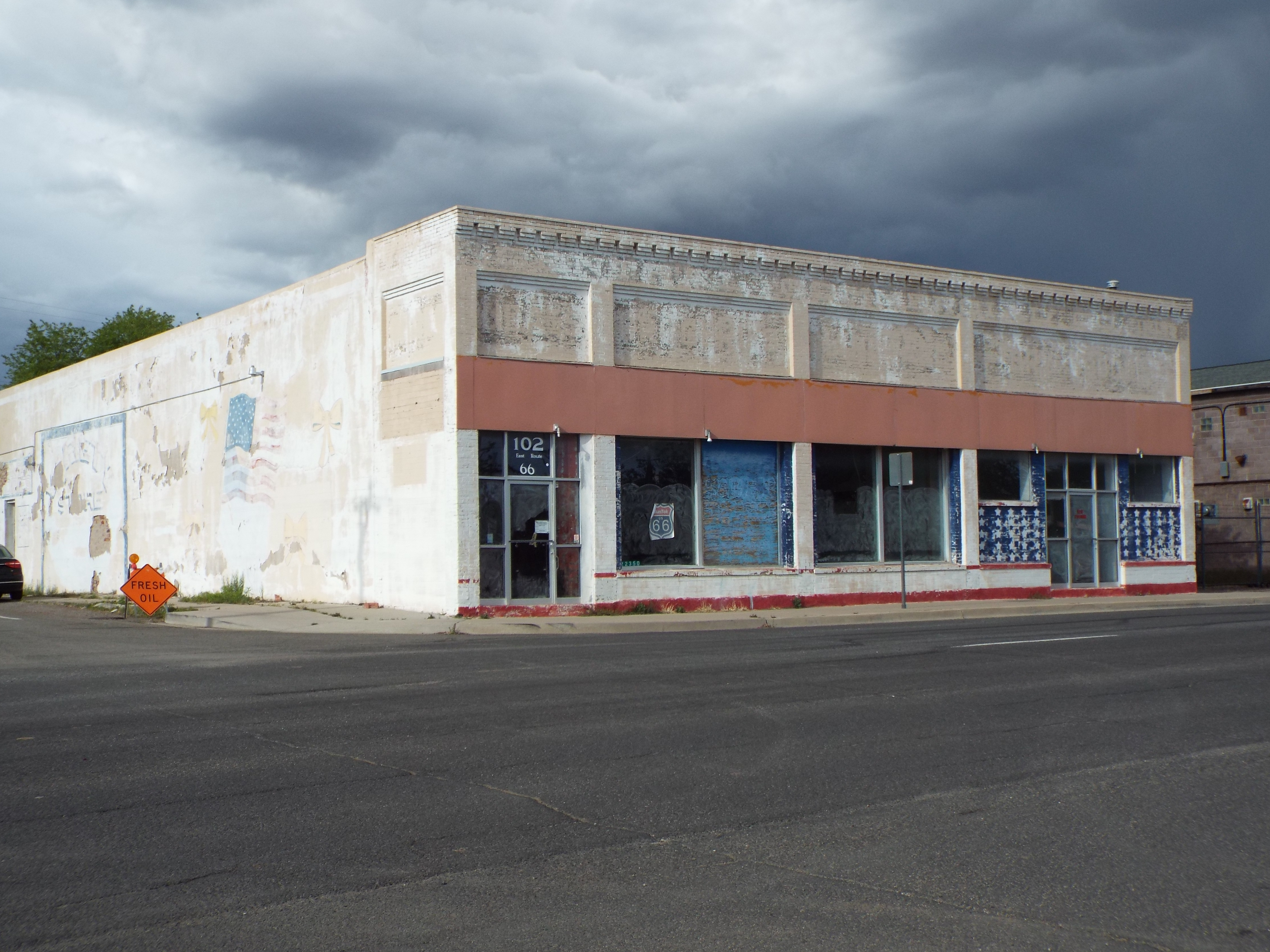
Pitts General Merchandise Store and U.S. Post Office – 1903

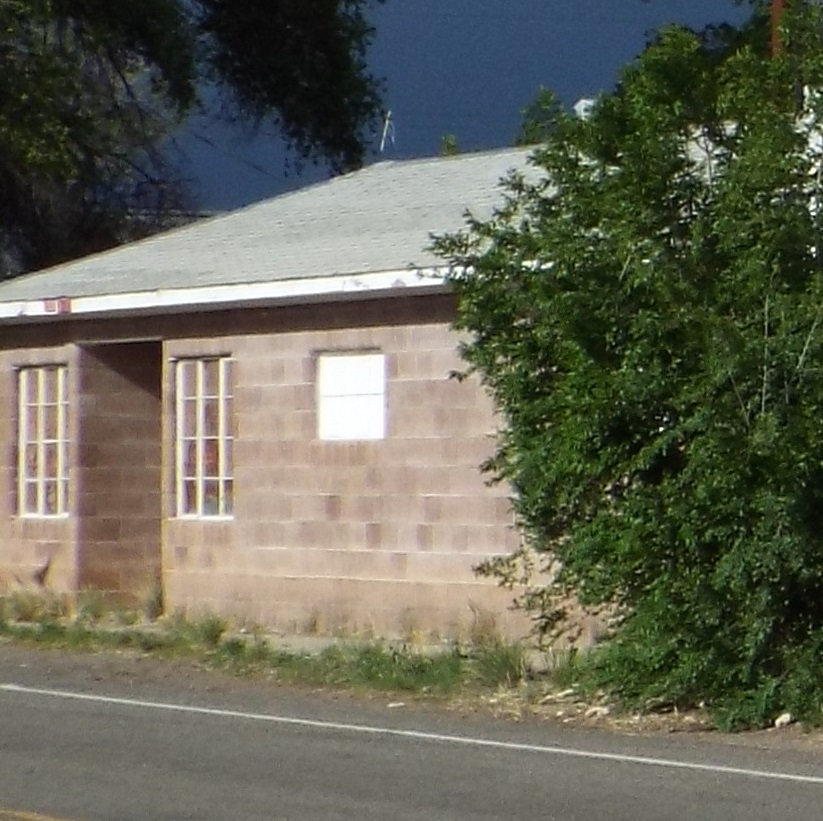
Seligman U.S. Post Office – 1903

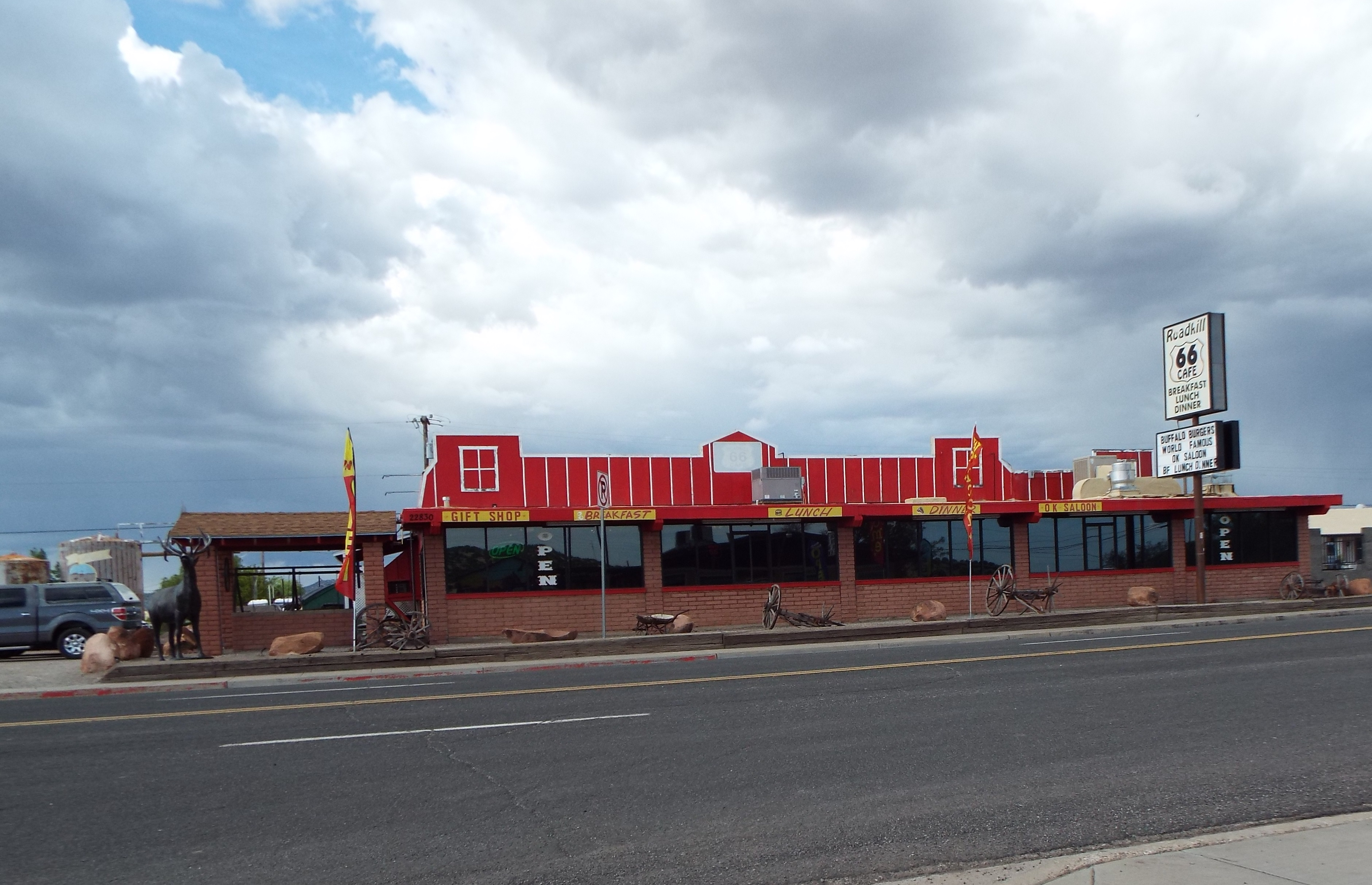
Roadkill Restaurant-OK Saloon – 1940

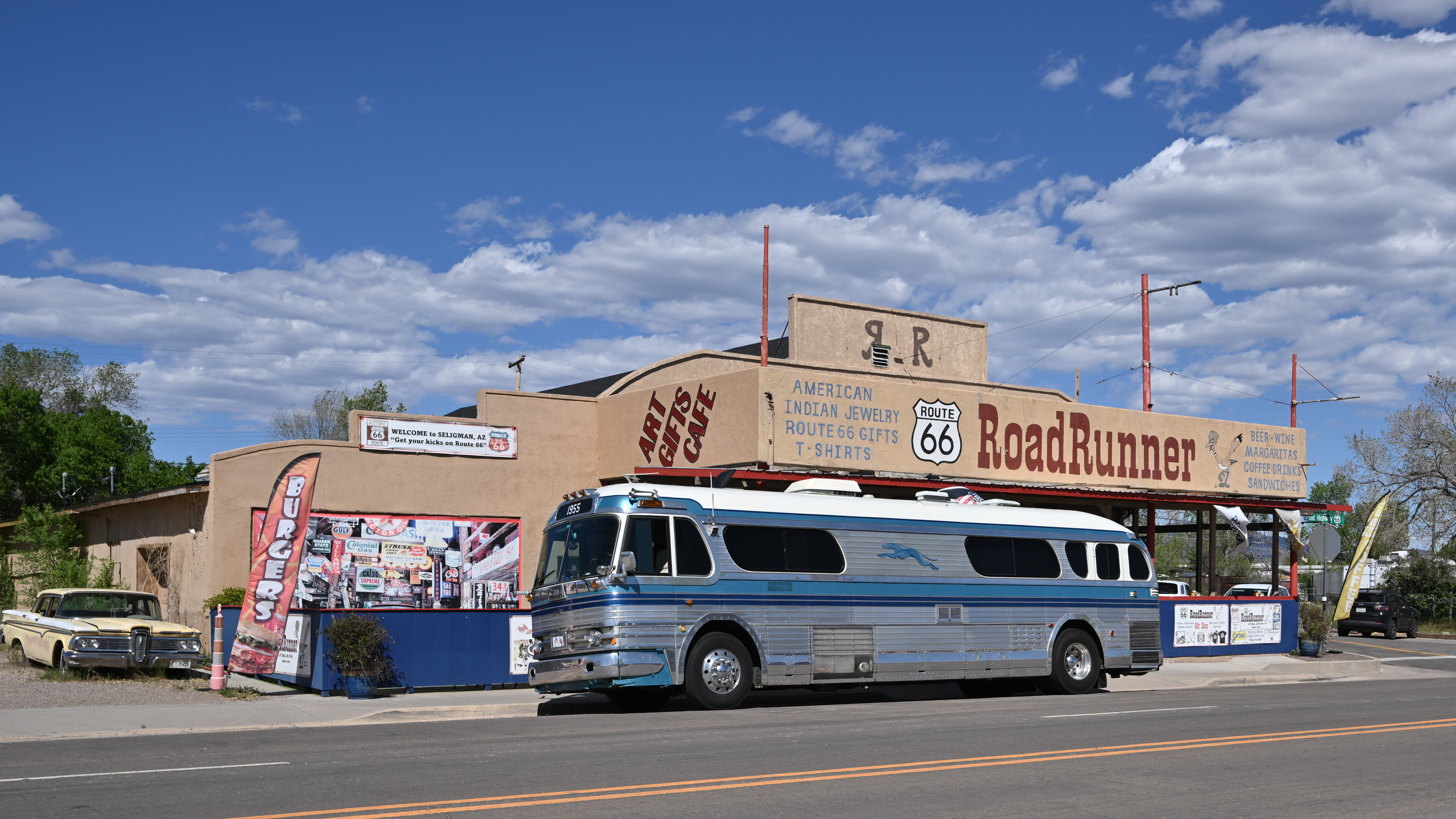
RoadRunner Cafe with 1955 Greyhound busa

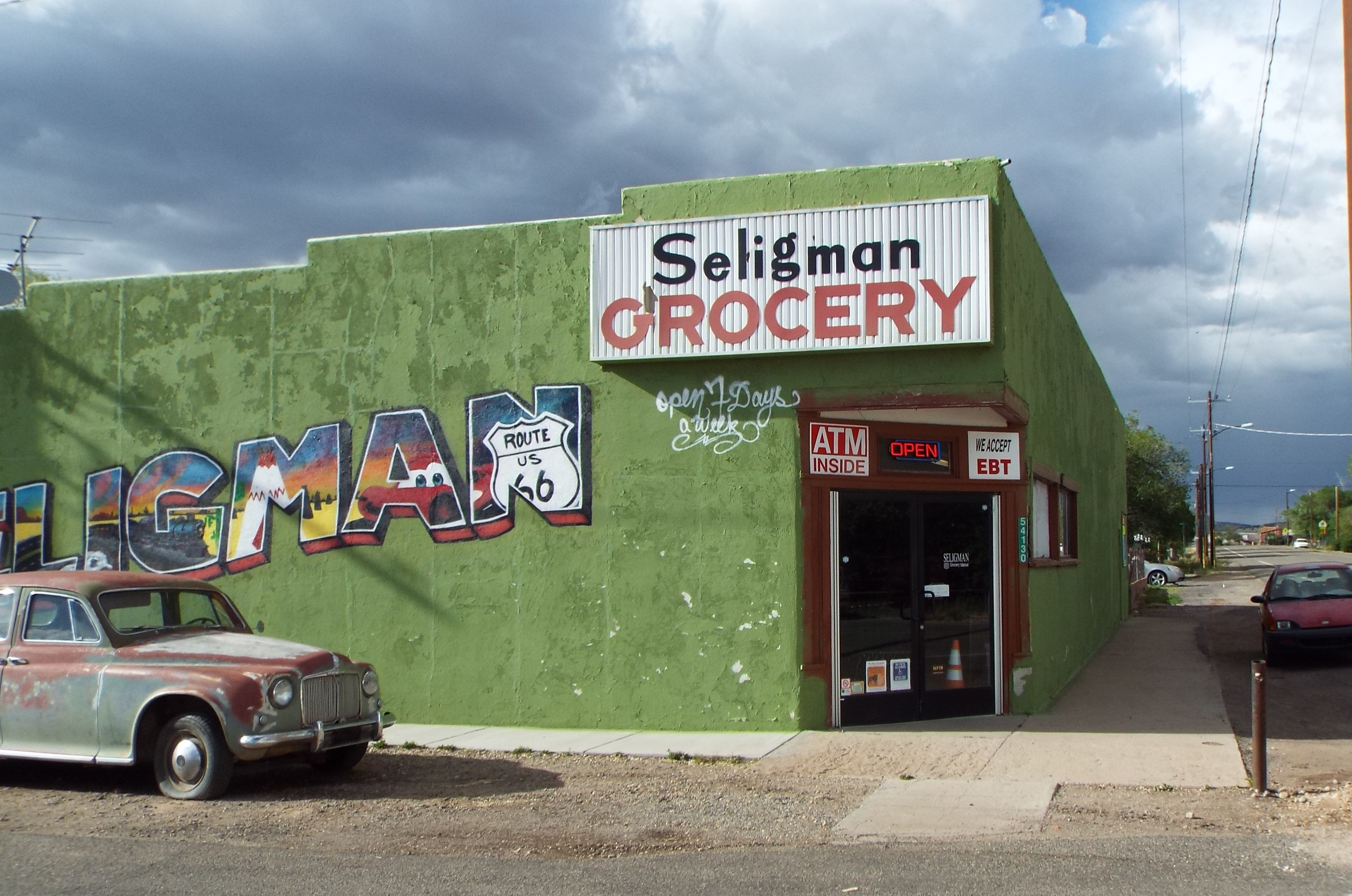
Seligman Grocery – 1903

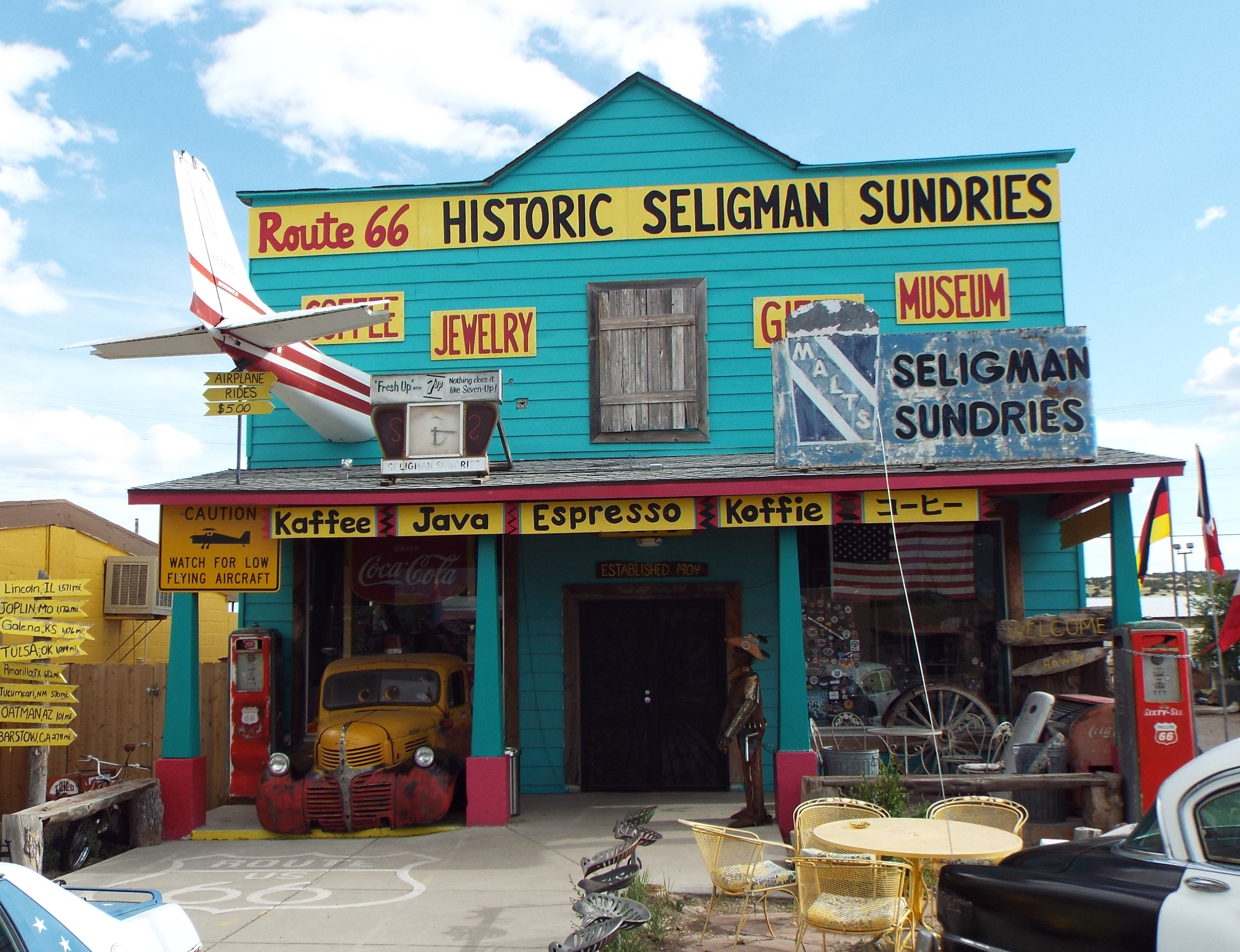
Seligman Sundries – 1905

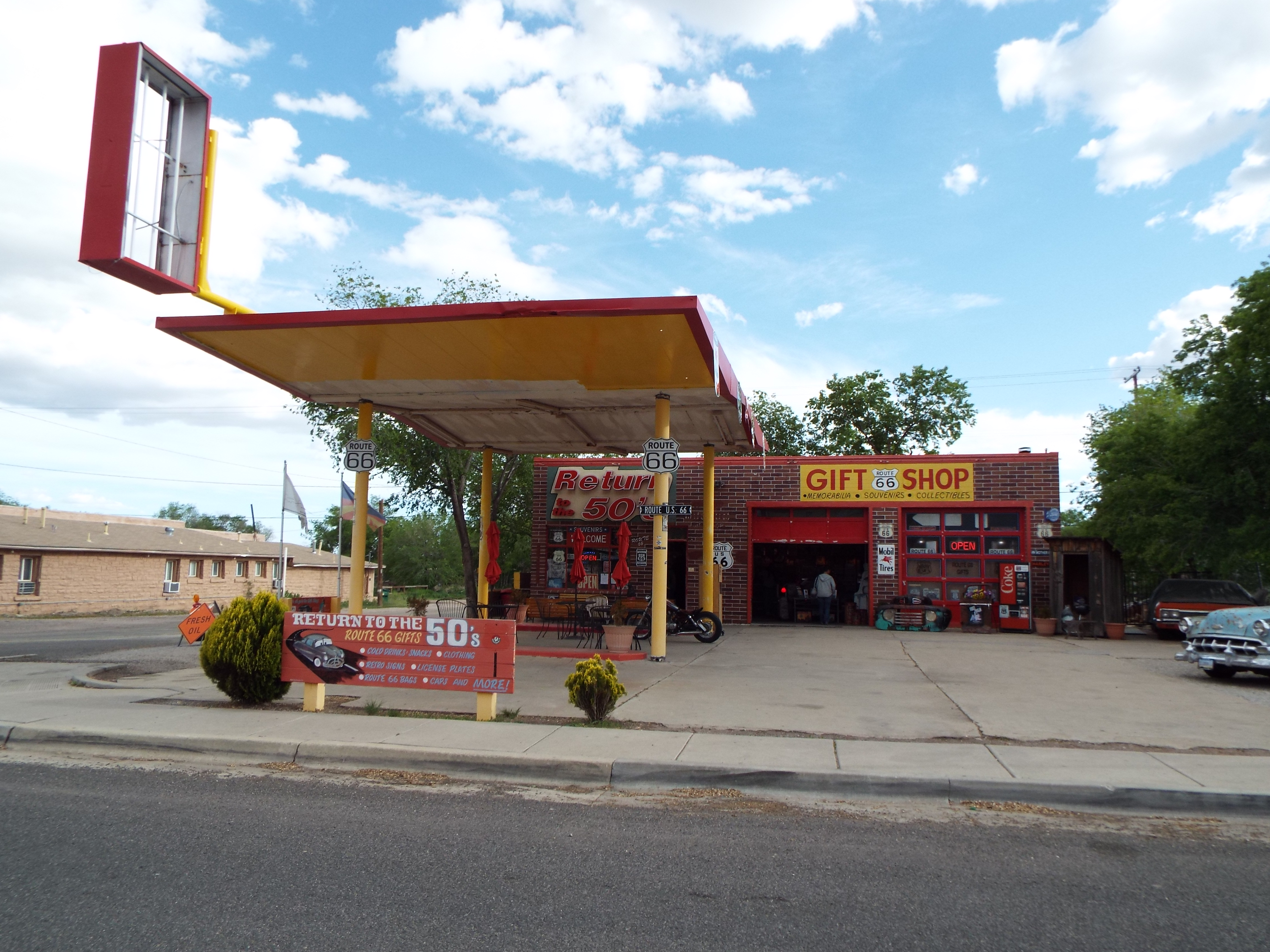
Shell Gas Station (Return to the 50s) – 1966

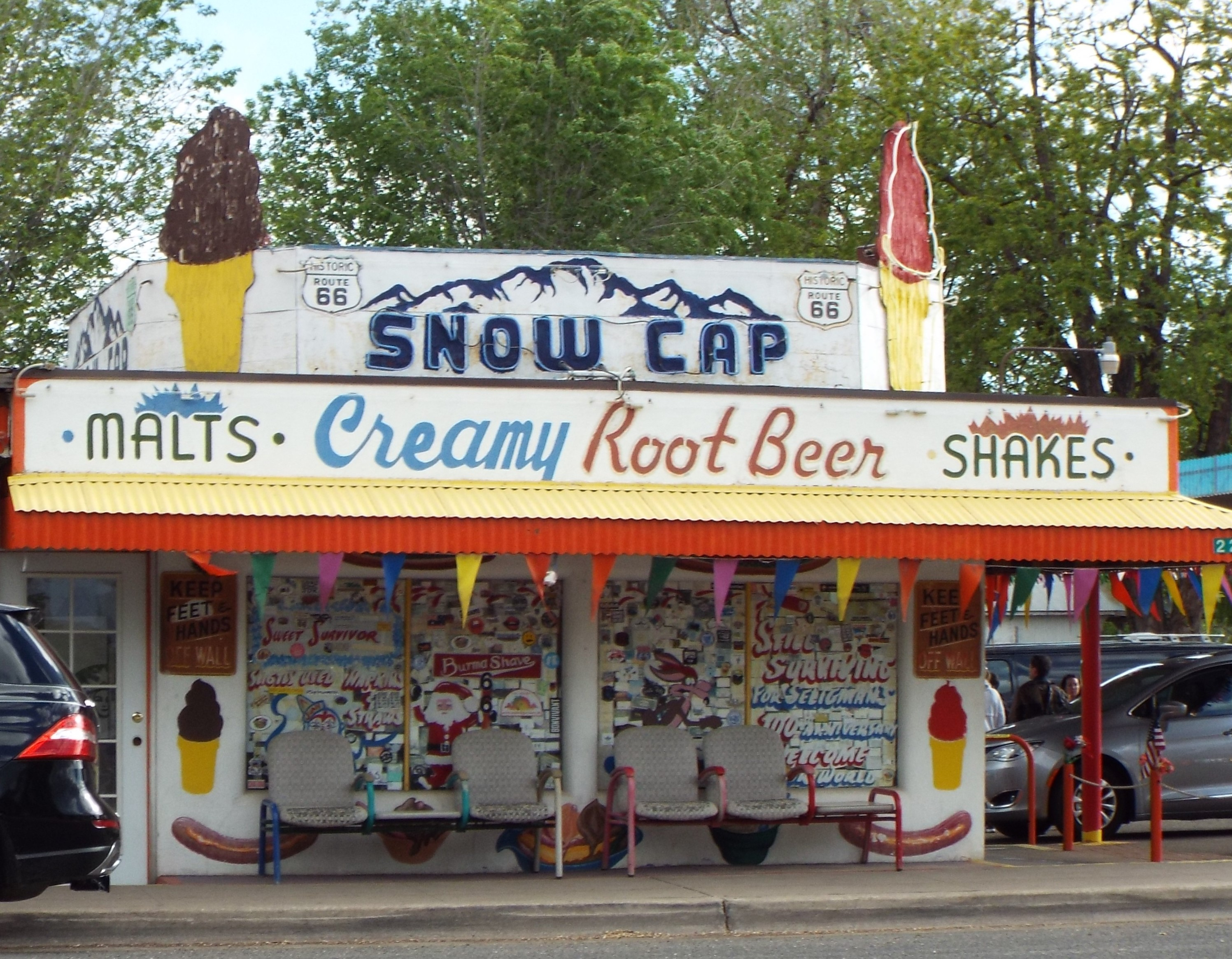
Sno Cap Drive In – 1953

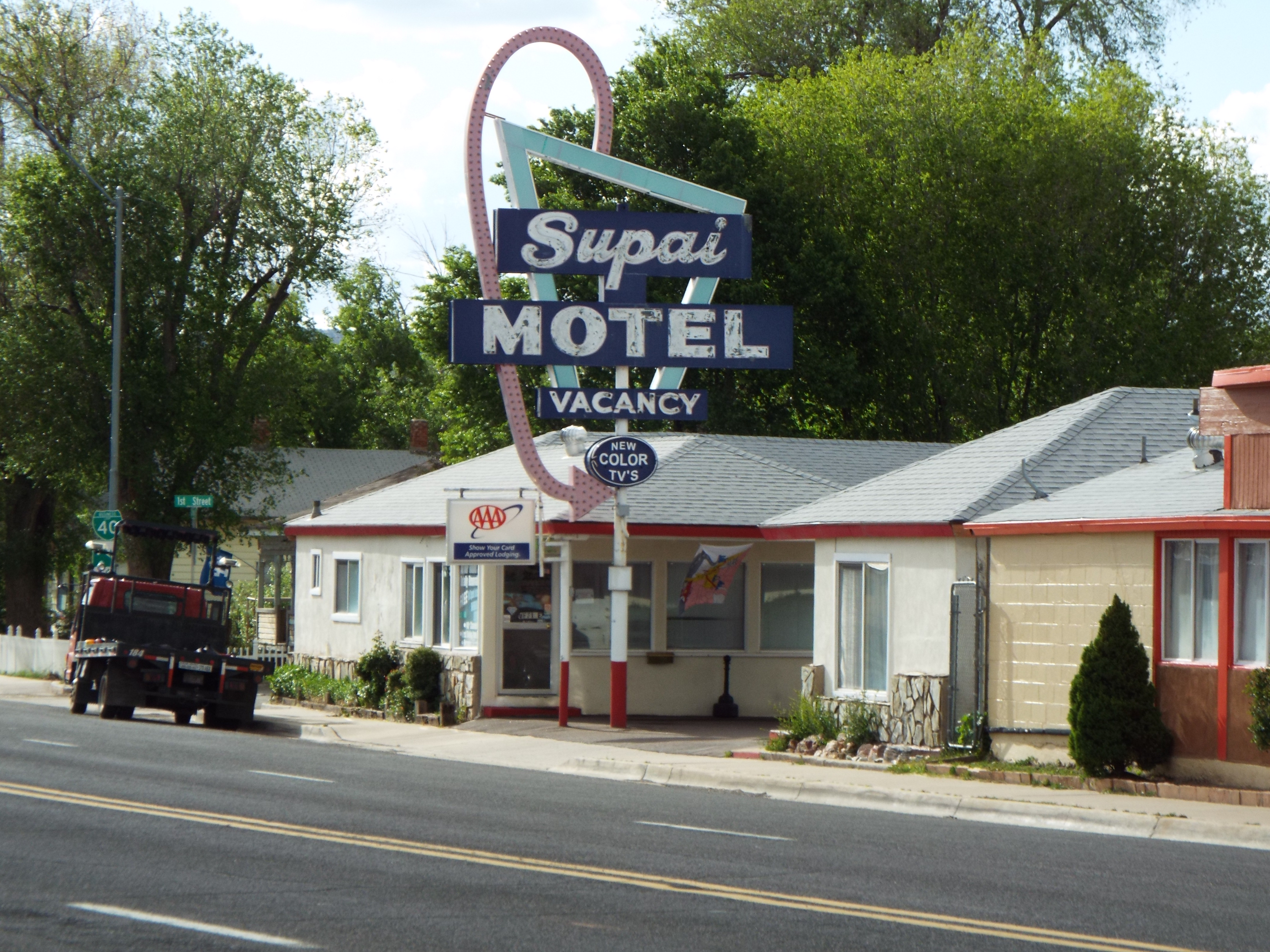
Supai Motel – 1962

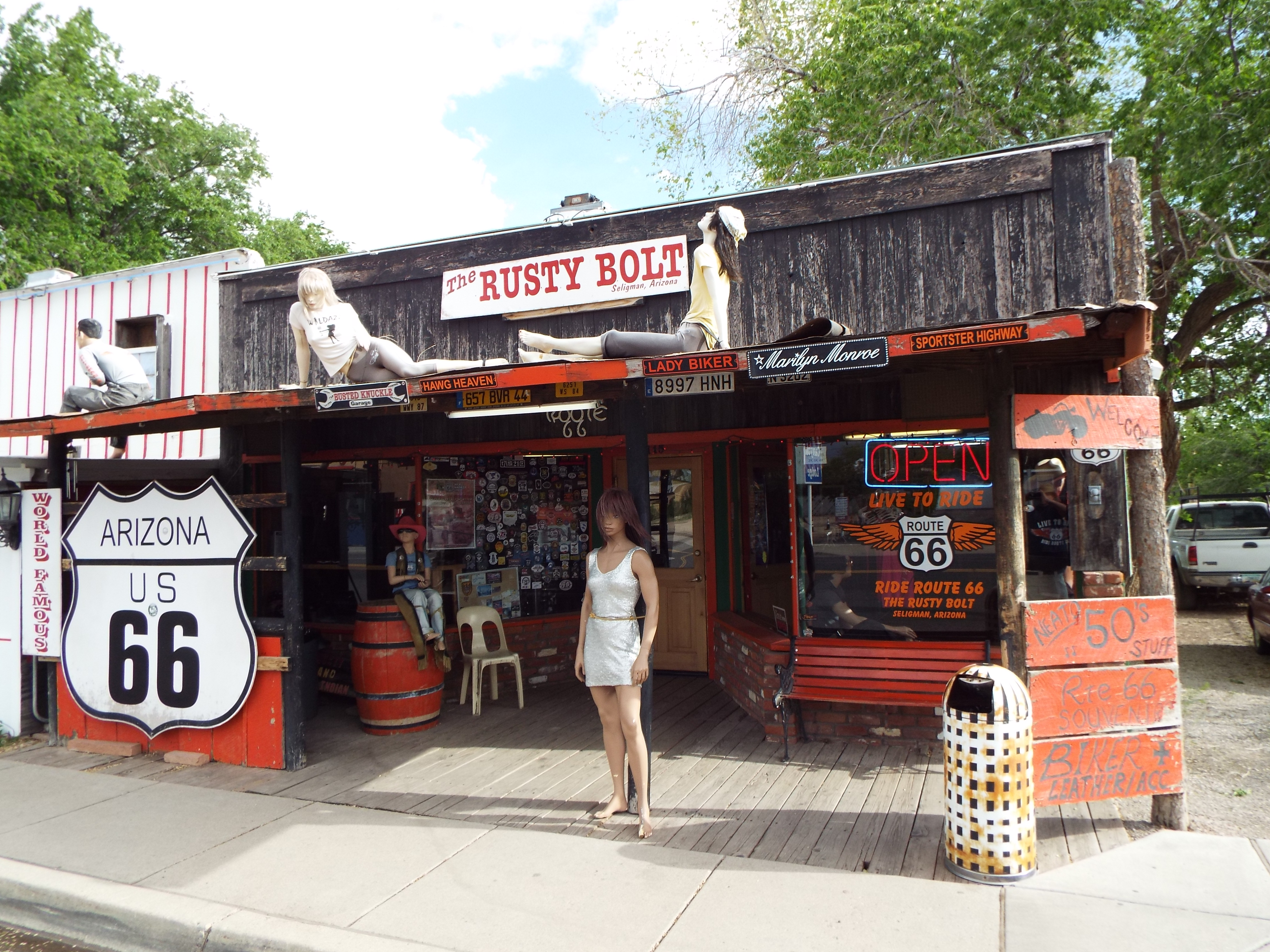
The Rusty Bolt – 1955

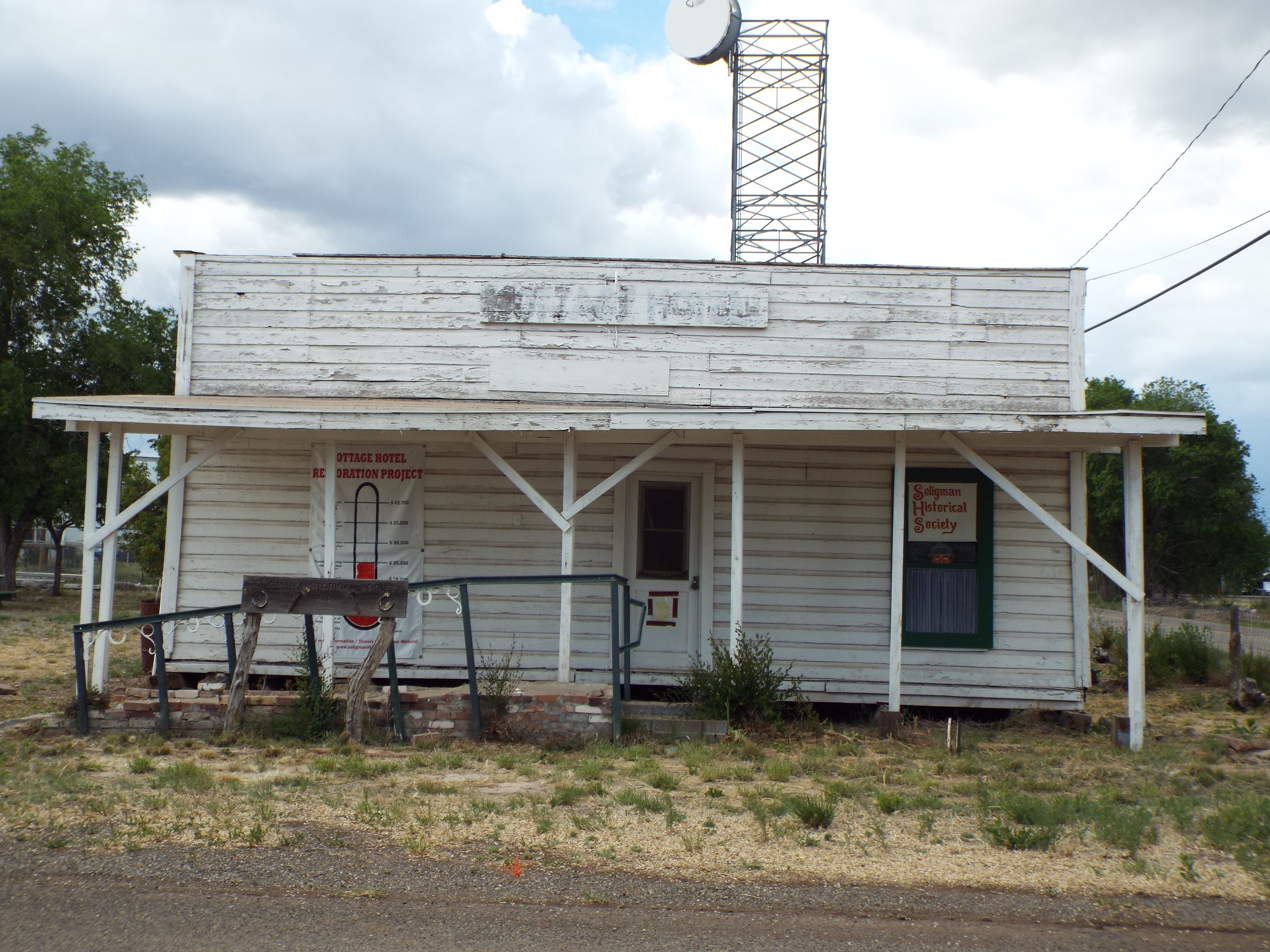
Cottage Hotel – 1912

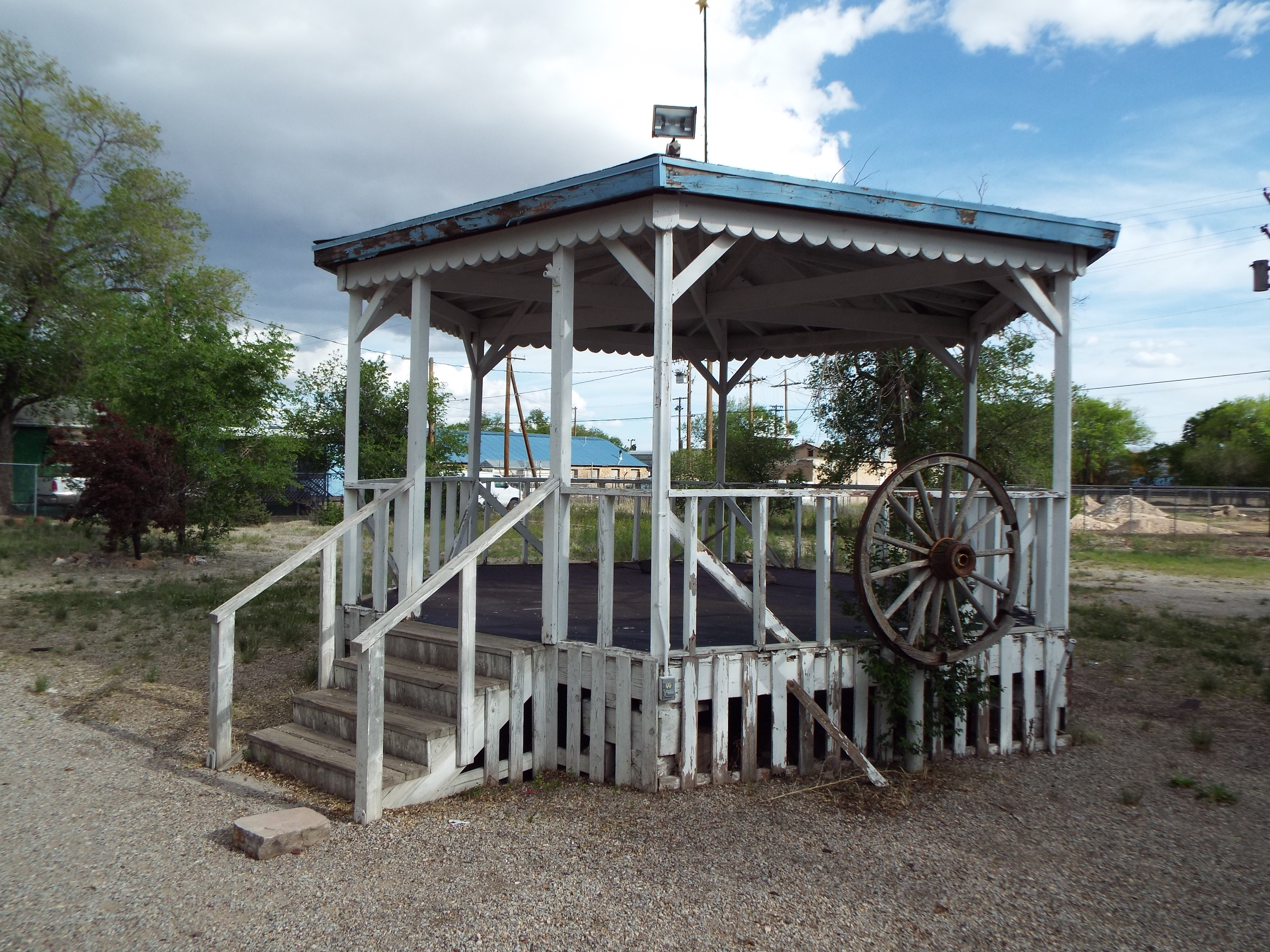
Seligman Bandshell Gazebo on Route 66 – 1900

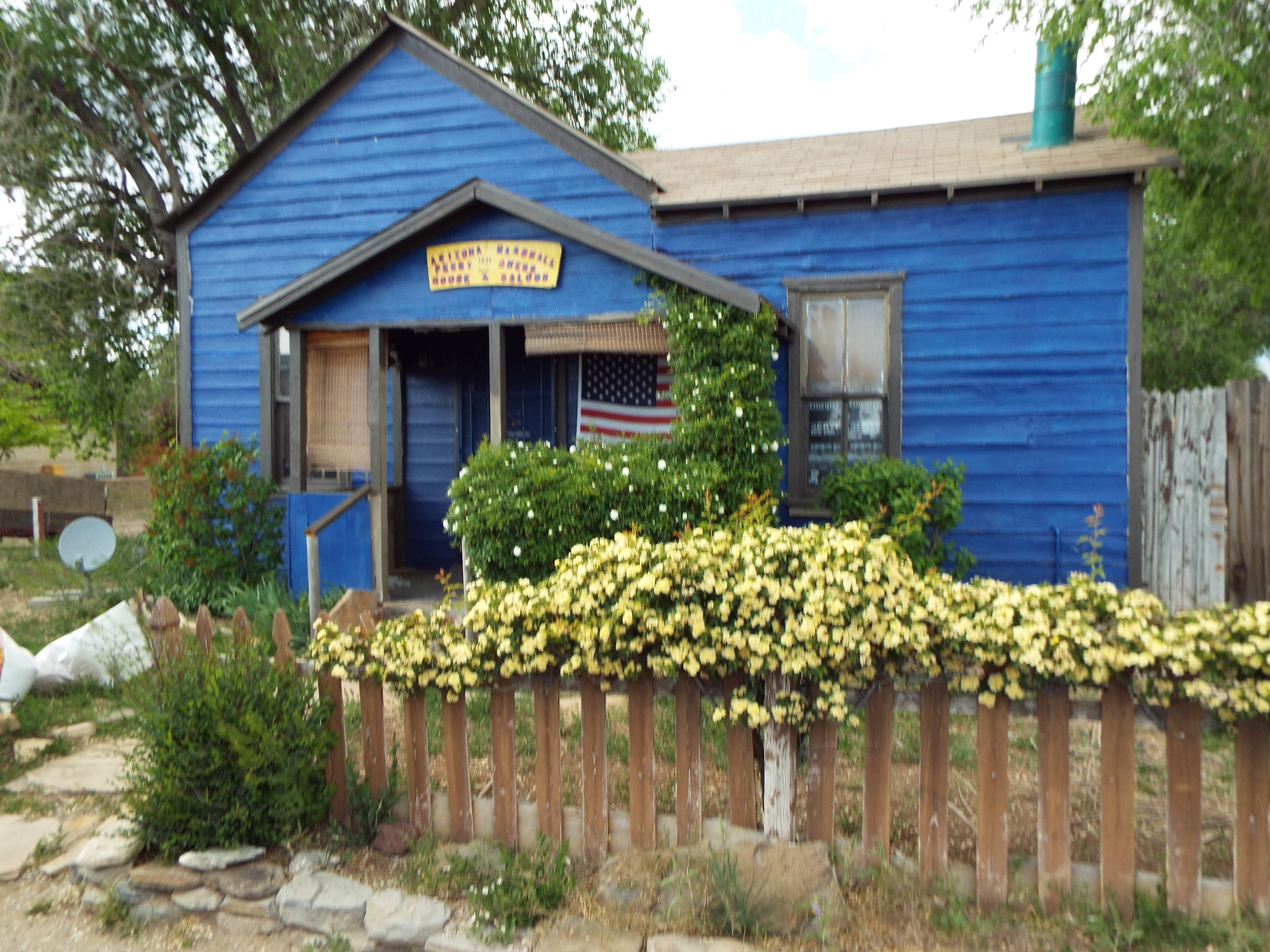
Commodore Perry Owens House – c. 1890

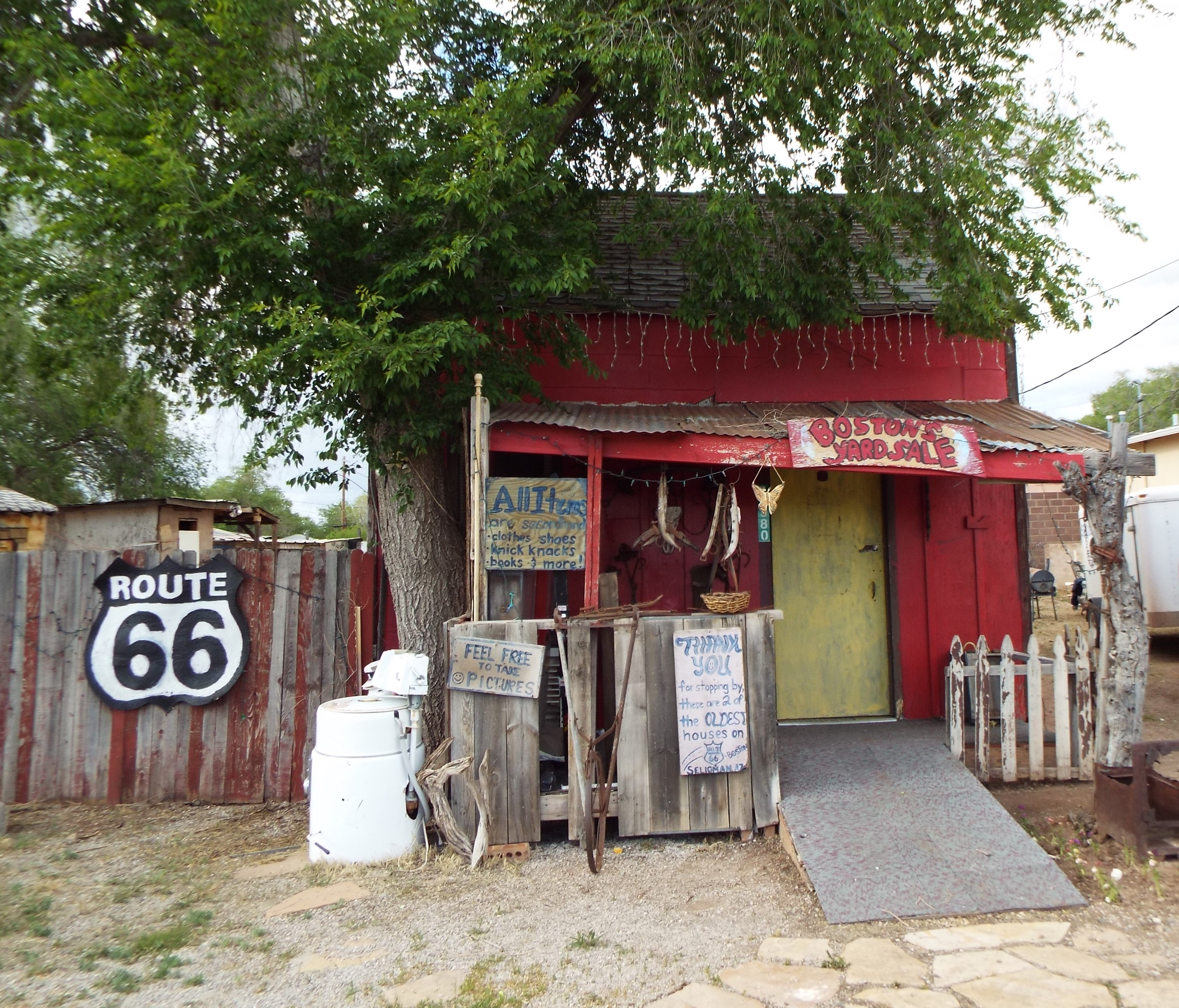
Commodore Perry Owens Saloon – c. 1890

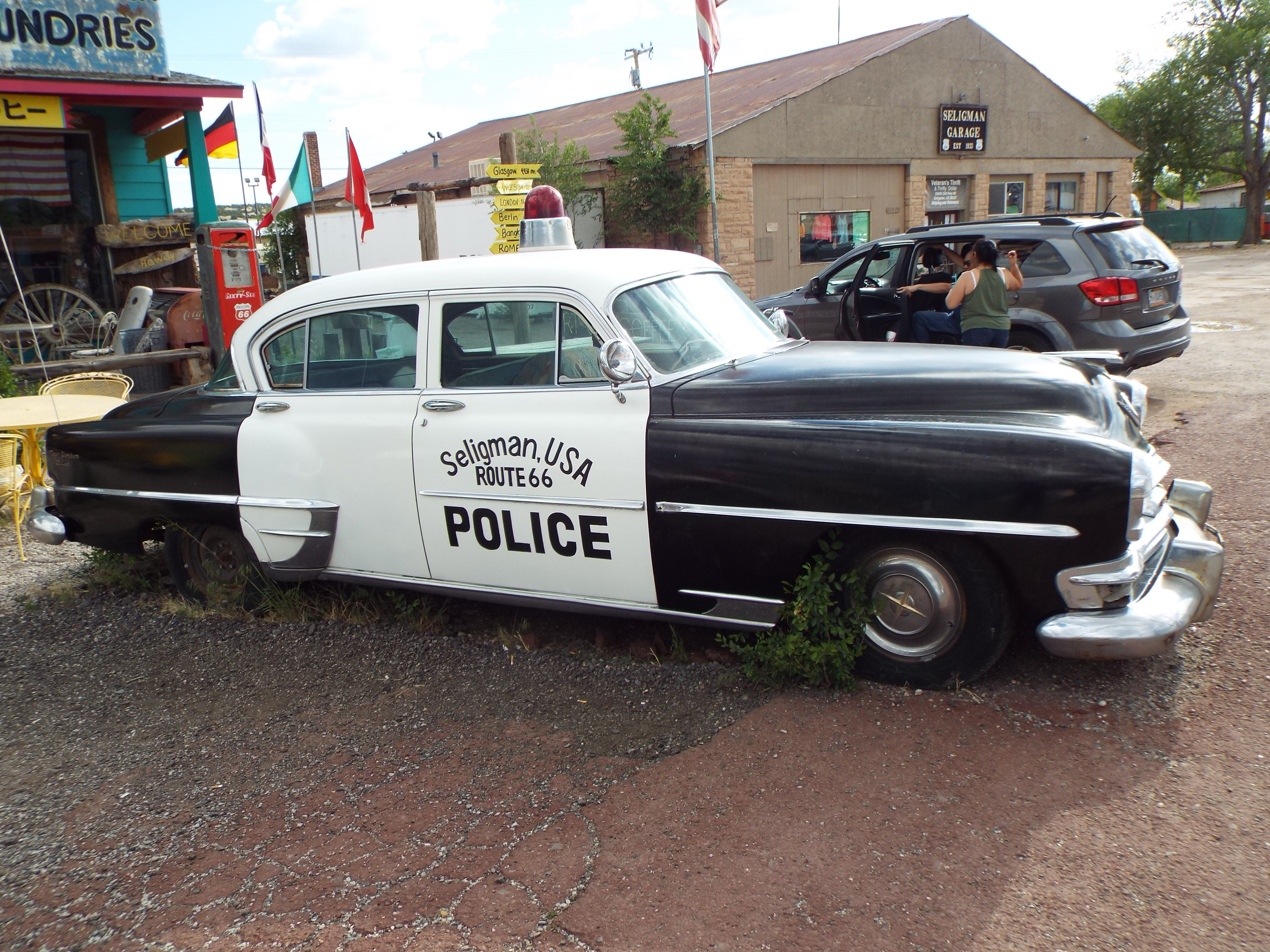
Historic 1953 Chrysler New Yorker Police car in Seligman

=== Seligman Depot ===
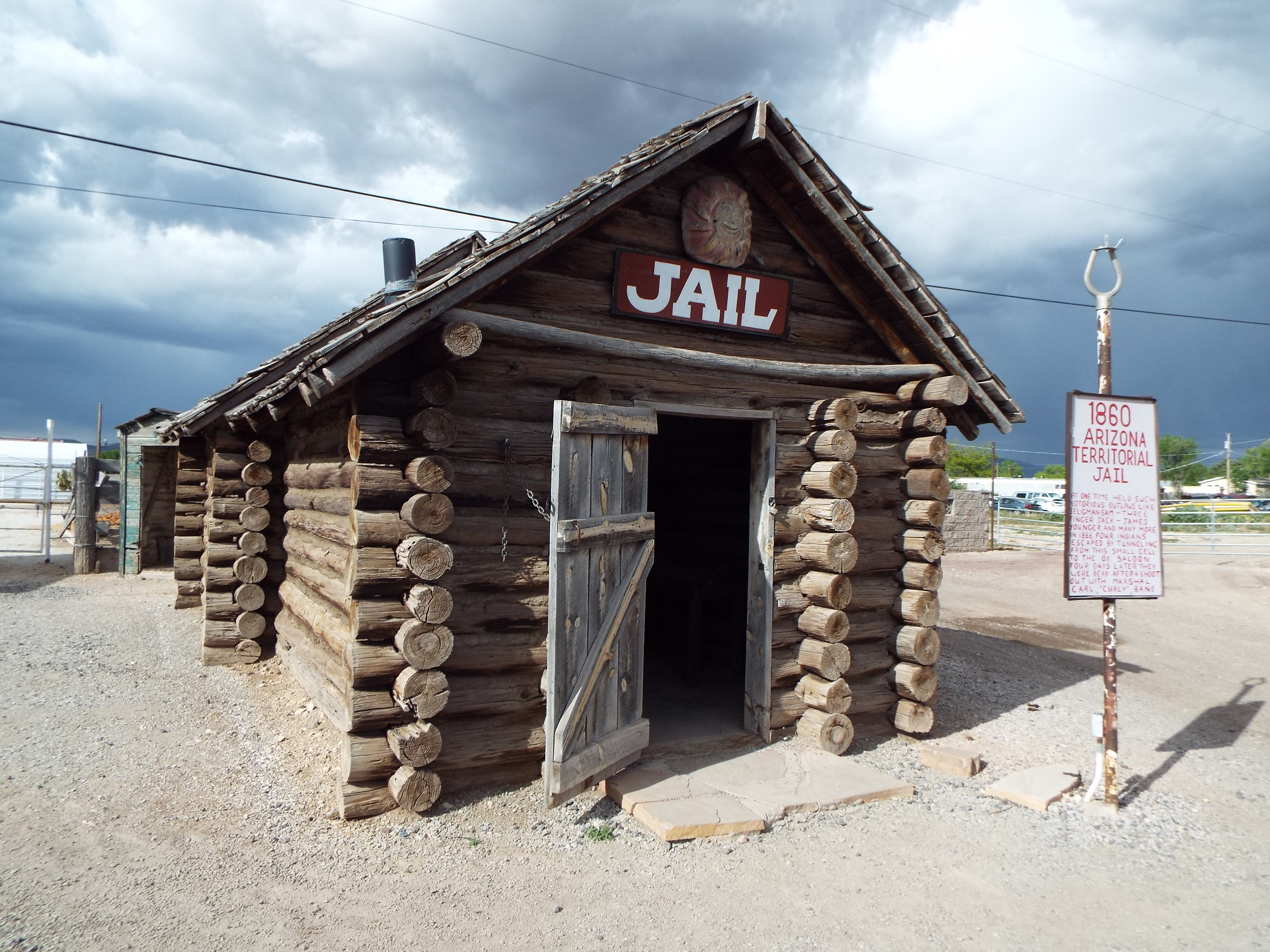
Territorial Jail (unauthentic)

At the western end of the town, directly west of the Roadkill Cafe, is a western town facade labeled "Seligman Depot" It includes 5 storefronts: A Livery, a "Tonsorial Parlor" (dentist), a hotel, a gun shop, and a Wells Fargo bank. There are no actual businesses residing behind the storefronts. Between this "Depot" and the Roadkill Cafe is a log cabin with the word "JAIL" painted in white above the doorway; in front of the cabin is a painted metal sign which declares the cabin to be "1860 Arizona Territorial Jail". The sign further states: At one time, held such notorious outlaws like – Seligman Sam – Three Finger Jack – James Younger and many more in 1866 four indians escaped by tunneling from this small cell to the OK saloon. Four days later they were dead after a shootout with Marshal Carl "Curly" Bane. Behind the "jail" is a corral that holds a buffalo for tourist viewing during the summer months.

The "Seligman Depot" and the "1860 Arizona Territorial Jail" are not authentic historical buildings, but owned by the Roadkill Cafe owners and were built to attract tourists to the Cafe and the attached "OK Saloon". Note that Arizona Territory did not exist until 1863, and Seligman was not established until 1886 (per the city sign at the edge of town). Marshal Carl "Curly" Bane, the Indian jail escape and the list of outlaws are also fictitious. There are no local or other documents claiming any authenticity to any of the property; visitors are simply left to believe what they wish of the park.

== Demographics ==
Historical population
Census	Pop.	Note	%±
2000	456		—
2010	445		−2.4%
2020	446		0.2%
U.S. Decennial Census

As of the census of 2000, there were 456 people, 205 households, and 121 families residing in the CDP. The population density was 71.5/sq mi (27.6/km^{2}). There were 281 housing units at an average density of 44.0/sq mi (17.0/km^{2}). The racial makeup of the CDP was 85% White, <1% Black or African American, 2% Native American, 2% Asian, <1% Pacific Islander, 6% from other races, and 5% from two or more races. Hispanic or Latino of any race were 19% of the population.

There were 205 households, out of which 29% had children under the age of 18 living with them, 45% were married couples living together, 11% had a female householder with no husband present, and 41% were non-families. 37% of all households were made up of individuals, and 17% had someone living alone who was 65 years of age or older. The average household size was 2.2 and the average family size was 2.9.

In the CDP, the population was spread out, with 27% under the age of 18, 5% from 18 to 24, 25% from 25 to 44, 24% from 45 to 64, and 19% who were 65 years of age or older. The median age was 41 years. For every 100 females, there were 96.6 males. For every 100 females age 18 and over, there were 94.8 males.

The median income for a household in the CDP was US$23,833, and the median income for a family was US$29,722. Males had a median income of US$27,083 versus US$13,594 for females. The per capita income for the CDP was US$11,976. About 14% of families and 17% of the population were below the poverty line, including 19% of those under age 18 and 17% of those age 65 or over.

== Education ==
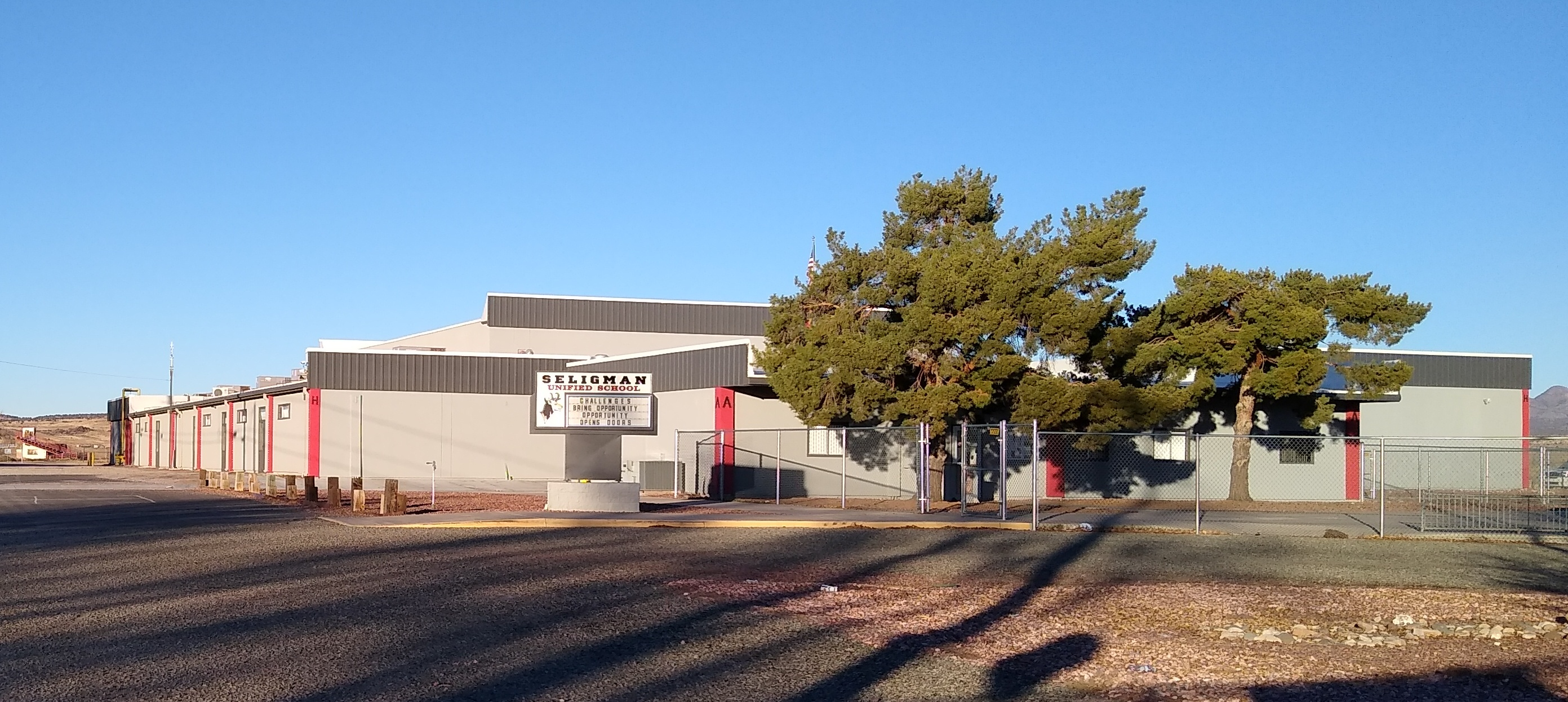
Seligman Unified School

Seligman is within the Seligman Unified School District.

The Seligman High School colors are red, white, and black, and its teams are called the Antelopes. The basketball team won the 1-A state championship in 2006 after consecutive second-round exits in the tournament in the two previous years. As well, its baseball team has lost in the final game of the state championship for three straight years.

== In popular culture ==
The town of Radiator Springs in Pixar's Cars franchise is loosely based on Seligman. While researching the history of Route 66, John Lasseter, director of the first two Cars films, met Seligman barber Angel Delgadillo, who told him how traffic through the town virtually disappeared on the day that nearby Interstate 40 opened.

== Climate ==
According to the Köppen Climate Classification system, Sunset Crater has a cold semi-arid climate, abbreviated "BSk" on climate maps.

Climate data for Seligman, Arizona (1991–2020 normals, extremes 1904–present)
Month	Jan	Feb	Mar	Apr	May	Jun	Jul	Aug	Sep	Oct	Nov	Dec	Year
Record high °F (°C)	79 (26)	78 (26)	90 (32)	92 (33)	99 (37)	107 (42)	110 (43)	106 (41)	104 (40)	98 (37)	85 (29)	75 (24)	110 (43)
Mean maximum °F (°C)	66.8 (19.3)	69.8 (21.0)	76.2 (24.6)	83.9 (28.8)	91.3 (32.9)	99.6 (37.6)	101.9 (38.8)	98.8 (37.1)	93.9 (34.4)	86.2 (30.1)	76.5 (24.7)	66.9 (19.4)	103.0 (39.4)
Mean daily maximum °F (°C)	53.9 (12.2)	57.4 (14.1)	64.0 (17.8)	70.8 (21.6)	79.3 (26.3)	89.9 (32.2)	92.8 (33.8)	90.7 (32.6)	85.3 (29.6)	75.0 (23.9)	63.0 (17.2)	53.1 (11.7)	72.9 (22.7)
Daily mean °F (°C)	38.9 (3.8)	41.3 (5.2)	46.6 (8.1)	52.3 (11.3)	60.1 (15.6)	69.2 (20.7)	75.1 (23.9)	73.4 (23.0)	67.2 (19.6)	56.6 (13.7)	46.0 (7.8)	38.0 (3.3)	55.4 (13.0)
Mean daily minimum °F (°C)	23.8 (−4.6)	25.3 (−3.7)	29.1 (−1.6)	33.8 (1.0)	40.8 (4.9)	48.5 (9.2)	57.4 (14.1)	56.2 (13.4)	49.0 (9.4)	38.2 (3.4)	29.0 (−1.7)	22.9 (−5.1)	37.8 (3.2)
Mean minimum °F (°C)	8.4 (−13.1)	12.5 (−10.8)	18.1 (−7.7)	22.6 (−5.2)	29.6 (−1.3)	38.0 (3.3)	47.7 (8.7)	47.5 (8.6)	37.6 (3.1)	25.7 (−3.5)	14.1 (−9.9)	9.2 (−12.7)	4.5 (−15.3)
Record low °F (°C)	−18 (−28)	−12 (−24)	3 (−16)	10 (−12)	14 (−10)	26 (−3)	33 (1)	34 (1)	26 (−3)	12 (−11)	−5 (−21)	−17 (−27)	−18 (−28)
Average precipitation inches (mm)	1.10 (28)	1.15 (29)	0.96 (24)	0.47 (12)	0.34 (8.6)	0.24 (6.1)	1.83 (46)	2.14 (54)	1.22 (31)	1.04 (26)	0.68 (17)	0.88 (22)	12.05 (303.7)
Average snowfall inches (cm)	3.0 (7.6)	2.1 (5.3)	1.2 (3.0)	0.4 (1.0)	0.0 (0.0)	0.0 (0.0)	0.0 (0.0)	0.0 (0.0)	0.0 (0.0)	0.1 (0.25)	0.9 (2.3)	2.1 (5.3)	9.8 (25)
Average precipitation days (≥ 0.01 in)	4.0	4.4	3.9	2.2	2.4	1.3	7.3	7.3	4.3	3.1	2.1	4.0	46.3
Average snowy days (≥ 0.1 in)	1.5	1.3	0.8	0.3	0.0	0.0	0.0	0.0	0.0	0.1	0.3	1.4	5.7
Source: NOAA

== Notable person ==
- Commodore Perry Owens – Old West gunfighter and lawman
