= Peach Springs Unified School District =

School district in Arizona, United States

Address
- 403 Diamond Creek Road Peach Springs, Arizona, 86434; United States

District information
- Type: Public
- Grades: PreK–8
- NCES District ID: 0406120

Students and staff
- Students: 161
- Teachers: 12.0
- Staff: 12.0
- Student–teacher ratio: 13.42

Other information
- Website: www.psusd8.org

The Peach Springs Unified School District is the school district in Peach Springs, Arizona. It consists of one elementary and middle / high school, Music Mountain Junior/Senior High School. . As of 2009 all of the students are of the Hualapai American Indian people.

== See also ==
- Non-high school district
