= Music Mountain Junior/Senior High School =

Defunct school in Peach Springs, Arizona

Coordinates: 35°32′04″N 113°25′32″W

Music Mountain Junior/Senior High School is a junior and senior high school in Peach Springs, Arizona. It was established in 2001 and was closed in 2008. Starting in 2022, the school was reopened and is again serving the community of Peach Springs. It is part of the Peach Springs Unified School District, which currently has an Elementary, Junior/Senior High School and an Arizona Online Academy (AOI) called Music Mountain Academy.

It was a former member of the Arizona Interscholastic Association, staying in its records through 2005. In that year, it enrolled 50 students in grades 9 through 12. Music Mountain Junior/Senior High School closed in 2008.
