= Winslow station (Arizona) =

Amtrak train station in Winslow, Arizona, US

Winslow, AZ
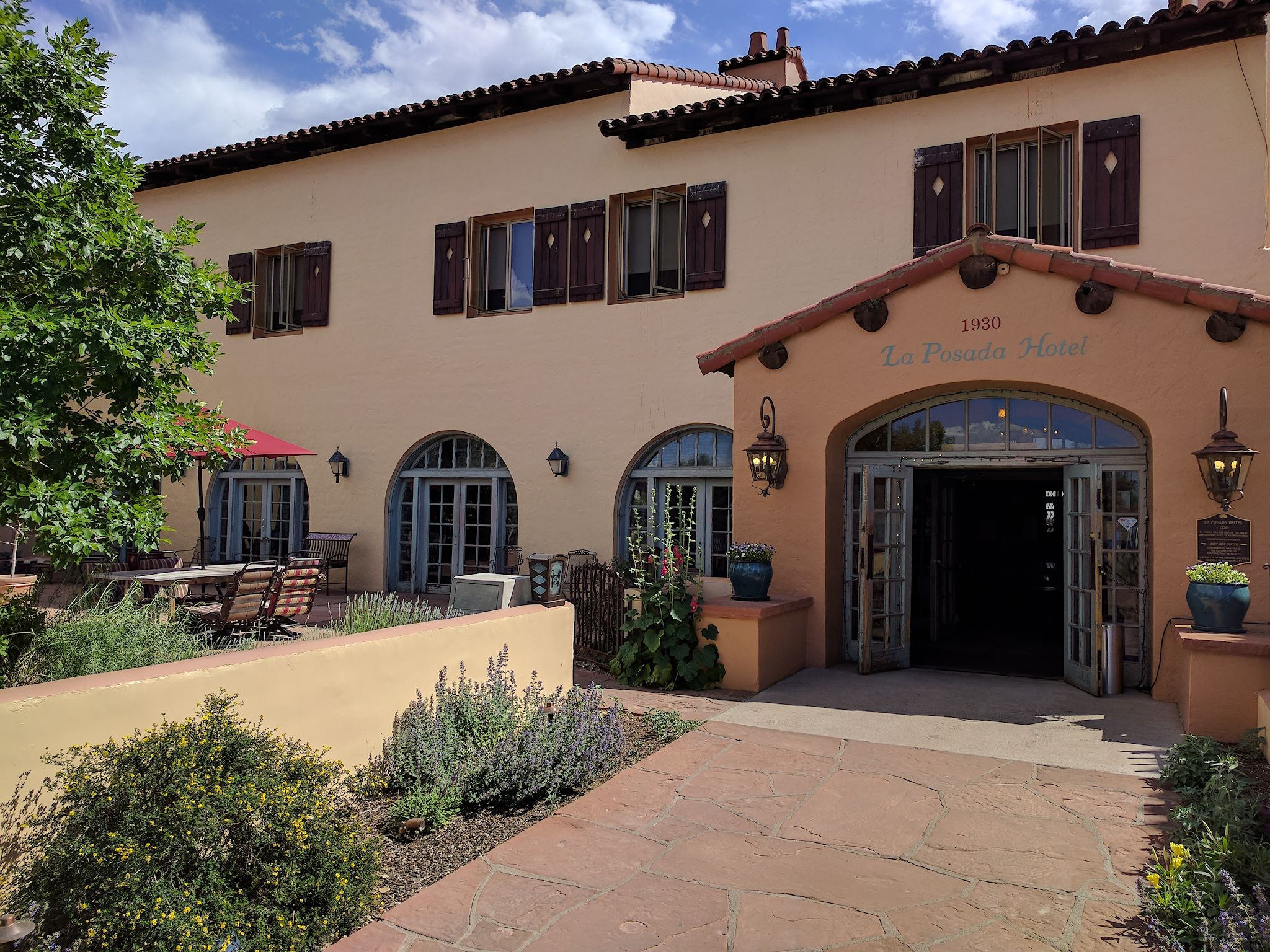
- Entrance to La Posada Hotel

General information
- Location: 303 East Second Street, Winslow, Arizona 86047
- Coordinates: 35.0208°N 110.6946°W
- Line: BNSF Gallup / Seligman Subdivisions
- Platforms: 1 side platform, 1 island platform
- Tracks: 5

Other information
- Station code: Amtrak: WLO

History
- Rebuilt: April 1929–May 18, 1930

Passengers
- FY 2025: 3,769 (Amtrak)

Services
Preceding station	Amtrak	Following station
Flagstaff toward Los Angeles	Southwest Chief	Gallup toward Chicago
Former services
Preceding station	Atchison, Topeka and Santa Fe Railway	Following station
Canyon Diablo toward Los Angeles	Main Line	Joseph City toward Chicago

U.S. Historic district – Contributing property
- Official name: Winslow Santa Fe station
- Designated: March 31, 1992
- Part of: La Posada Historic District
- Reference no.: 92000256
- Architectural style: Mission Revival/Spanish Colonial Revival
Location

Winslow station is an Amtrak train station at 303 East Second Street in Winslow, Navajo County, Arizona, United States. It is served daily by Amtrak's Southwest Chief between Chicago, Illinois and Los Angeles, California. The Santa Fe Depot and La Posada Hotel Harvey House compound are the centerpiece of the La Posada Historic District (established 1992).

== Architecture ==
The Santa Fe Railway station was built in 1929, and the adjacent La Posada Hotel and Gardens was completed in 1930.

Both were designed by renowned architect Mary Jane Colter. She was the architect of various notable Fred Harvey Company buildings, including others at the South Rim of the Grand Canyon and in New Mexico. She considered La Posada Hotel as her integrated interior/exterior masterpiece.

=== Hotel ===
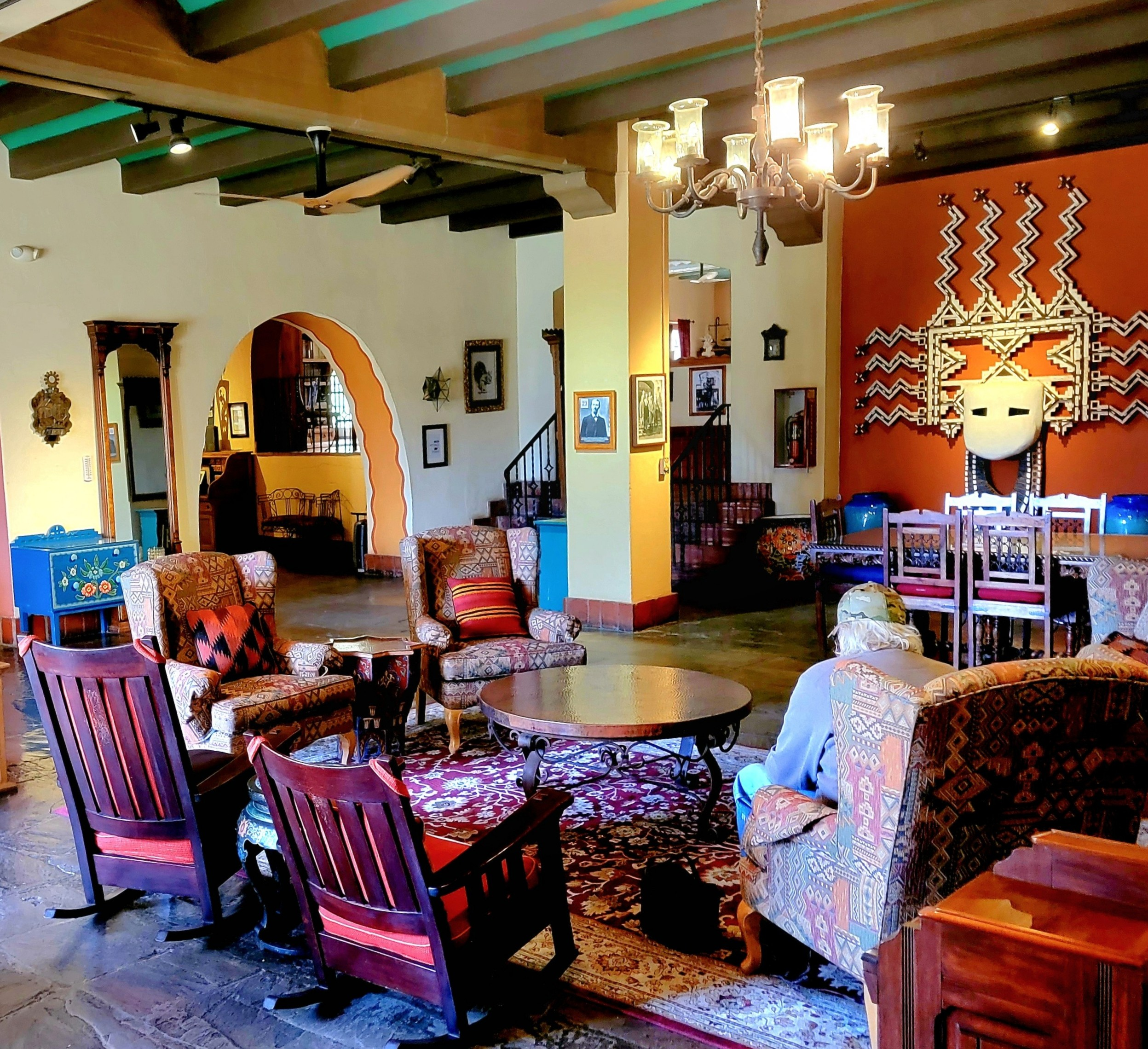
La Posada Hotel lobby lounge

La Posada Hotel, and the depot, combine elements of the Mission Revival and Spanish Colonial Revival architecture styles. Characteristic Colter designed features include shaded colonnades and arcades, restaurants, red clay tile roofs above massed stuccoed walls, courtyards and acres of gardens, custom furniture, and decorative wrought ironwork throughout.

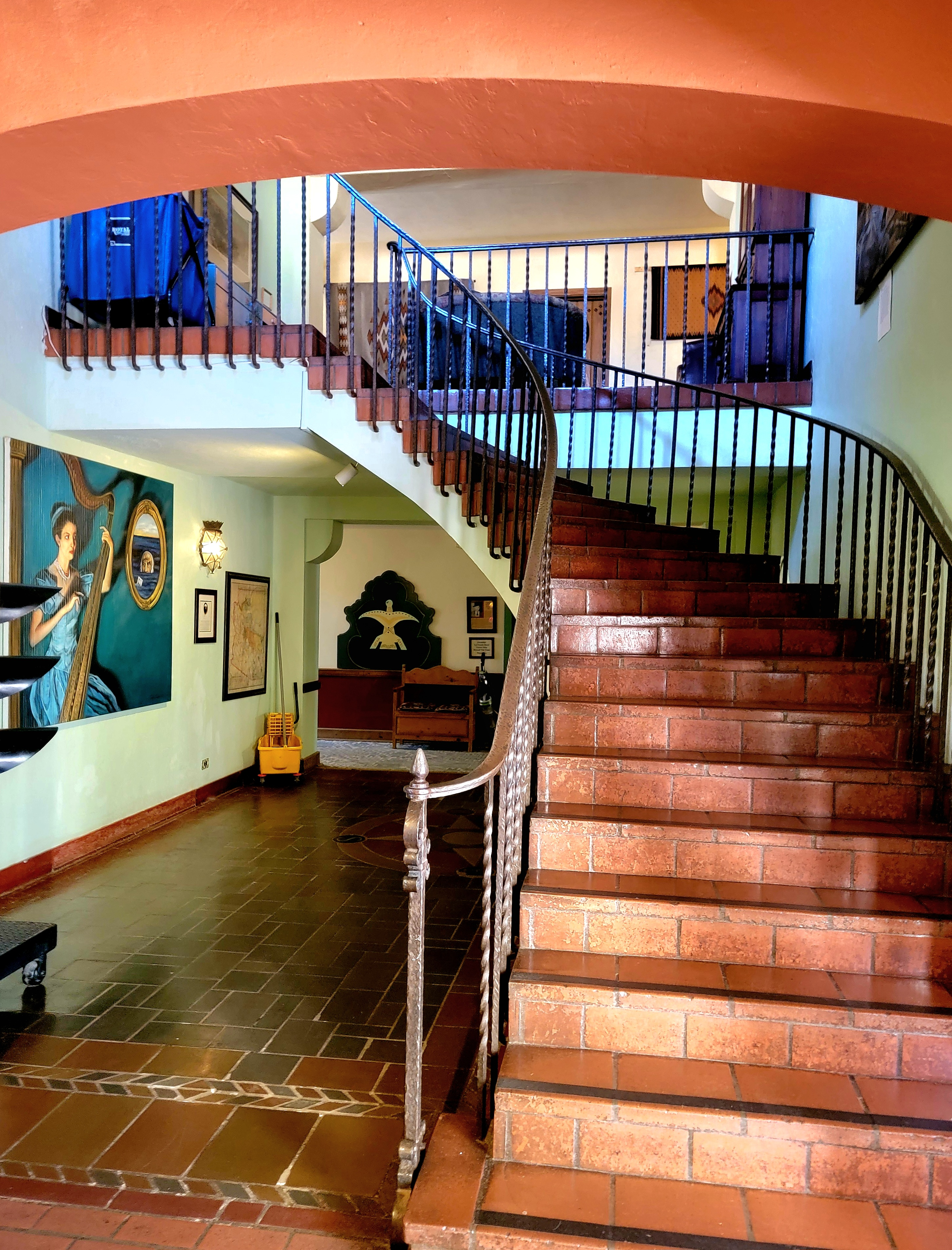
La Posada Hotel staircase

The hotel building has two main entrances, a southern one on the train platform and a northern one on the street for local people and U.S. Route 66 travelers.

La Posada is one of the last of a series of hotel-depot complexes built across the Southwestern United States in a collaboration between Fred Harvey and the Atchison, Topeka and Santa Fe Railway.

The hotel was closed in 1957, turned into railroad offices, and later abandoned.

Bought in 1997 to save it, it was substantially restored to reopen as a historic hotel and restaurant complex. Further restoration of the buildings and historic gardens is ongoing. A parking lot and field east of the hotel totaling 8 acres (3.2 ha) is being converted into a sculpture garden, orchard, and potager garden by the Winslow Arts Trust (WAT).

The Turquoise Room, the hotel's restaurant, was rated as one of the top 3 restaurants in the United States by Conde Naste in 2009. The Tina Mion Museum exhibits Mion's contemporary paintings in the hotel's former 3,000 square feet (280 m^{2}) ballroom.

La Posada Hotel is mentioned in the Lost Dogs song "Goodbye Winslow" about traveling Route 66, on their album Old Angel.

=== Depot ===
The Santa Fe Depot building once served as the Winslow Amtrak station. That station has been relocated into the main hotel building itself, and all access to the passenger platform is from there via the southern entrance. The Depot building was also renovated by the Winslow Arts Trust to house the Route 66 Art Museum, celebrating the culture of Winslow and the historic U.S. Route 66 in Arizona corridor. In June 2016, work began to convert the depot section into a fine art museum. It is presently known as the Affeldt Mion Museum (AMM). As of January 2026, the train platform is undergoing a complete rebuild, but the project is being done in segments to maintain Amtrak service.

== Downtown Winslow ==
Attractions near La Posada Hotel in adjacent historic Downtown Winslow include:

- Old Trails Museum, in a 1920 bank building.
- Snowdrift Art Space, in the 1914 Babbitt Brothers department store building.
- Standin' on the Corner Park
- Winslow Visitor Center, in the former 1917 Winslow Hubble Trading Post building.

== See also ==
- La Posada Historic District
- Mary Jane Colter Buildings
