= John Pugh (artist) =

American artist (born 1957)

John W. Pugh
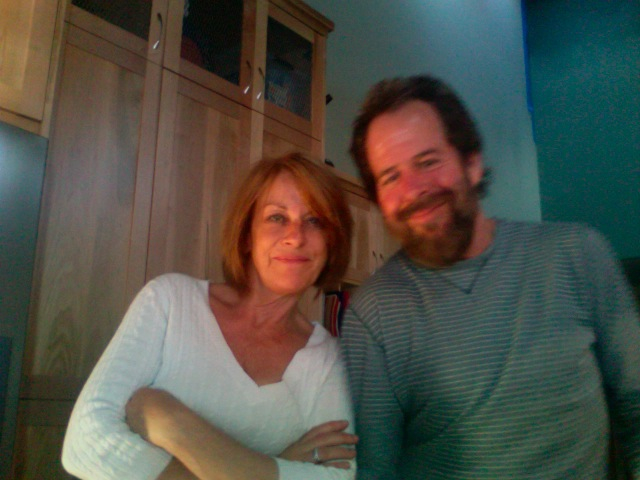
- John Pugh with fiancée Annie (February 2011)
- Born: May 2, 1957 (age 69); Lake Forest, Illinois
- Education: B.A. in Art (painting emphasis) 1983, California State University, Chico
- Occupation: Mural Artist
- Known for: Trompe-l'œil Murals, Paintings
- Style: trompe-l'œil
- Awards: Distinguished Alumni Chico State 2003, Master Mural artist award (Precita Eyes Mural Center) San Francisco, CA 2006

John Pugh (born 1957) is an American artist known for creating large trompe-l'œil wall murals giving the illusion of a three-dimensional scene behind the wall. Pugh has been creating his murals since the late 1970s. He attended California State University Chico, receiving his BA in 1983 and the Distinguished Alumni Award in 2003. He has received over 250 public and private commissions in the United States, Canada, Mexico, Barbados, Japan, Taiwan, and New Zealand. He currently lives and works in Ashland, Oregon. His particular style of trompe-l'œil painting has been called "Narrative Illusionism."

His works have been described as "not merely ornamental or curiously clever. They are thought-provoking, substantial, and sometimes even philosophical or spiritual. What separates the murals of John Pugh from their less consequential cousins is that he goes beyond trompe l’oeil by combining techniques of illusion with narrative or conceptual elements and thereby not only “fools the eye” but captures the imagination and engages the mind as well."

== Artist Statement ==
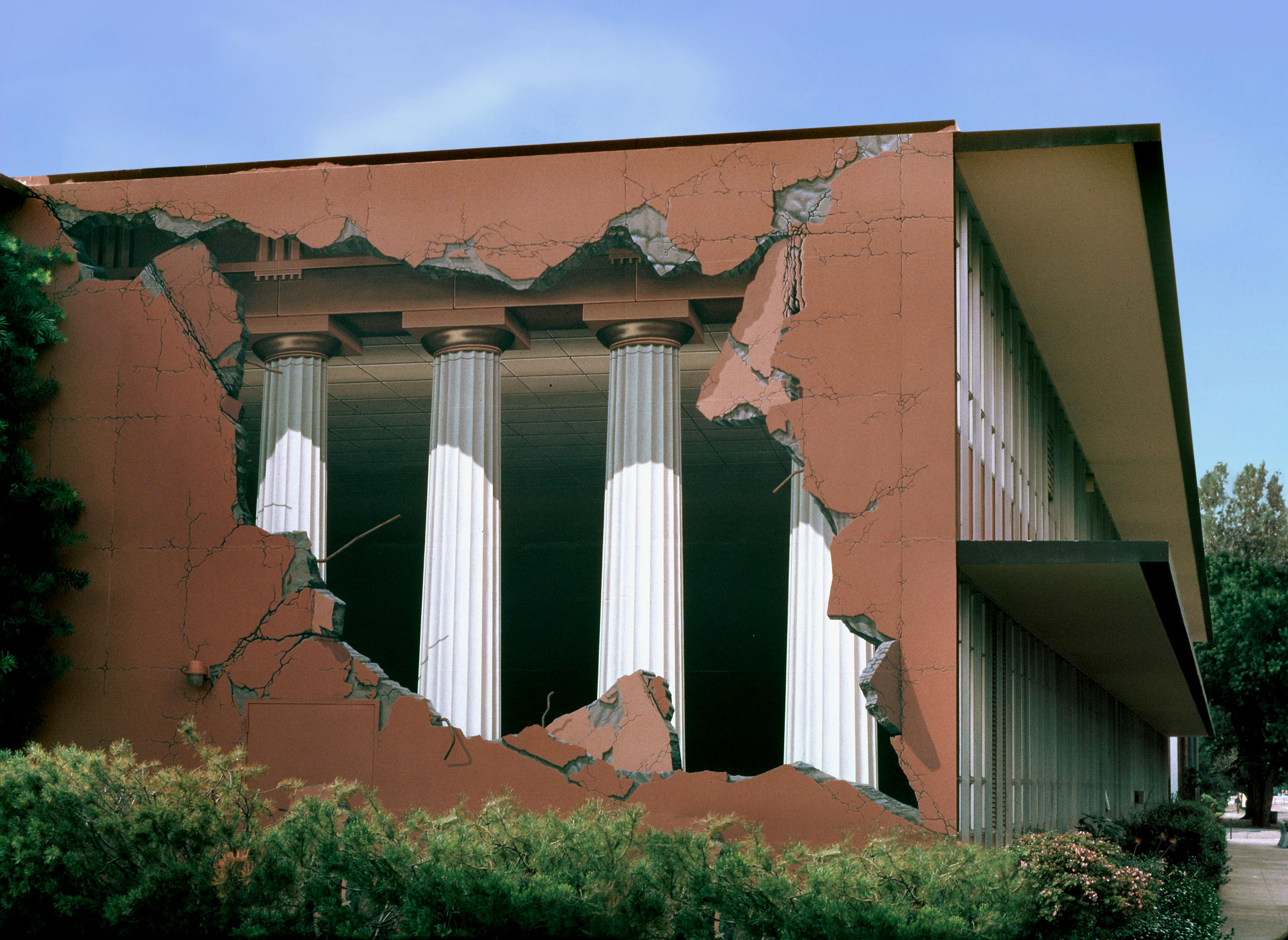
Trompe-l'œil mural at California State University, Chico titled Academe, featuring Doric columns and peeling walls, by John Pugh

"I am a trompe l’oeil artist focusing primarily on public art. I have found that the ‘language’ of life-size illusions allow me to effectively communicate with a very large audience. People take delight in being visually tricked. Once intrigued by the illusion, the viewer is invited to visually cross into the mural to explore and discover the deeper concept of the piece. I have also found that by creating architectural illusion that integrates with the existing environment both optically and aesthetically, the art transcends the separateness that public art sometimes produces.

Public art is a form of communication. For a concept to connect with viewers, the message is typically non-commercial. Public art can foster human connection, which can concurrently stimulate economic development.

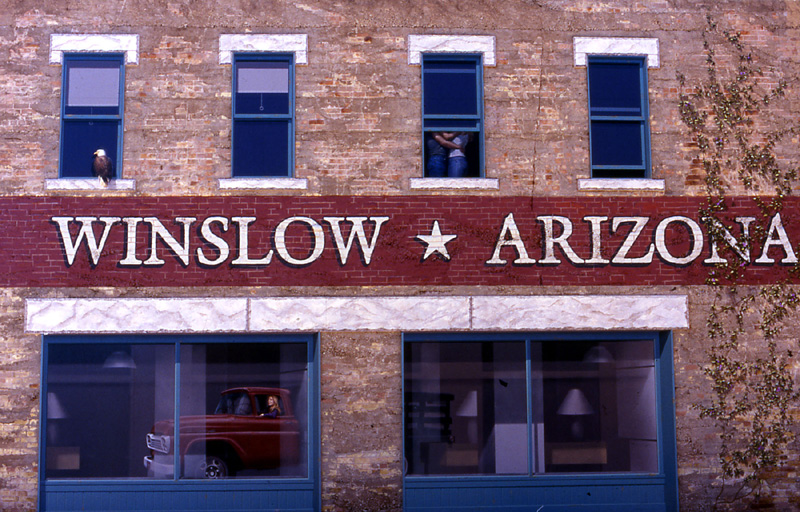
John Pugh's Slowin' Down to Take a Look mural, a tribute to the band the Eagles and the centerpiece of Standin' on the Corner Park in Winslow, AZ.

With a clear intention to create a public art attraction, I strive to design a mural in a way that is atypical or not in a commonplace mural format; that I “think of the box”. Often this includes creating an illusion that is iconic or a dynamic anomaly. The passerby is much more apt to engage with an uncommon architectural event or phenomenon while he or she unconsciously surveys the urban landscape.

Creating a ‘sense of place’ is paramount. It is important for me as an artist, to research the area and its community, formulating concepts based upon a multitude of historical, environmental, and cultural viewpoints. If the mural can serve to educate about the culture and heritage of a place, it will deepen roots, and create a pride of place. This inspires new possibilities, the sharing of ideas, and assist in bridging cultural gaps in the community.

Clarity of language allows the artwork to ‘elevate rather than alienate’, and with an initial trompe l’oeil impact that tantalizes the viewer, no translation is needed. Yet layers of heritage, the human spirit, or of dreams can be woven together in innovative ways — dynamic or subtle — that will inspire. I like to play with the mural composition so that the layers will unfold sequentially, creating a multi-dimensional narrative and prompting exploration. I also like to treat the layers as music, composing with color, texture, and form to create melodic overtones and the timbre. Ultimately the goal with the mural is to conjure fresh feelings and perceptions, and evoke a sense of connectivity with the mural, within us, and the world around us." -John Pugh

== Gallery of Murals ==
Partial listing of John Pugh's murals.

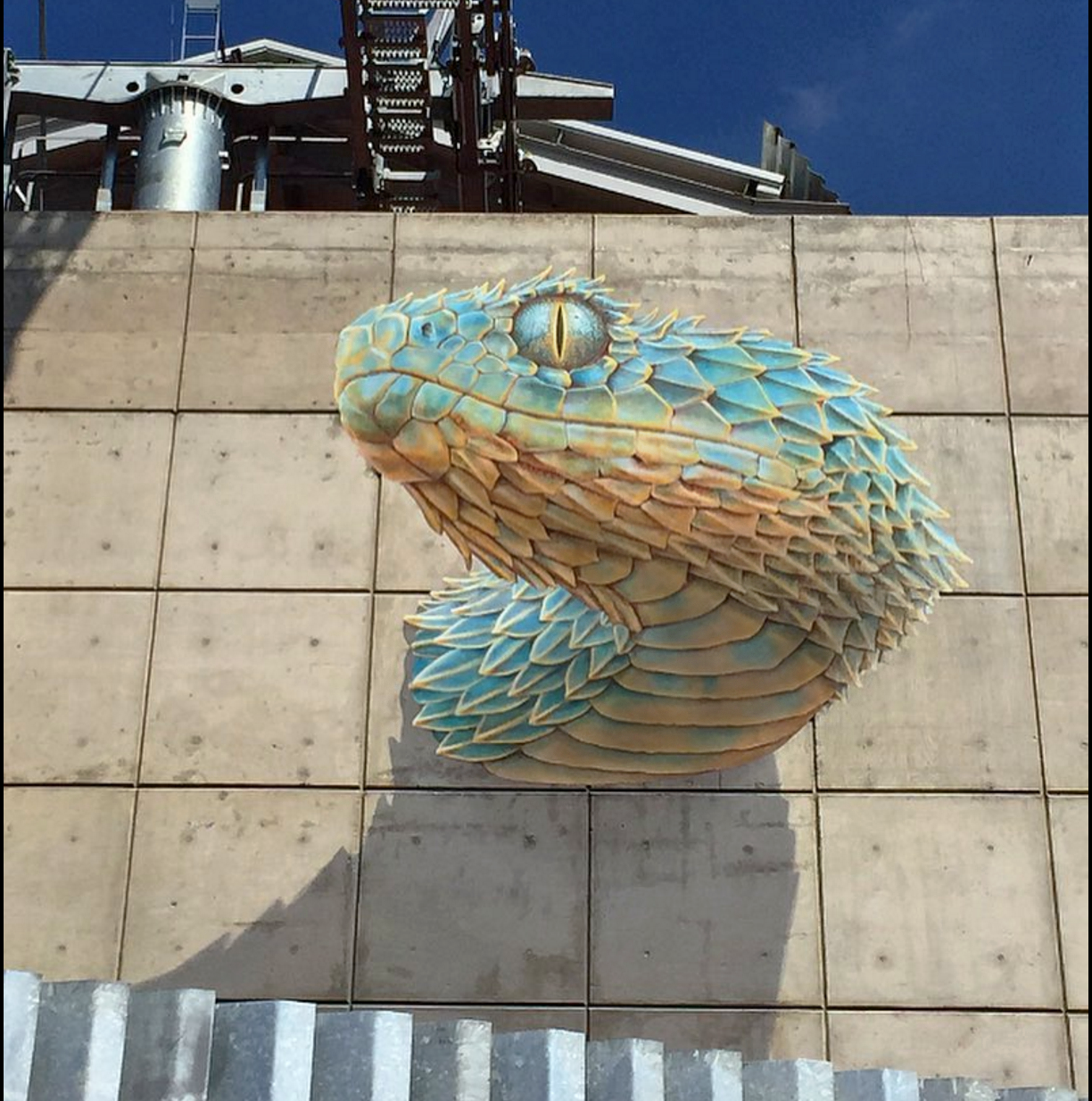
Quetzalcoatl, Ecatepec de Morelos, Méx., Mexico, 2016.

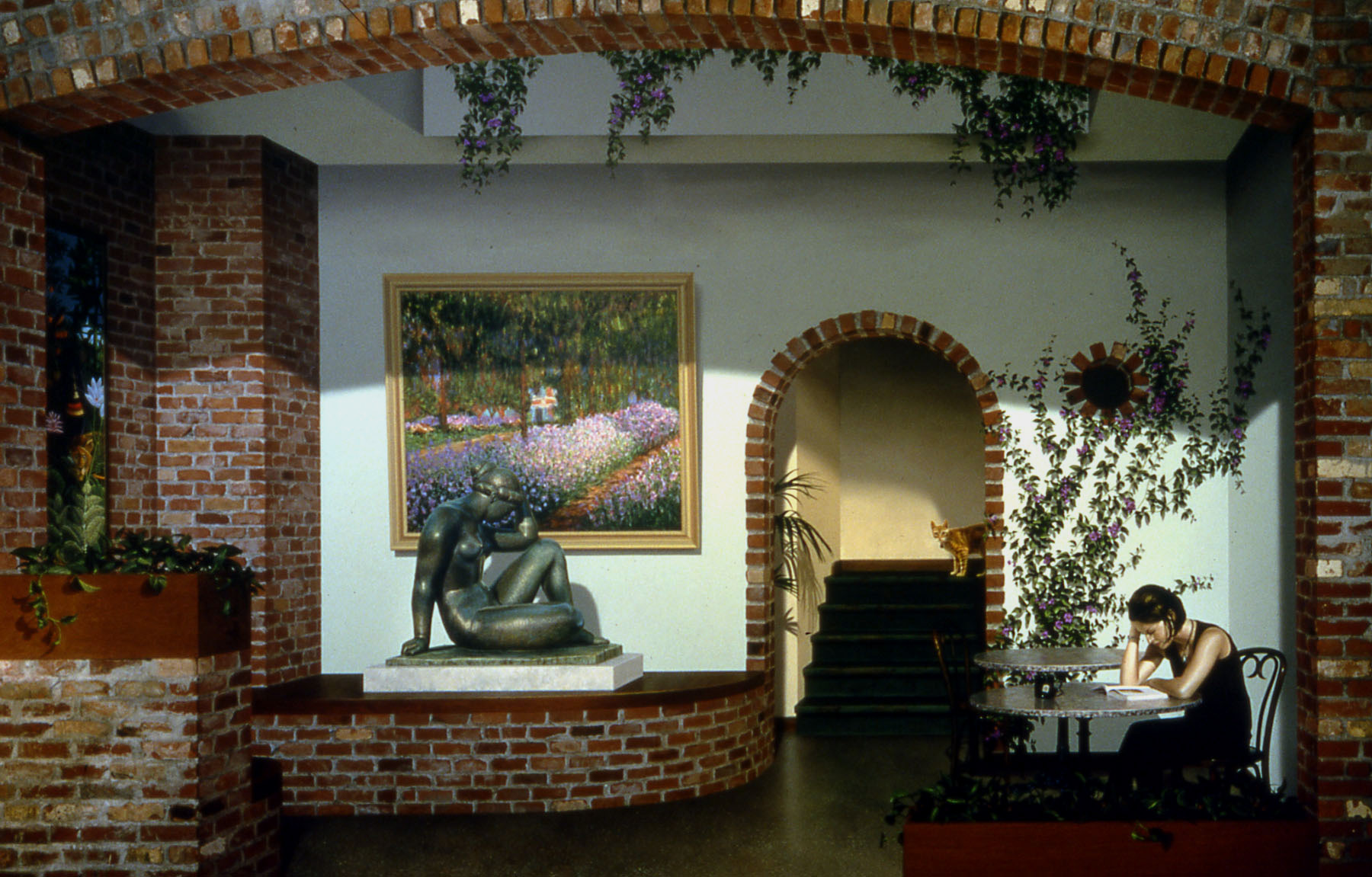
Art Imitating Life Imitating Art Imitating Life, Lindsay, CA, 1996

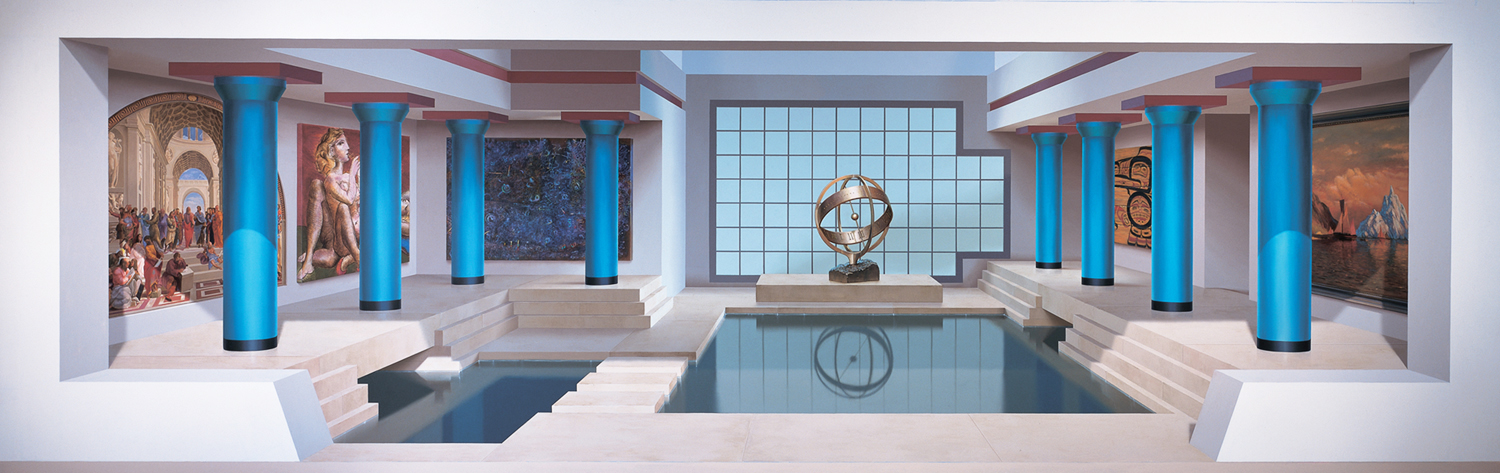
Pool of Thought, University of Alaska, Fairbanks, AK, 1999

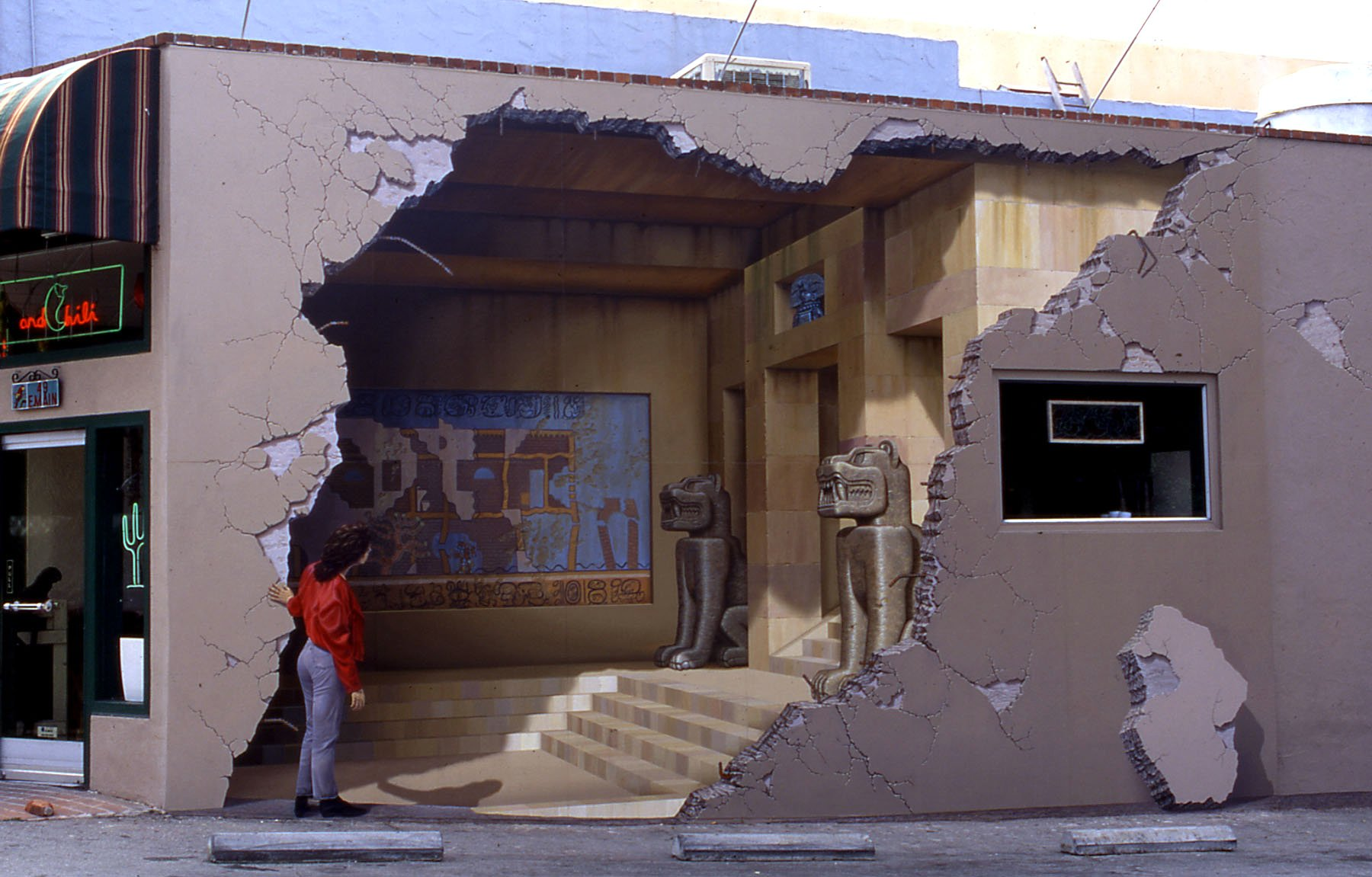
Siete Punto Uno, Los Gatos, CA, 1989

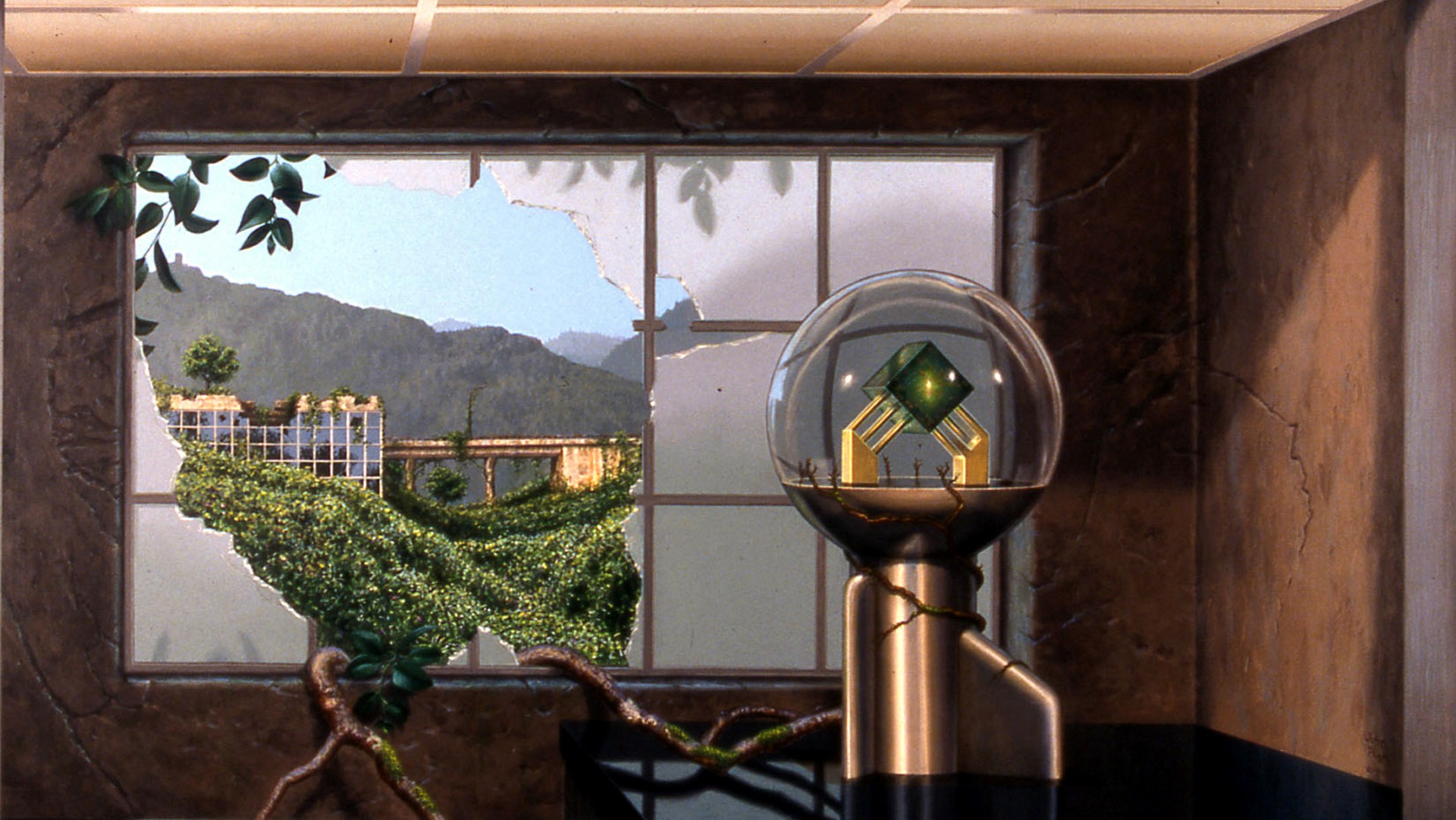
Technology of the Future Past, Los Gatos, CA, 1996

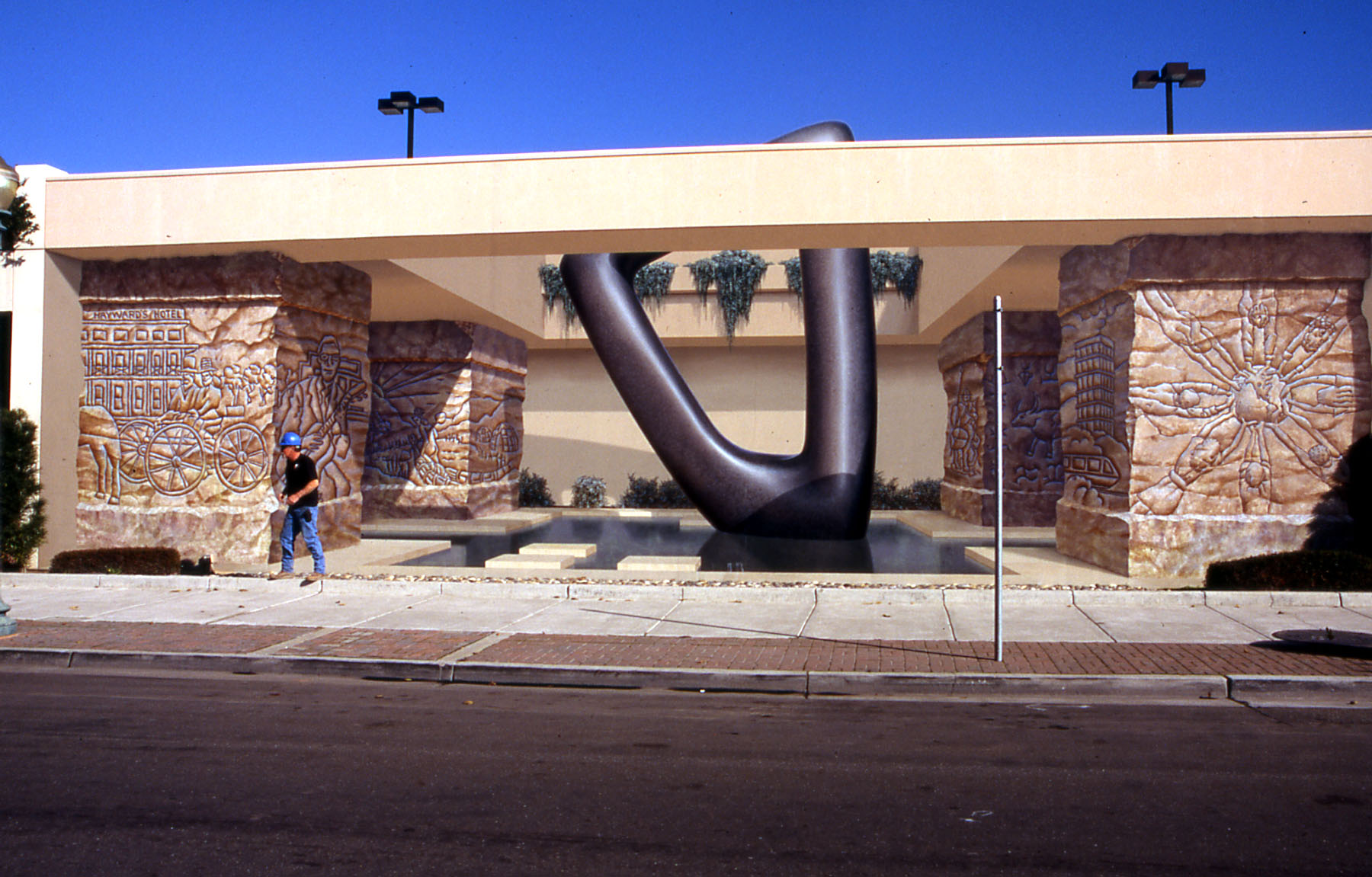
Internal Melody, Hayward, CA, 2000

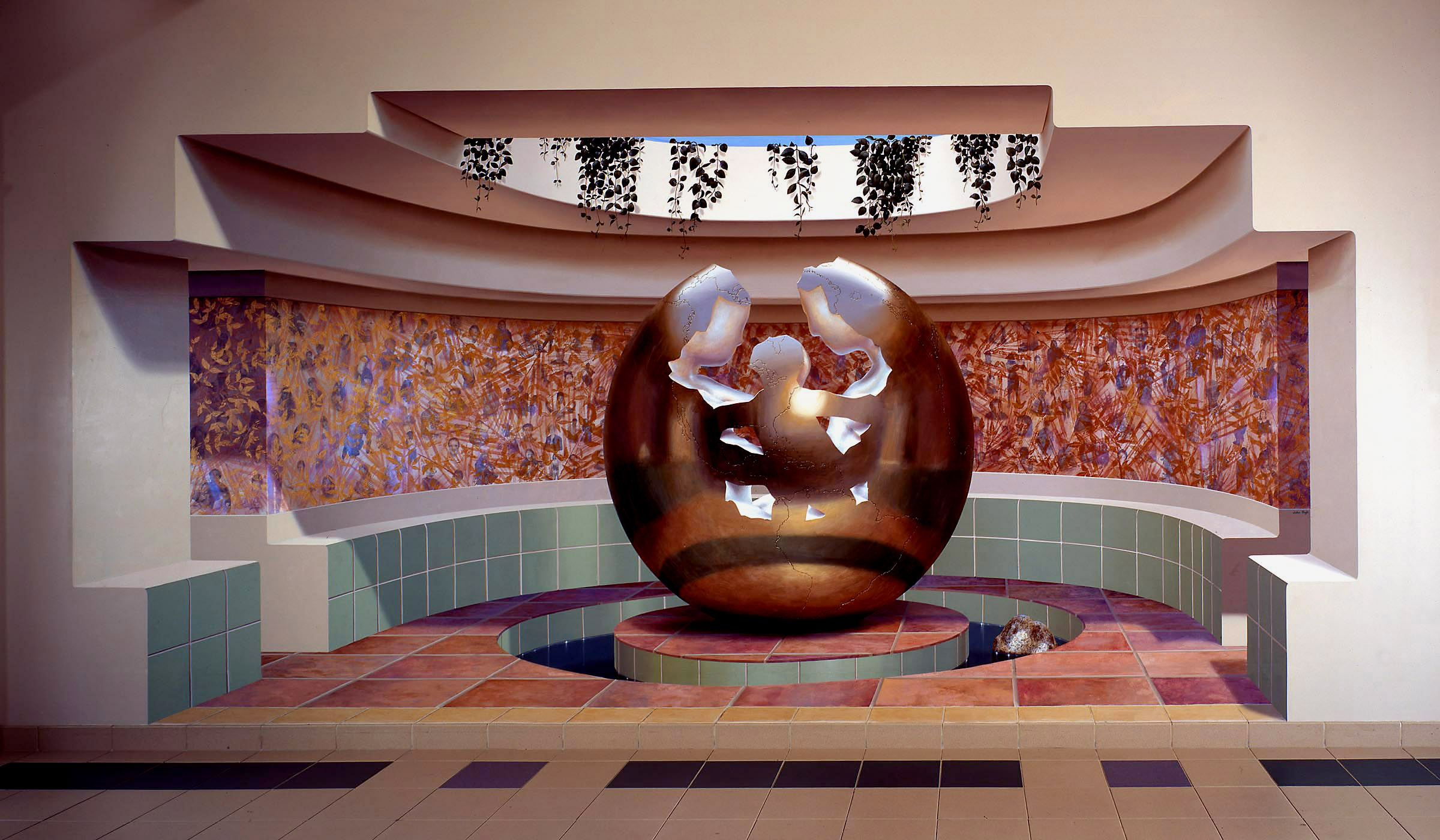
Seed, Sarasota County Health Center, Sarasota, FL, 2004

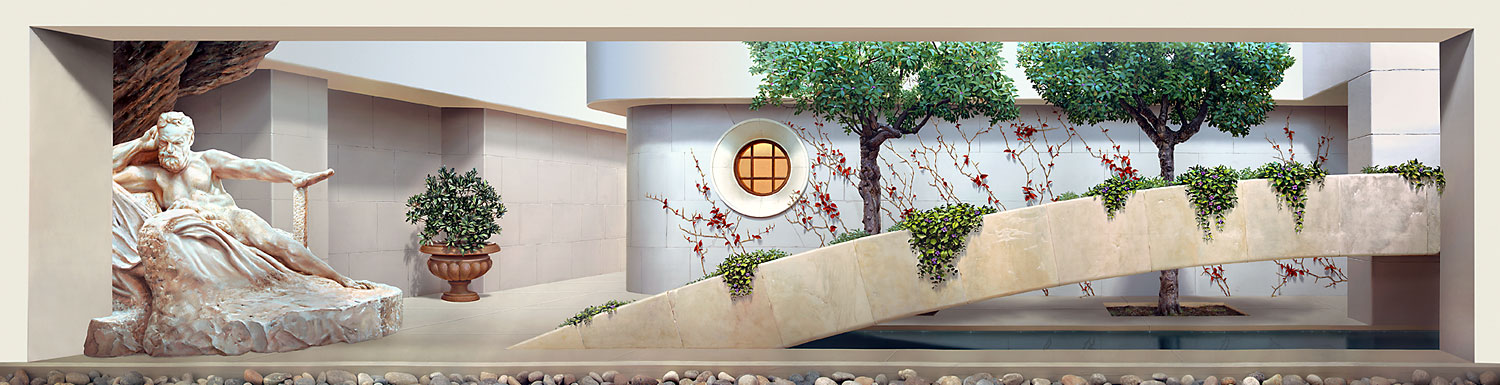
Light Walk, Palo Alto Medical Foundation, Palo Alto, CA, 2006

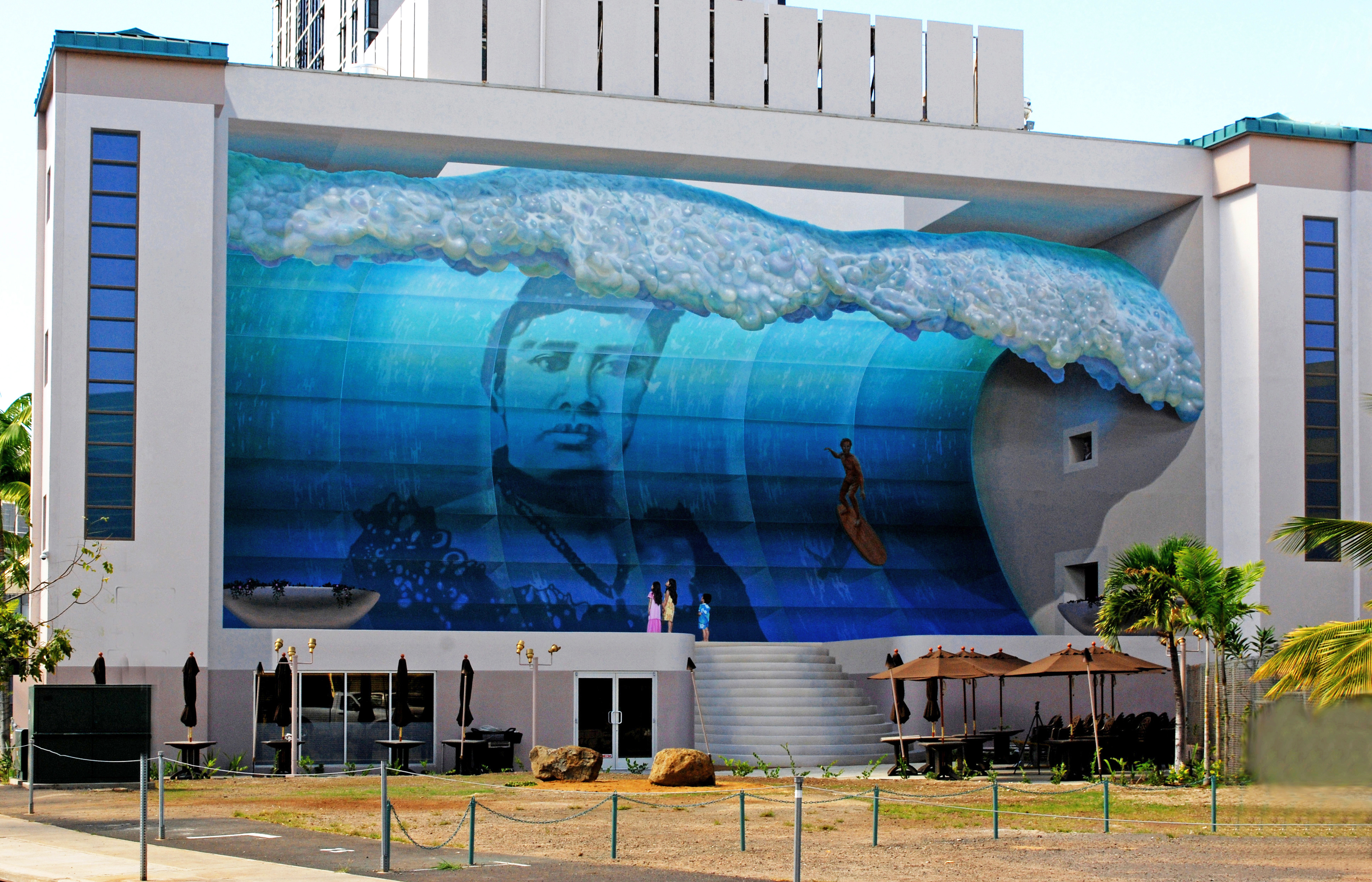
Mana Nalu, Honolulu, Hawaii, 2008

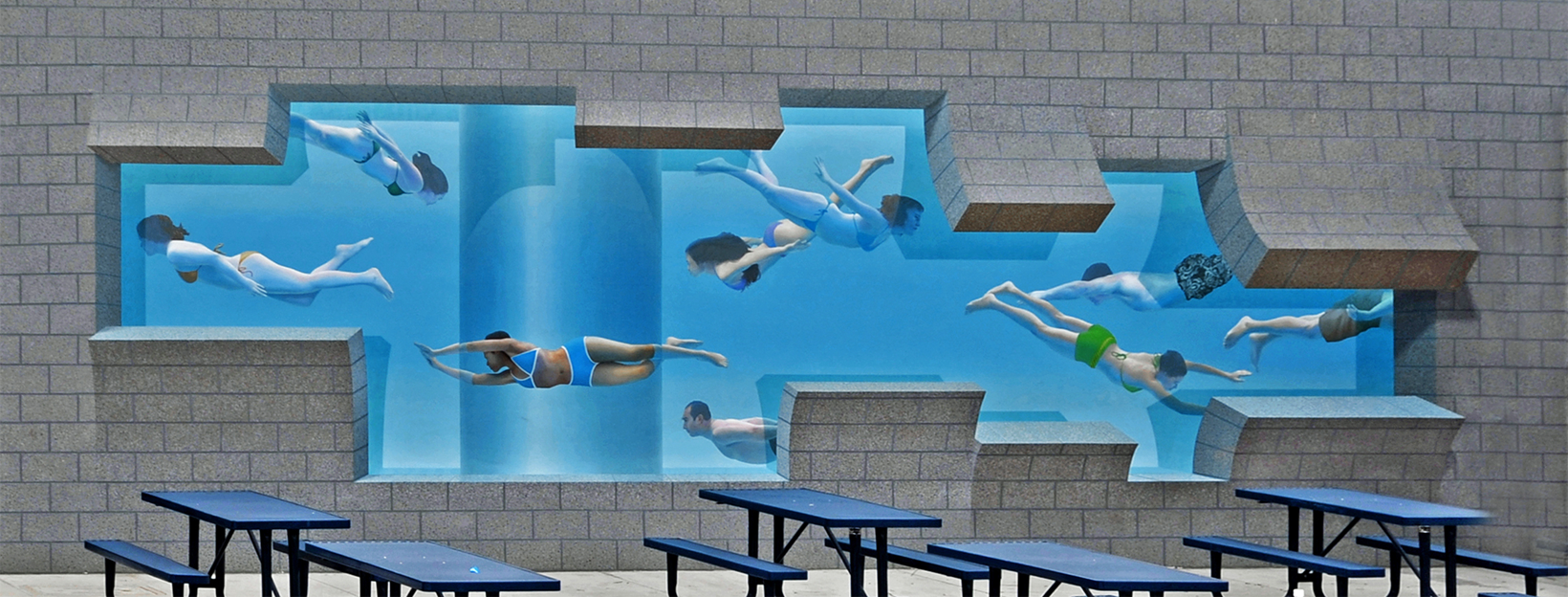
Underwater Life is Joy, Aqua Adventure Fremont Water Park, Fremont, CA, 2009

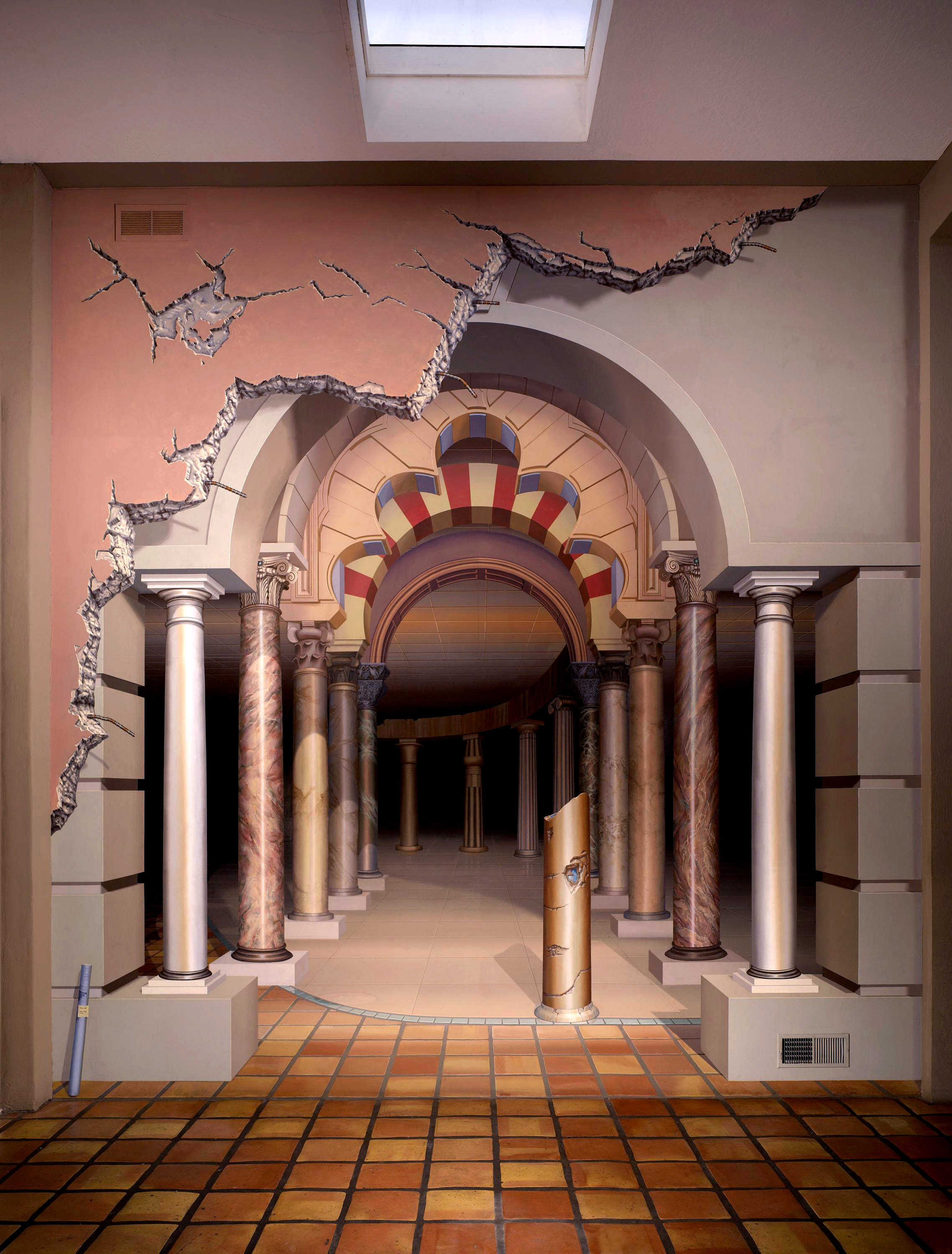
Colonnade, Los Gatos, CA, 1986

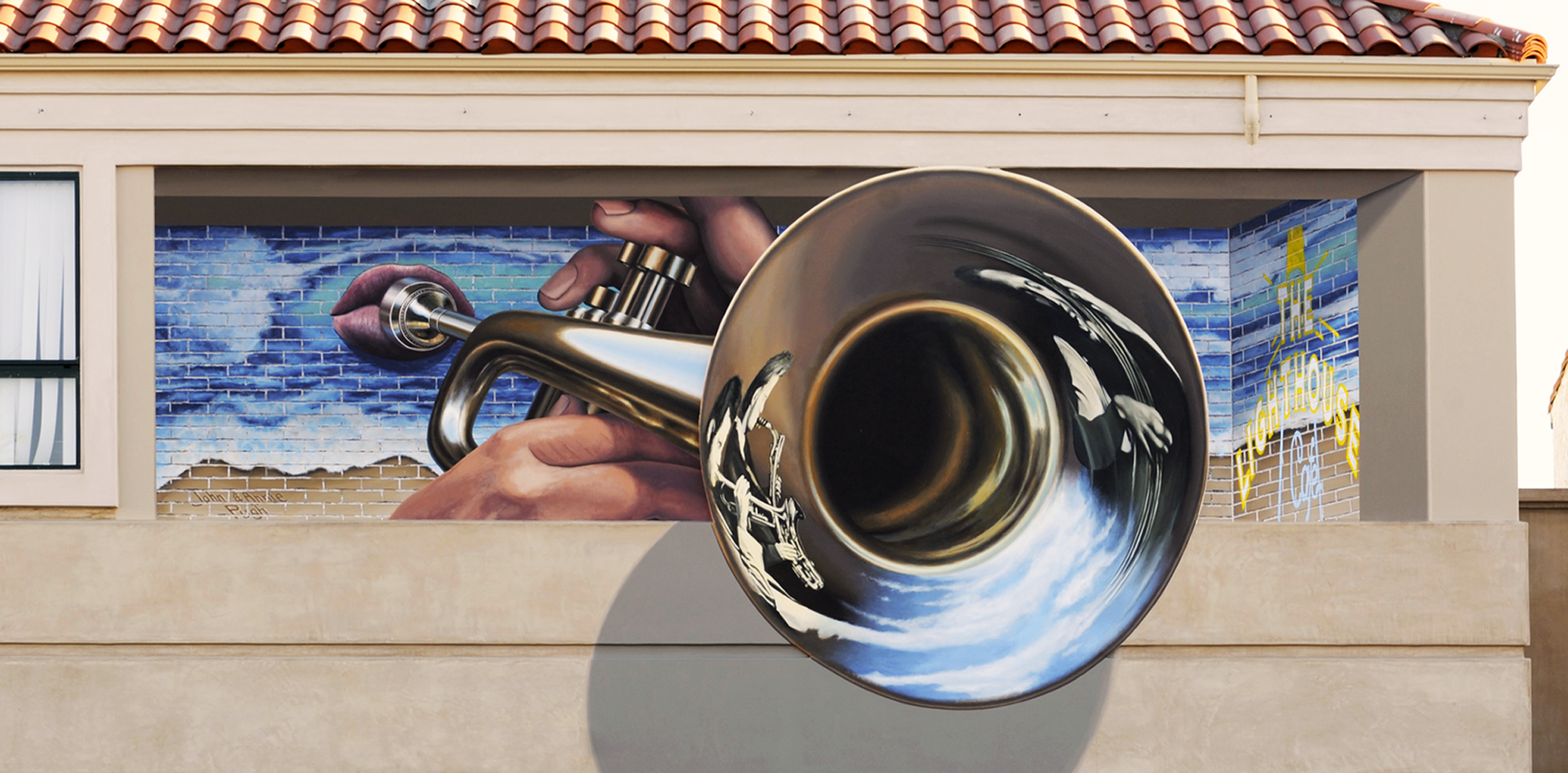
Key of C, Hermosa Beach, California, 2012

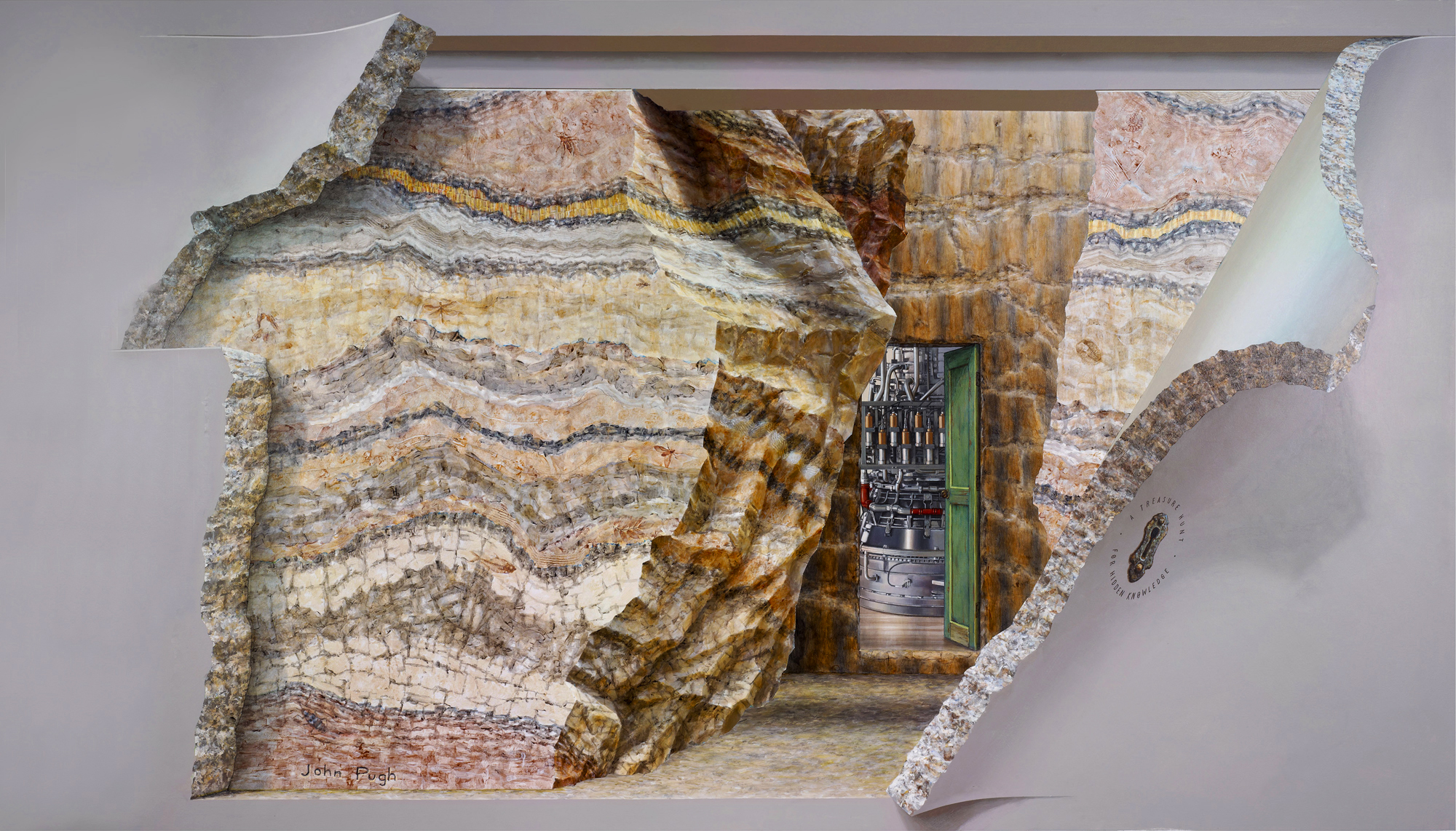
Wonderground, Los Angeles, CA, 2006

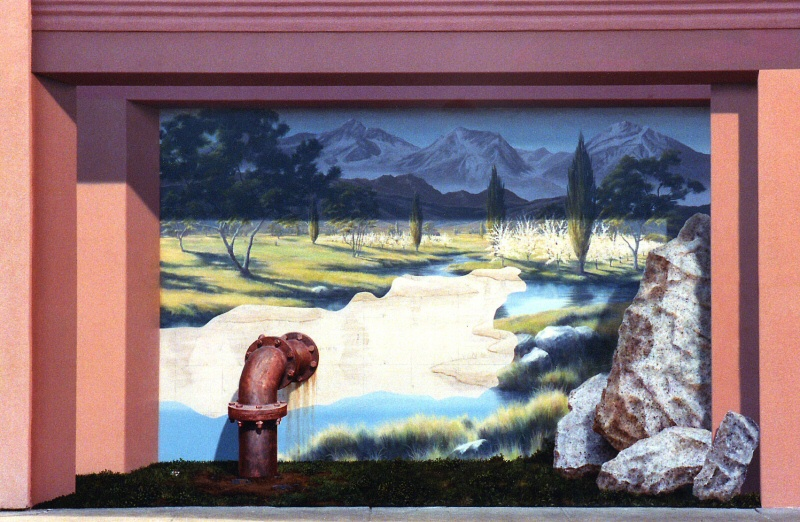
Drain, Eastern Sierra, Bishop, California, 2004

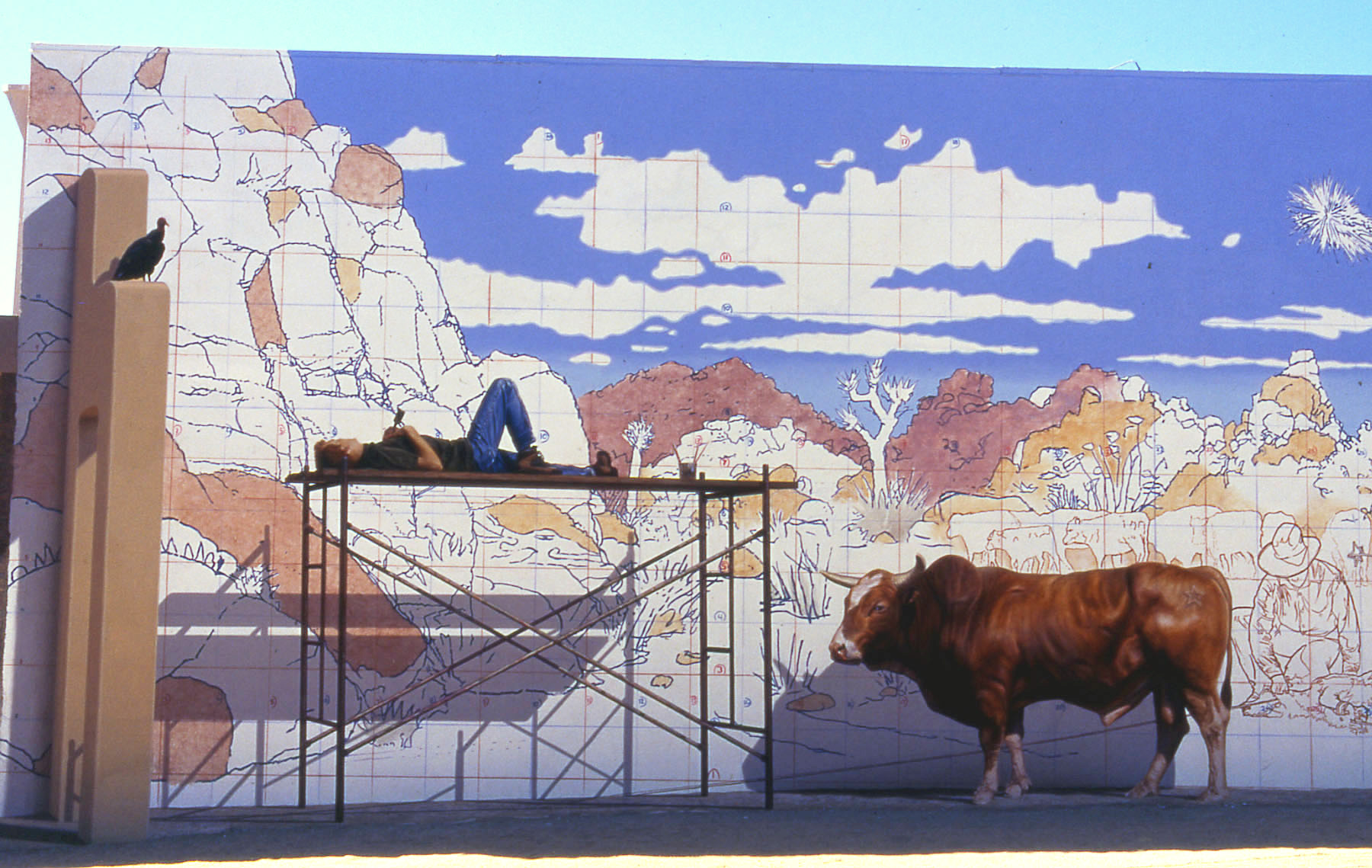
Valentine's Day, Twentynine Palms, CA, 2001

== See also ==
- Standin' on the Corner Park – discusses the Pugh mural by that name
- Trompe-l'œil
- Anamorphosis
- Murals
- Public art
