= Standing on the Corner =

Standing on the Corner may refer to:

- "Standing on the Corner" (show tune), 1956 song written by Frank Loesser
- "Standing on the Corner (Blue Yodel No. 9)", 1930 song by Jimmie Rodgers, featuring Louis Armstrong
- Standing on the Corner (band), an American experimental Jazz band

== See also ==
- Standin' on the Corner Park, a public park in Winslow, Arizona
