= La Posada Historic District =

Historic district in Arizona, United States

- U.S. National Register of Historic Places
- U.S. Historic district
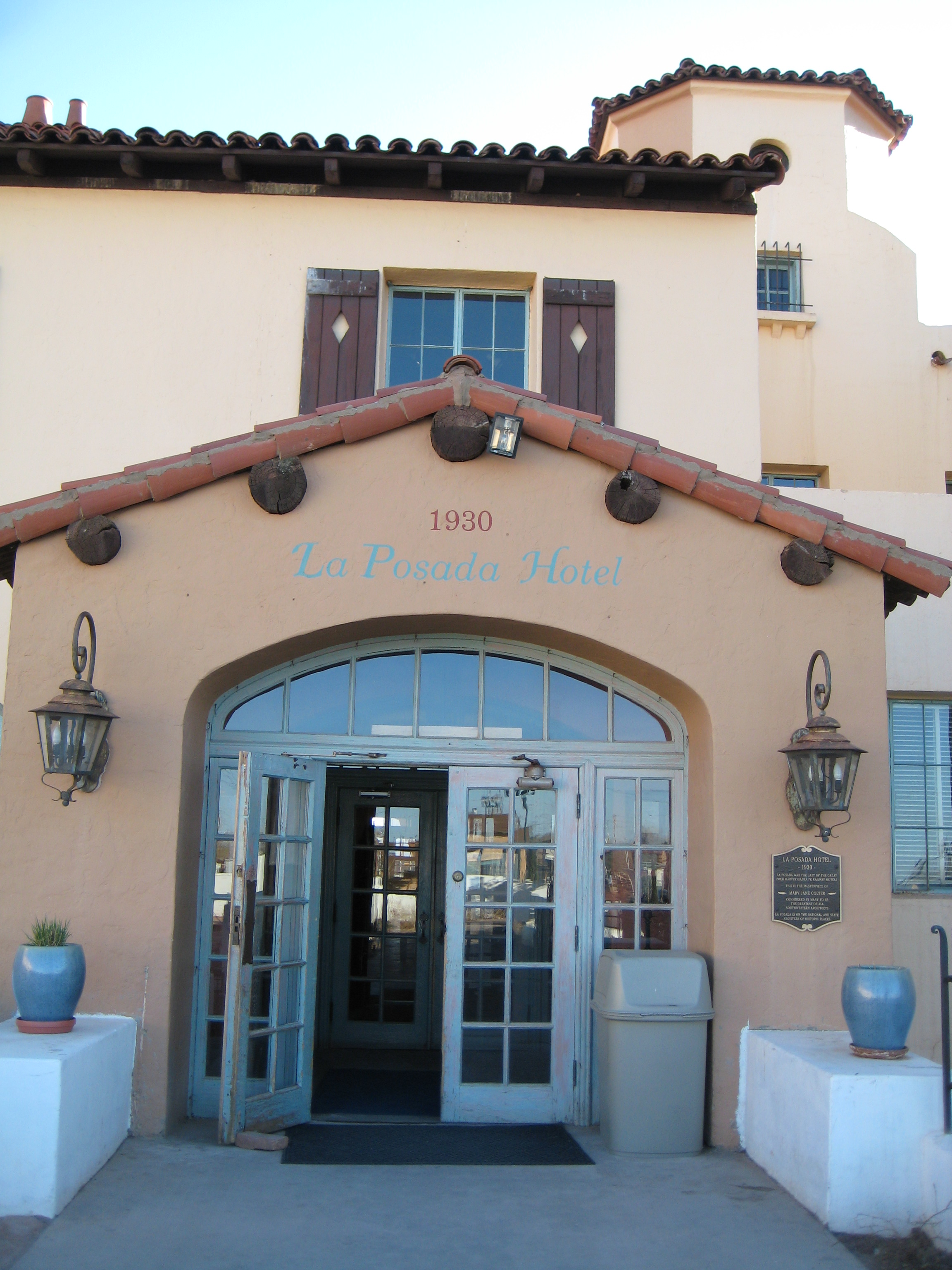
- La Posada Hotel

- Location within Arizona Location within the United States
- Location: 200 East Second Street; Winslow, Arizona; United States
- Coordinates: 35°1′18″N 110°41′41″W
- Area: 11 acres (4.5 ha)
- Built: 1930
- Architect: Colter, Mary E.J.; Harvey, Fred, Co.
- Architectural style: Mission Revival/Spanish Colonial Revival
- NRHP reference No.: 92000256
- Added to NRHP: March 31, 1992

The La Posada Historic District is a historic district in eastern Winslow, Arizona, United States, that is listed on the National Register of Historic Places (NRHP).

== Description ==
The district is located at 200 East Second Street and dates from 1930. It was listed as an 11-acre (4.5 ha) historic district on the NRHP March 31, 1992.

It includes the Winslow Santa Fe station as well as La Posada Hotel and Gardens, a Fred Harvey Company hotel possibly designed or decorated by Mary Jane Colter in 1929 and restored in 1997 by artist Tina Mion and her husband Allan Affeldt. The hotel also includes a museum for Mion's art, opened in 2011.

The buildings in the historic district are of the Mission Revival and Spanish Colonial Revival architecture styles, and are listed for architectural criteria. The listing includes three contributing buildings, one contributing site and one other contributing structure.

== See also ==
- National Register of Historic Places listings in Navajo County, Arizona
- Winslow (Amtrak station)
