= Winslow–Lindbergh Regional Airport =

Airport in Navajo County, Arizona

Winslow–Lindbergh Regional Airport Winslow Municipal Airport
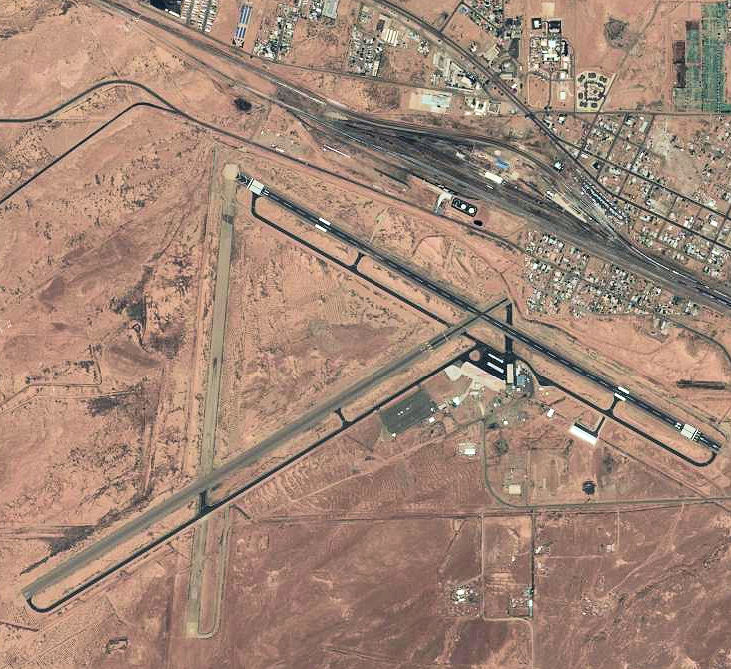
- USGS aerial photo, 1997
- IATA: INW; ICAO: KINW; FAA LID: INW; WMO: 72374

Summary
- Airport type: Public
- Owner: City of Winslow
- Serves: Winslow, Arizona
- Elevation AMSL: 4,941 ft / 1,506 m
- Coordinates: 35°01′19″N 110°43′21″W

Map

Runways
Direction	Length		Surface
Direction	ft	m	Surface
4/22	7,499	2,286	Asphalt
11/29	7,100	2,164	Asphalt

Statistics (2020)
- Aircraft operations: 24,210
- Based aircraft: 7
- Source: Federal Aviation Administration

Winslow–Lindbergh Regional Airport (IATA: INW, ICAO: KINW, FAA LID: INW) is 1 mile (0.87 nmi; 1.6 km) mile west of Winslow, in Navajo County, Arizona. The U.S. Forest Service has a firefighting air tanker base here. The airport was served by TWA and Frontier Airlines but now sees no airline service.

== History ==
The airport was built in 1929 by Transcontinental Air Transport (TAT). Aviator Charles Lindbergh, who served as head of TAT's Technical Committee, chose Winslow as one of twelve critical refueling stops on the nation's first transcontinental passenger line. For many years it was the only all-weather airport between Albuquerque, New Mexico, and Los Angeles, California. In 1930 TAT merged with Western Air Express and the new carrier became Trans Continental and Western Air, or TWA. Ford Trimotor aircraft were first used followed by the Douglas DC-2 in 1934 and the Douglas DC-3 in 1937. During World War II the airfield was used by the United States Army Air Forces Air Transport Command as a refueling and repair stop for military aircraft. The airport is dedicated to the memory of Walter "Melvin" Kislingbury, a Winslow resident who was killed in a WW II flight mission in Louisiana in 1943. In 1949 the YB-49 had to make an emergency landing at this airport. TWA's service to Winslow ended in 1953 when the airline retired its DC-3's and acquired much larger Lockheed Constellation aircraft which were capable of flying from Los Angeles to Albuquerque without refueling.

Arizona Airways also served the city in the late 1940s and merged to become Frontier Airlines (1950–1986) in 1950. Frontier served Winslow as one of many stops along a Denver to Phoenix route as well as an Albuquerque to Phoenix route using Douglas DC-3 and later upgrading to Convair 340 and Convair 580 aircraft. Frontier's service ended in 1974 and the airport was then served by several commuter airlines with flights to Phoenix and Albuquerque. These included Cochise Airlines from 1974 through 1982, Desert Airlines in 1979 and 1980, Desert Pacific Airlines in 1980 and 1981 (direct service to Los Angeles), Sun West Airlines from 1982 through 1985, and Golden Pacific Airlines from 1985 through 1987. Lindbergh Regional Airport has not seen airline service since 1987.

== Facilities ==
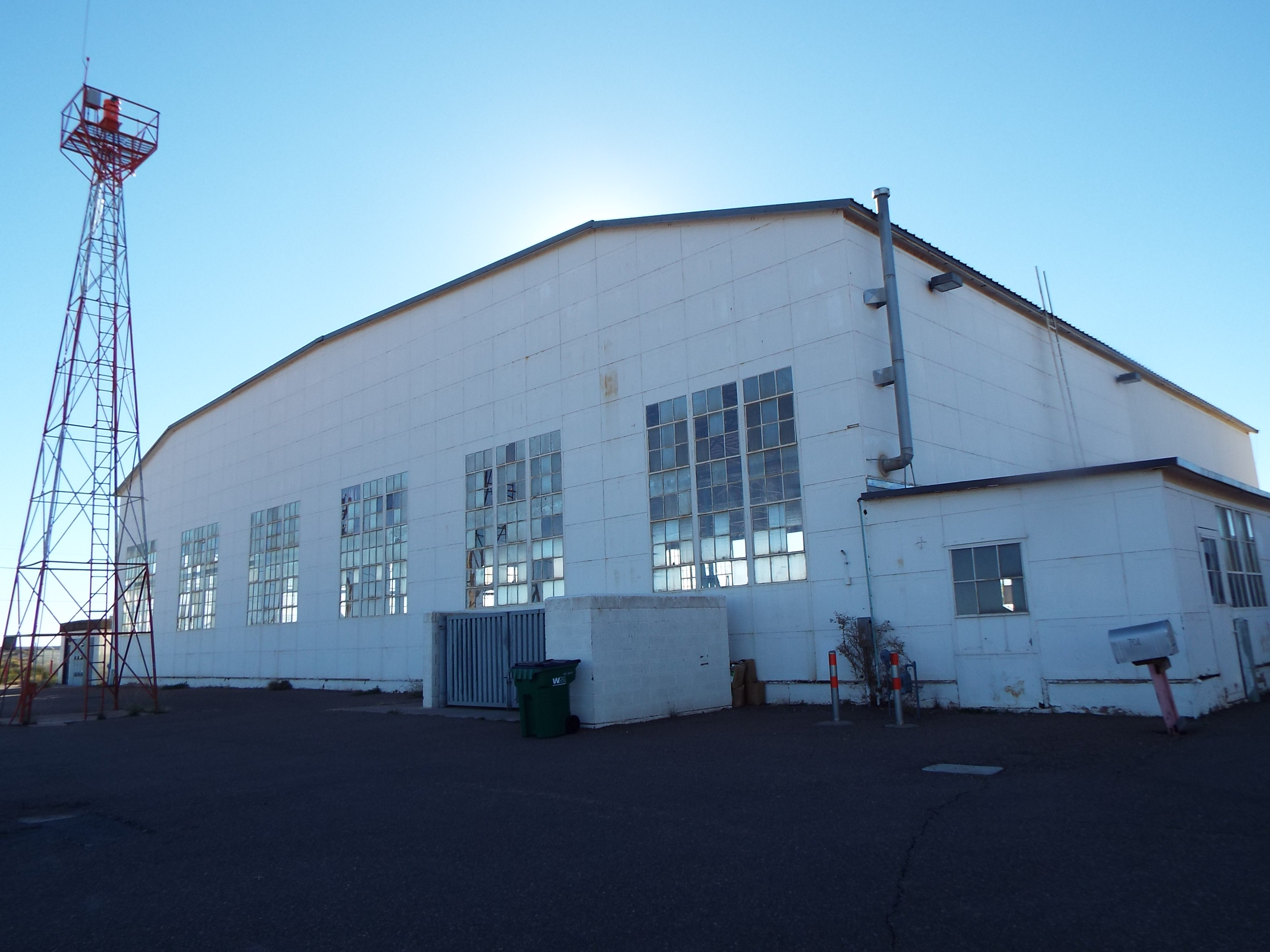
The historic Winslow–Lindbergh Regional Airport, built in 1929

The airport covers 900 acres (360 ha) at an elevation of 4,941 feet (1,506 m). It has two asphalt runways:

- 4/22 is 7,499 by 150 feet (2,286 x 46 m).
- 11/29 is 7,100 by 150 feet (2,164 x 46 m).

In the year ending December 31, 2020, the airport had 24,210 aircraft operations, an average of 66 per day: 98% general aviation and 2% military. Seven aircraft were then based at this airport: 5 single-engine, 1 multi-engine and 1 jet.

Winslow Airport is served by Wiseman Aviation as a FBO, and is regularly visited by Cooper Aerial, an aerial photography firm.

== See also ==
- List of airports in Arizona
