= Birdie Wilcox-Cano =

American politician

Mayor of Winslow, Arizona
- Incumbent
- Assumed office December 8, 2020

Personal details
- Born: Winslow, Arizona, U.S.
- Children: 4

Roberta "Birdie" Wilcox-Cano is an American politician and the first Native American to be elected mayor in the state of Arizona. She has served as the mayor of Winslow, Arizona, since her election in 2020.

Born and raised in Winslow, Wilcox-Cano is of Navajo and Pueblo heritage. She began working for the city of Winslow in 2013, starting as a secretary and rising to community services coordinator before her mayoral election. As mayor, her administration has focused on economic development, addressing housing and energy shortages, and securing over $100 million in funding for a levee project on the Colorado River.

== Early life and education ==
Wilcox-Cano was born and raised in Winslow, Arizona. She grew up in the 1970s and 1980s, a time she remembers as having an "energized, communal feel" with a bustling downtown before the town was bypassed by Interstate 40. Her father was a railroader of Navajo and Pueblo heritage, and her mother was a Mormon teacher of Scottish and Irish ancestry. Her Navajo heritage is from the Edgewater clan, and her Puebloan side is San Juan Pueblo Ohkay Owingeh, Winter People. Wilcox-Cano has described herself as having been shy as a child.

She graduated from Winslow High School in 1993. At that time, she felt there was "not much of a future" for her in Winslow, which was experiencing an economic downturn. She subsequently left and lived in Yuma, Arizona, for 12 years before returning to her hometown in 2005.

In May 2025, Wilcox-Cano was selected to participate in the 17th cohort of the Flinn-Brown Fellowship. She was scheduled to begin the Flinn-Brown Academy, a 12-session public policy institute, in August 2025.

== Career ==
Wilcox-Cano worked for the Arizona Department of Corrections in Yuma. After leaving corrections, she began working for the city of Winslow in the Recreation Department and "worked her way up" into city hall. Her city career began in 2013 as an entry-level secretary. She later became the city hall administrative assistant before being promoted to community services coordinator in 2017, where she served as the city's liaison for planning and organizing events. She has also been a volunteer and community organizer.

=== Mayor of Winslow ===
In 2020, Wilcox-Cano was elected mayor of Winslow, making history as the first Native American to hold the position in the city and the first Native American to be elected mayor in the state of Arizona. She was sworn into office on December 8, 2020. As of 2025, Wilcox-Cano was serving her third term, which is set to end in December 2026.

Wilcox-Cano stated that her election helped "break the mold," as she felt previous city leaders had not represented the "true demographics of Winslow" for decades. At the time of her election, she was one of only two Native American women to have ever served on the Winslow city council. In 2024, Wilcox-Cano joined the National League of Cities' Local Indigenous Leaders caucus, which works to support Indigenous leaders.

==== Mayoral initiatives ====
Wilcox-Cano's stated mission as mayor is to grow Winslow's economy and remove obstacles to development. She has said she was motivated to run for office after witnessing "missed opportunities" for business, grants, and development. She has focused on addressing housing and job shortages, in part by re-evaluating "antiquated" or restrictive city codes that she believed could drive developers away.

As of 2025, Wilcox-Cano considers her biggest success in office to be securing funding for an outdated levee on the Colorado River. The project, which had been on the city's agenda for 15 years, is estimated to cost over $100 million and will prevent a potential flood that could affect 80% of the town. The funding includes $65 million from the federal government and $35 million from Yavapai County. Work was scheduled to begin in mid-2025 for completion by 2029.

A primary focus of her third term is addressing the city's energy needs, which she identified as a barrier to attracting major employers. Her administration is working with Arizona Public Service (APS) to resolve this and is exploring a potential partnership with the Hopi Tribe on a solar farm or other energy sources. She has also pushed for regional cooperation, stating, "There is no reason that Winslow, Joseph City and Holbrook cannot work together."

A goal for Wilcox-Cano is creating opportunities to encourage young people and families to stay in or return to Winslow. She has pointed to local resources like Northland Pioneer College, which offers trade classes like welding to high school students, as a way for graduates to earn an associate degree alongside their diploma.

Her administration is working with Atlas Global Development on a 1,618-acre industrial park. Wilcox-Cano stated they are on "good terms" with the developer after the company agreed to exclude the historic Southside and Coopertown neighborhoods from its proposals, an issue on which she had strongly advocated for the residents. She also supports artist cooperatives as a solution to the high cost of commercial space in Winslow.

Wilcox-Cano has stated her vision for Winslow's cultural identity is rooted in its Hopi and Diné/Navajo art, recalling that in her youth, the town "was more like Santa Fe" with a vibrant trade in local crafts, pottery, and jewelry. She has noted that a significant challenge is overcoming the "stagnation and lowered expectations" in the community resulting from decades of economic hardship, stating, "One of the hardest things is trying to convince 10,000 people that they're worth good things again."

== Personal life ==
Wilcox-Cano is married to Ernesto "Ernest" Cano and has four children. Her husband was a lieutenant with the Winslow Police Department in 2020 and became the acting chief of the department in November 2024.

The position of mayor of Winslow pays approximately $400 a month and includes medical coverage. Wilcox-Cano supplements her income by working as a substitute teacher at local schools and as a bartender.

== See also ==
- List of Native American politicians
- Native American women in politics
