= Tina Mion =

American artist (born 1960)

Tina Mion (born August 26, 1960) is an American contemporary artist, working in oil paint and pastels. She lives in Winslow, Arizona, where she and her husband own La Posada, a local hotel in which much of her art is on display.

== Life ==
Mion was born in Washington, D.C., and grew up going to the museums there. She apprenticed with New Hampshire painter Sidney Willis, and attended art school but dropped out before finishing, instead traveling to Sri Lanka and India.

She met her husband, Allan Affeldt, in 1988 on a peace walk organized by Affeldt from Odessa to Kiev in the Soviet Union. In the late 1990s, they moved from the University of California, Irvine, where her husband was a graduate student, to Winslow, Arizona, in part because Mion found the open spaces of Homolovi State Park to be an inspiration in her work. They bought and restored La Posada, a dilapidated 1929 hotel in the La Posada Historic District of Winslow; in 2005 Affeldt became the mayor of Winslow. A museum of Mion's artworks opened within the hotel in April 2011.

== Art ==
Mion's 1996 "Virtual Election" project consists of a set of 52 portraits, of 42 U.S. presidents and several other famous people, together with a web site allowing visitors to vote among them. The series has been shown at several presidential libraries, and she later added another series of portraits of presidential wives.

A 1997 painting by Mion from the presidential wife series shows Jacqueline Kennedy Onassis holding a playing card (the king of hearts) cut into two by a bullet. It is now in the permanent collection of the Smithsonian's National Portrait Gallery, as is a 2007 pastel by Mion depicting astronaut Neil Armstrong. Several more of her works have been featured in temporary exhibits at the Smithsonian. A giclée print of the Onassis painting is also in the collection of the Nelson-Atkins Museum of Art.

Mion's painting process was described in the short documentary film Tina Mion – Behind the Studio Door (2011, directed by David Herzberg) which was shown in 2012 in the Sedona Film Festival and the Newport Beach Film Festival.
