= Standin' on the Corner Park =

Public park in Winslow, Arizona

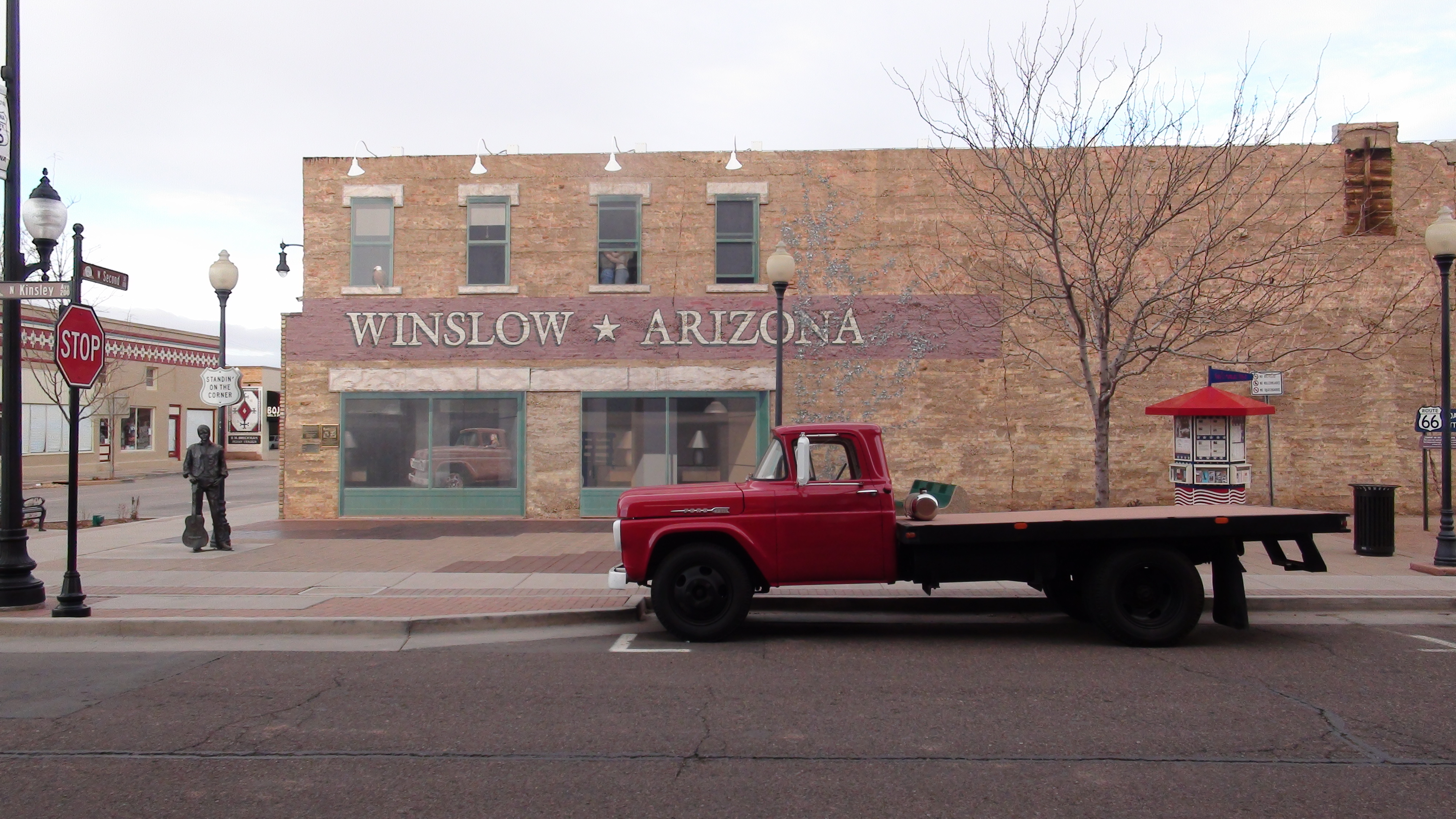
- Standin' on the Corner Park, a tribute to the Jackson Browne/Glenn Frey song "Take It Easy"
- Interactive map of Standin' on the Corner Park
- Type: Municipal
- Location: Winslow, Arizona
- Coordinates: 35°1′24.54″N 110°41′53.03″W
- Created: 1999
- Operator: Standin' On The Corner Foundation

Standin' on the Corner Park is a public park in Winslow, Arizona, opened in 1999, commemorating the song "Take It Easy" which was written by Jackson Browne and Glenn Frey and most famously recorded by Frey's band, the Eagles. The song includes the verse "Well, I'm a-standin' on a corner in Winslow, Arizona, and such a fine sight to see. It's a girl, my Lord, in a flatbed Ford slowin' down to take a look at me." The park contains a two-story trompe-l'œil mural by John Pugh, a Ford flatbed truck, and a bronze statue by Ron Adamson entitled "Easy" (which resembles Browne, but represents "the troubadour") who is standing on a corner with a guitar by his side. The park is surrounded by a wall of bricks, with windows to peer into; each brick has a donor's name on it, and a story by each of the donors describing their fondness for Winslow, Arizona.

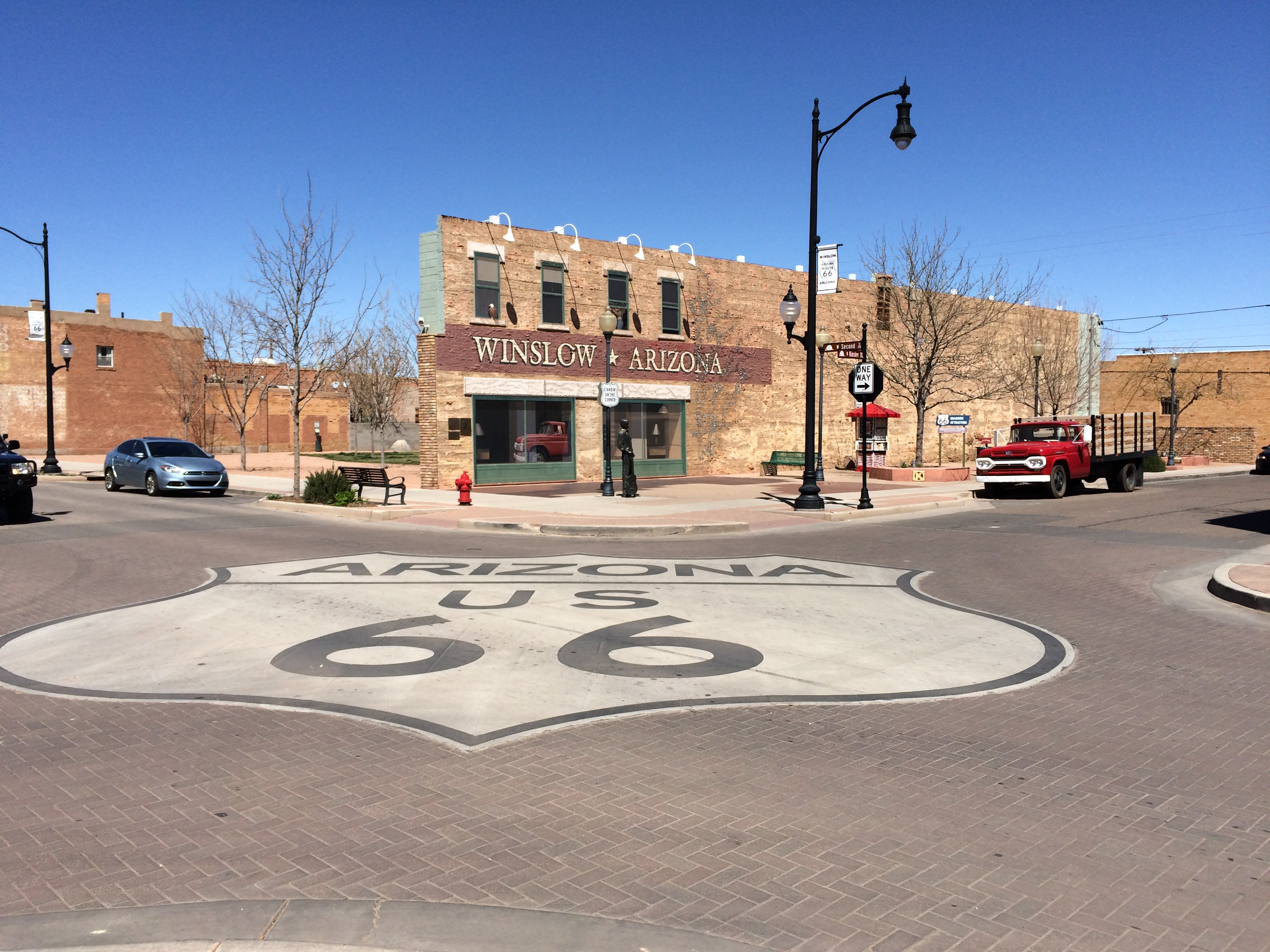
The Arizona US Route 66 marker at Standing on the Corner Park Winslow, Arizona

== History ==
Until the 1970s, Winslow was a thriving town in northern Arizona just off Route 66. When I-40 bypassed the community many local businesses disappeared, the tourism sector being among the hardest hit. While some local jobs remained (Winslow is the base of operation for nearly 1,000 railroad workers), the local downtown was badly hurt by the influx of national chains such as Walmart and McDonald's along the new interstate highway to the north of the town. Twenty years passed and Winslow was stuck in a commercial rut.

The Standin' on the Corner Foundation was formed to create a renaissance of Winslow. Determined to build on tourism, the foundation took advantage of the town being mentioned in the song "Take It Easy" made famous by the Eagles. From 1997 until 1999, the foundation sought out donors and planned design concepts. On September 10 and 11, 1999 the park was opened to the public.

On October 18, 2004, there was a fire at the Standin' on the Corner Park. While the face of the building and the actual corner survived, the rest of the building was burned down.

The 2006 release of animated film Cars brought renewed attention to the efforts to save local U.S. Route 66 main street businesses in towns long bypassed.

In September 2016, a statue was unveiled at the park in the likeness of Glenn Frey, who died earlier that year.
