= Winslow, Arizona =

- City
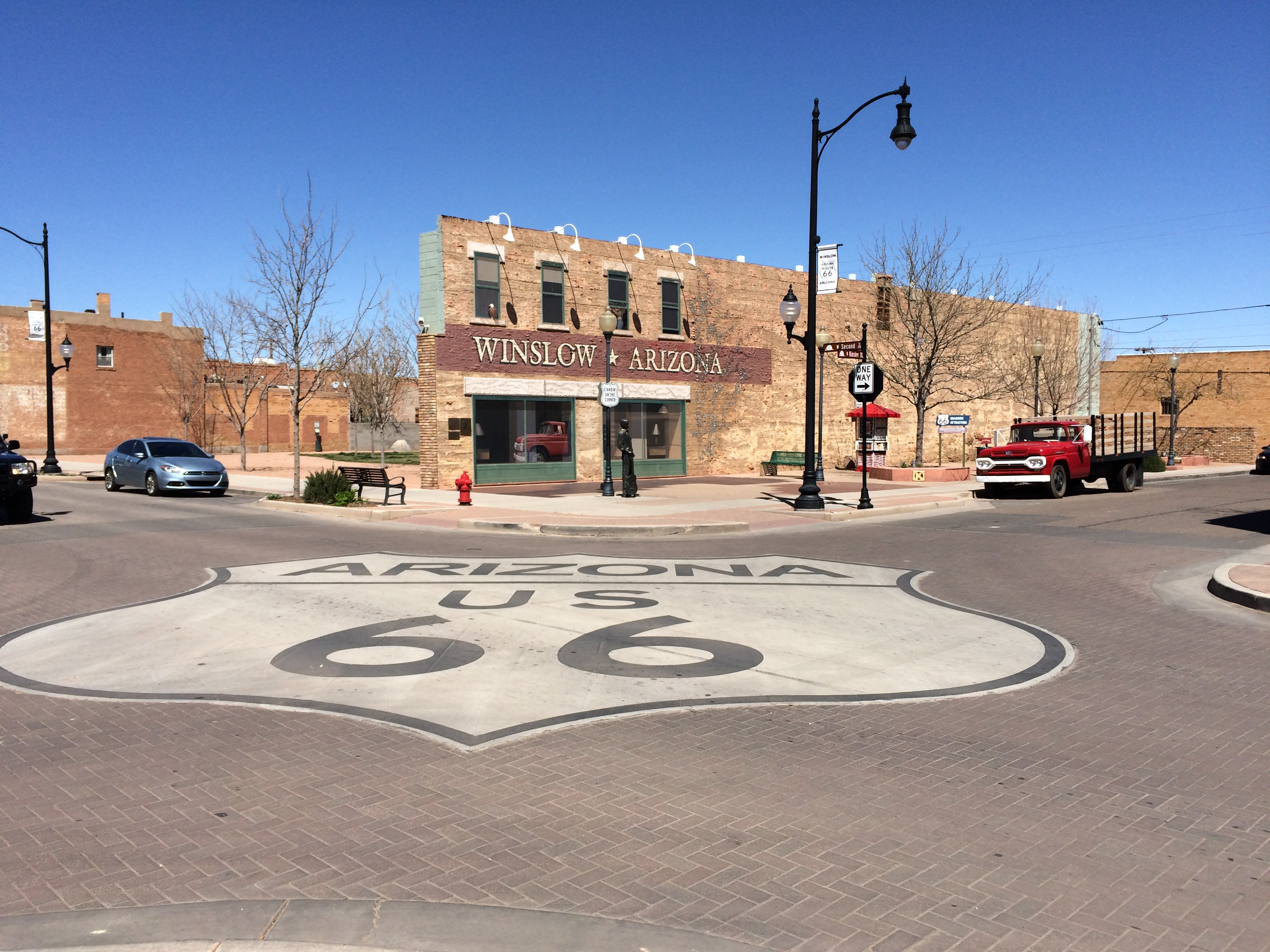
- Standin' on the Corner Park in downtown Winslow

- Flag

- Location of Winslow in Navajo County, Arizona.

- Location in the United States
- Coordinates: 35°01′28″N 110°43′10″W
- Country: United States
- State: Arizona
- County: Navajo
- Incorporated: 1900

Government
  - Mayor: Birdie Wilcox-Cano

Area
  - Total: 13.04 sq mi (33.78 km^{2})
  - Land: 12.99 sq mi (33.64 km^{2})
  - Water: 0.054 sq mi (0.14 km^{2})
- Elevation: 4,866 ft (1,483 m)

Population (2020)
  - Total: 9,005
  - Density: 690/sq mi (268/km^{2})
- Time zone: UTC−7 (MST)
- ZIP code: 86047
- Area code: 928
- FIPS code: 04-83930
- GNIS ID(s): 2412286

Winslow is a city in Navajo County, Arizona, United States. According to the 2020 census, the population of the city is 9,005. It is approximately 57 miles (92 km) southeast of Flagstaff, 240 miles (390 km) west of Albuquerque, New Mexico, and 329 miles (529 km) southeast of Las Vegas.

== History ==
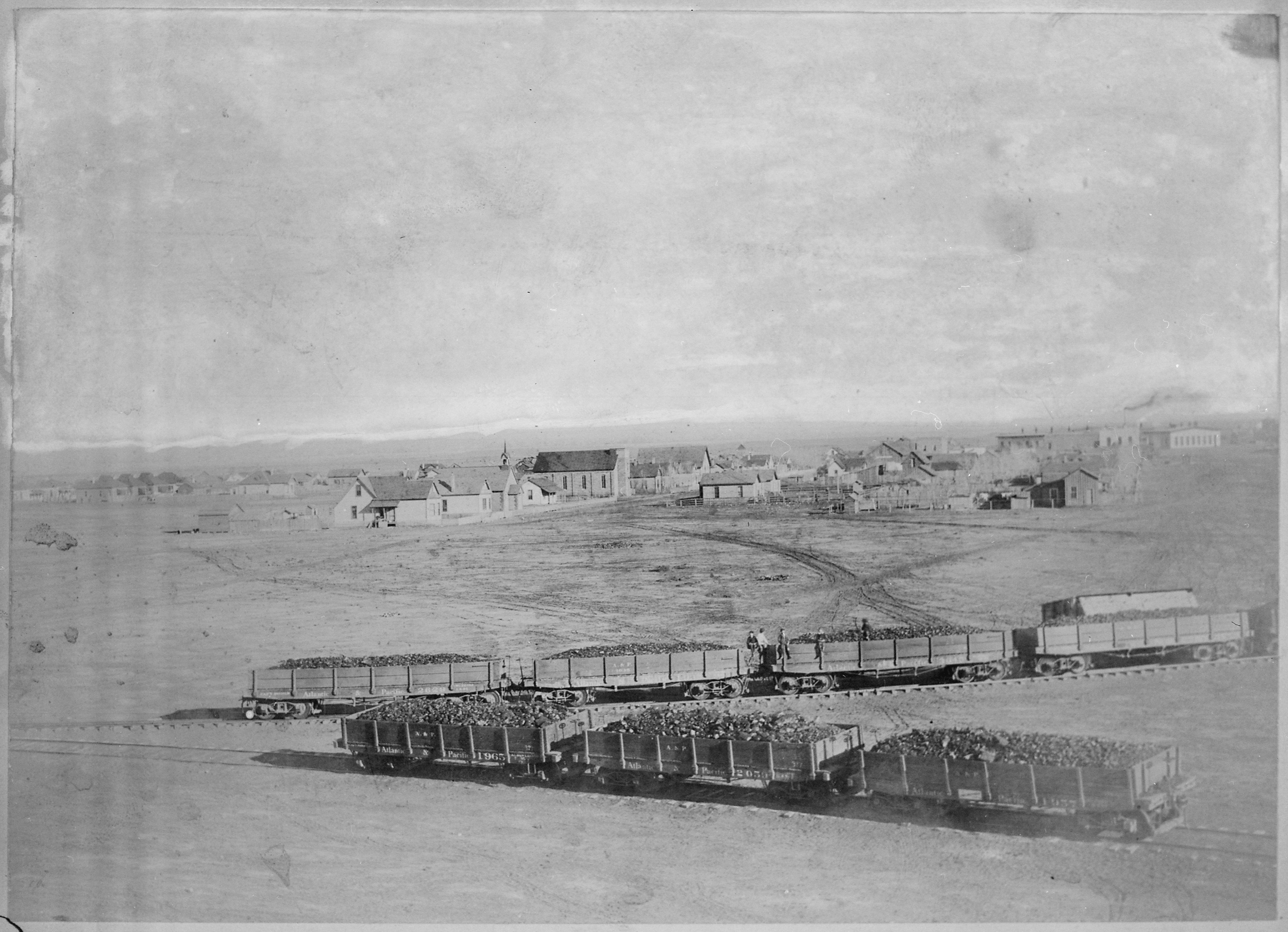
Winslow, 1890

Winslow was named for either Edward F. Winslow, president of St. Louis–San Francisco Railway, which owned half of the old Atlantic and Pacific Railroad, or Tom Winslow, a prospector who lived in the area.

The Harvey House, designed by Mary Colter, opened in 1930; It closed in 1957, and—early in the 1960s—the Santa Fe Railway gutted much of it, transforming it into its offices. The railroad abandoned the property in 1994 and announced plans to tear it down. However, it was bought and restored by Allan Affeldt, and now is known as the La Posada Hotel.

U.S. Route 66 originally passed through the city. A contract to build Interstate 40 as a bypass north of Winslow was awarded at the end of 1977.

== Geography ==
According to the United States Census Bureau, the city has an area of 12.3 square miles (32 km^{2}), all land. It is approximately 57 miles (92 km) southeast of Flagstaff, 320 miles (510 km) west of Albuquerque, New Mexico, and 329 miles (529 km) southeast of Las Vegas.

=== Climate ===
Winslow experiences a dry, temperate arid climate (Köppen BWk), with a wide diurnal temperature variation year-round, averaging 56 °F (13.3 °C). Winters are cool and dry, while summers are hot, and bringing the largest portion of the annual precipitation, which is 7.01 inches (178 mm); snowfall averages 8.1 inches (21 cm) per season (July 1 through June 30 of the subsequent year).

Climate data for Winslow Municipal Airport, Arizona (1991–2020 normals, (Note: Mean monthly maxima and minima (i.e. the expected highest and lowest temperature readings at any point during the year or given month) calculated based on data at said location from 1991 to 2020.) extremes 1898–present)
Month	Jan	Feb	Mar	Apr	May	Jun	Jul	Aug	Sep	Oct	Nov	Dec	Year
Record high °F (°C)	75 (24)	83 (28)	87 (31)	94 (34)	103 (39)	108 (42)	110 (43)	104 (40)	103 (39)	94 (34)	83 (28)	76 (24)	110 (43)
Mean maximum °F (°C)	63.9 (17.7)	70.3 (21.3)	77.9 (25.5)	85.2 (29.6)	92.9 (33.8)	101.3 (38.5)	102.5 (39.2)	99.0 (37.2)	94.4 (34.7)	86.6 (30.3)	75.0 (23.9)	65.3 (18.5)	103.6 (39.8)
Mean daily maximum °F (°C)	49.8 (9.9)	56.2 (13.4)	64.5 (18.1)	71.9 (22.2)	81.2 (27.3)	92.3 (33.5)	94.6 (34.8)	91.7 (33.2)	85.6 (29.8)	73.8 (23.2)	60.3 (15.7)	48.7 (9.3)	72.6 (22.6)
Daily mean °F (°C)	35.9 (2.2)	41.0 (5.0)	48.2 (9.0)	54.9 (12.7)	63.7 (17.6)	73.8 (23.2)	79.1 (26.2)	77.1 (25.1)	69.7 (20.9)	57.1 (13.9)	44.6 (7.0)	35.2 (1.8)	56.7 (13.7)
Mean daily minimum °F (°C)	22.0 (−5.6)	25.9 (−3.4)	31.8 (−0.1)	37.9 (3.3)	46.2 (7.9)	55.2 (12.9)	63.7 (17.6)	62.5 (16.9)	53.8 (12.1)	40.4 (4.7)	28.9 (−1.7)	21.7 (−5.7)	40.8 (4.9)
Mean minimum °F (°C)	7.5 (−13.6)	11.4 (−11.4)	17.5 (−8.1)	24.1 (−4.4)	32.7 (0.4)	42.7 (5.9)	53.9 (12.2)	54.1 (12.3)	39.8 (4.3)	24.6 (−4.1)	12.7 (−10.7)	7.1 (−13.8)	4.3 (−15.4)
Record low °F (°C)	−18 (−28)	−9 (−23)	−2 (−19)	14 (−10)	23 (−5)	29 (−2)	42 (6)	41 (5)	29 (−2)	7 (−14)	−9 (−23)	−19 (−28)	−19 (−28)
Average precipitation inches (mm)	0.51 (13)	0.42 (11)	0.49 (12)	0.25 (6.4)	0.30 (7.6)	0.14 (3.6)	0.89 (23)	1.16 (29)	0.87 (22)	0.51 (13)	0.48 (12)	0.50 (13)	6.52 (166)
Average snowfall inches (cm)	1.9 (4.8)	1.4 (3.6)	1.4 (3.6)	0.1 (0.25)	0.0 (0.0)	0.0 (0.0)	0.0 (0.0)	0.0 (0.0)	0.0 (0.0)	0.0 (0.0)	0.7 (1.8)	2.6 (6.6)	8.1 (21)
Average precipitation days (≥ 0.01 inch)	4.3	4.2	4.0	2.7	2.7	1.5	6.3	8.1	4.8	3.4	3.2	4.3	49.5
Average snowy days (≥ 0.1 inch)	1.9	1.2	1.1	0.2	0.0	0.0	0.0	0.0	0.0	0.0	0.7	1.9	7.0
Source 1: NOAA (snow/snow days 1981–2010)
Source 2: National Weather Service

== Demographics ==
Historical population
Census	Pop.	Note	%±
1890	363		—
1900	1,305		259.5%
1910	2,381		82.5%
1920	3,730		56.7%
1930	3,917		5.0%
1940	4,577		16.8%
1950	6,518		42.4%
1960	8,862		36.0%
1970	8,066		−9.0%
1980	7,921		−1.8%
1990	8,190		3.4%
2000	9,520		16.2%
2010	9,655		1.4%
2020	9,005		−6.7%
U.S. Decennial Census

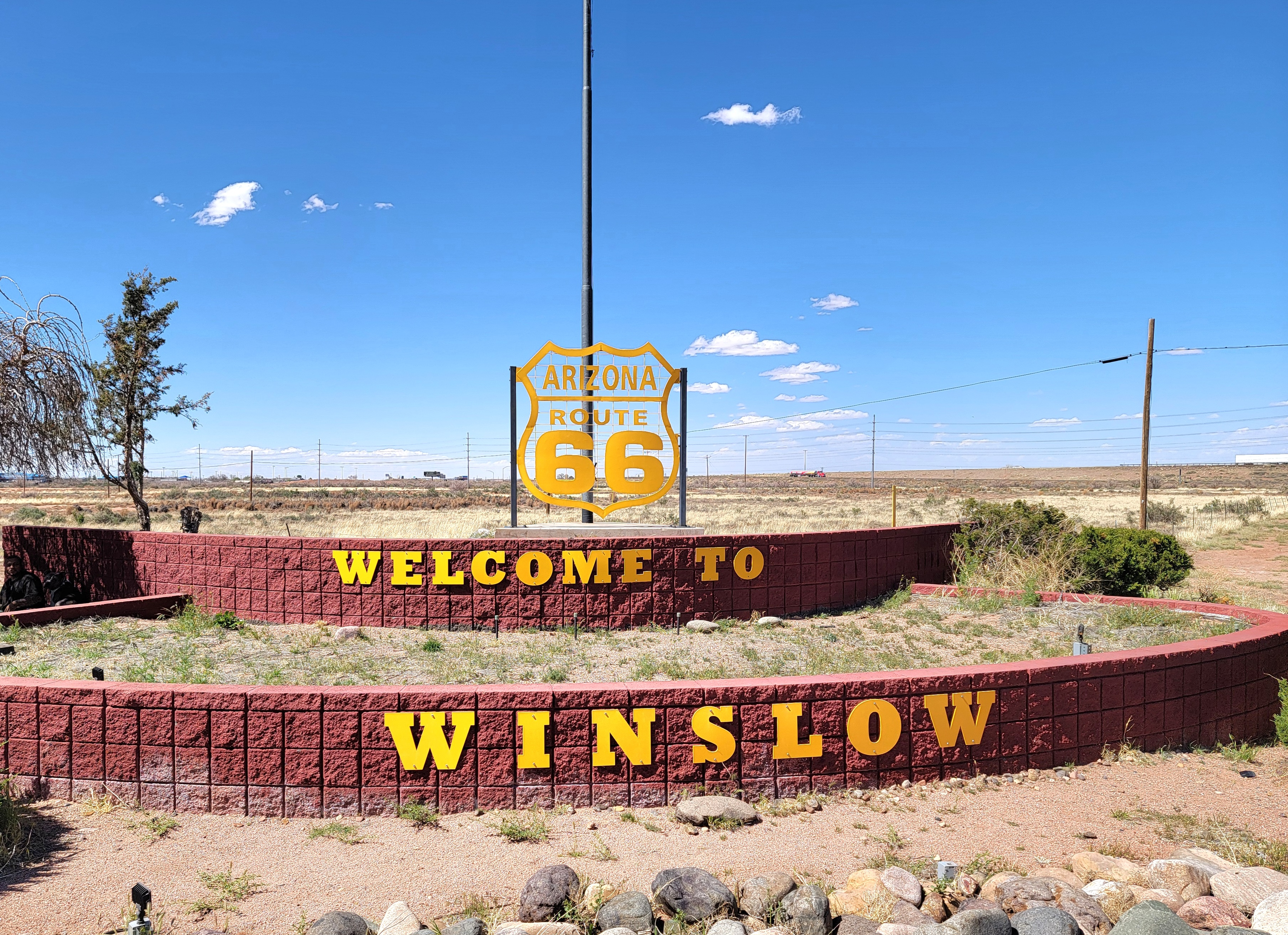
Welcome to Winslow sign in 2024

=== 2020 census ===
As of the 2020 census, Winslow had a population of 9,005. The median age was 34.3 years. 24.4% of residents were under the age of 18 and 14.3% of residents were 65 years of age or older. For every 100 females there were 116.5 males, and for every 100 females age 18 and over there were 120.0 males age 18 and over.

82.5% of residents lived in urban areas, while 17.5% lived in rural areas.

There were 2,890 households in Winslow, of which 38.1% had children under the age of 18 living in them. Of all households, 37.0% were married-couple households, 19.7% were households with a male householder and no spouse or partner present, and 33.0% were households with a female householder and no spouse or partner present. About 28.3% of all households were made up of individuals and 12.2% had someone living alone who was 65 years of age or older.

There were 3,371 housing units, of which 14.3% were vacant. The homeowner vacancy rate was 2.3% and the rental vacancy rate was 8.2%.

Racial composition as of the 2020 census
Race	Number	Percent
White	3,740	41.5%
Black or African American	390	4.3%
American Indian and Alaska Native	3,000	33.3%
Asian	66	0.7%
Native Hawaiian and Other Pacific Islander	11	0.1%
Some other race	797	8.9%
Two or more races	1,001	11.1%
Hispanic or Latino (of any race)	2,914	32.4%

=== 2000 census ===
As of the 2000 census, there were 9,520 people, 2,754 households, and 1,991 families residing in the city. The population density was 773 inhabitants per square mile (298/km^{2}). There were 3,198 housing units at an average density of 260 per square mile (100/km^{2}). The city's racial makeup was 40.8% White, 28.8% Hispanic or Latino of any race, 23.5% Native American, 13.5% from other races, 5.2% Black or African American, 1.0% Asian, 0.1% Pacific Islander and 4.2% from two or more races.

There were 2,754 households, of which 40.3% had children under the age of 18 living with them, 50.2% were married couples living together, 16.0% had a female householder with no husband present, and 27.7% were non-families. 23.7% of all households were made up of individuals, and 10.1% had someone living alone who was 65 years of age or older. The average household size was 2.86 and the average family size was 3.40.

In the city, the population was spread out, with 29.8% under the age of 18, 11.0% from 18 to 24, 31.1% from 25 to 44, 18.1% from 45 to 64, and 10.0% who were 65 years of age or older. The median age was 31 years. For every 100 females, there were 122.3 males. For every 100 females age 18 and over, there were 134.6 males.

The city's median household income was $29,741, and the median family income was $35,825. Males had a median income of $28,365 versus $20,698 for females. The city's per capita income was $12,340. About 17.5% of families and 20.9% of the population were below the poverty line, including 26.9% of those under age 18 and 16.3% of those age 65 or over.

== Arts and culture ==
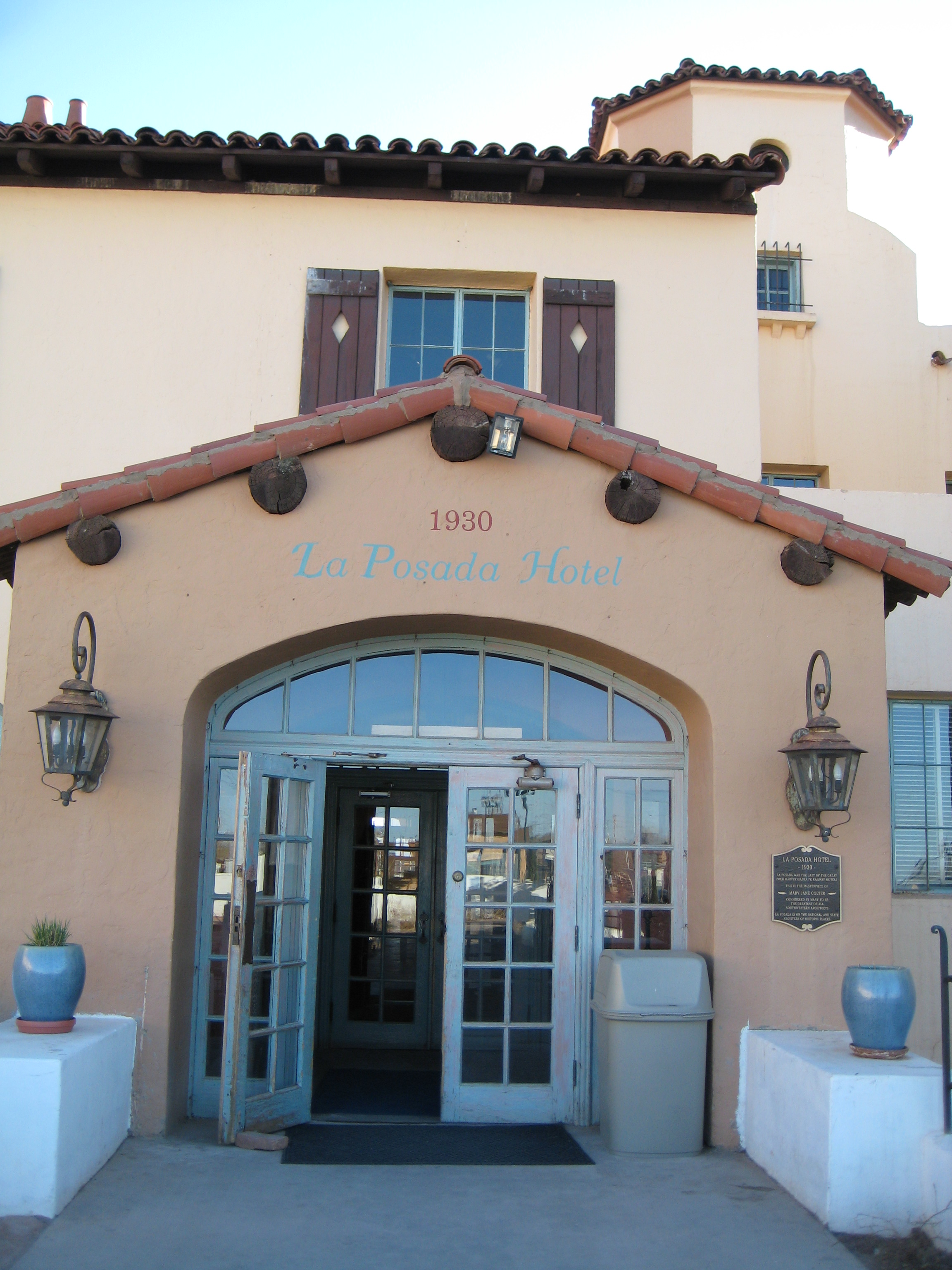
La Posada Hotel, Winslow

Standin' on the Corner Park is a downtown park featuring murals depicting the "Girl my Lord in a flatbed Ford". Winslow also has an annual Standin' On The Corner street festival, traditionally held the last week of September.

The 9-11 Remembrance Gardens honors those killed during the September 11 attacks. The memorial was constructed using two beams recovered from the wreckage of the World Trade Center towers.

== Education ==
Winslow is served by the Winslow Unified School District.

The city has three public elementary schools: Bonnie Brennan Elementary School, Jefferson Elementary School, and Washington Elementary School. Winslow Junior High School and Winslow High School serve the city. Winslow also hosts the Little Colorado Campus of Northland Pioneer College.

== Media ==
Winslow was formerly the home of radio station KINO on 1230 AM. The station closed down permanently on February 28, 2026.

== Infrastructure ==
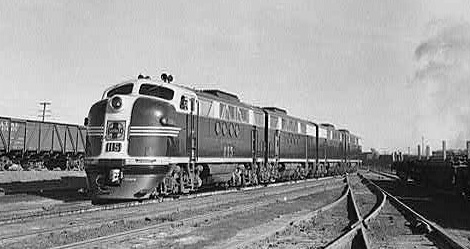
Diesel freight locomotive which has just come out of the Santa Fe roundhouse at Winslow, 1943. Photo by Jack Delano.

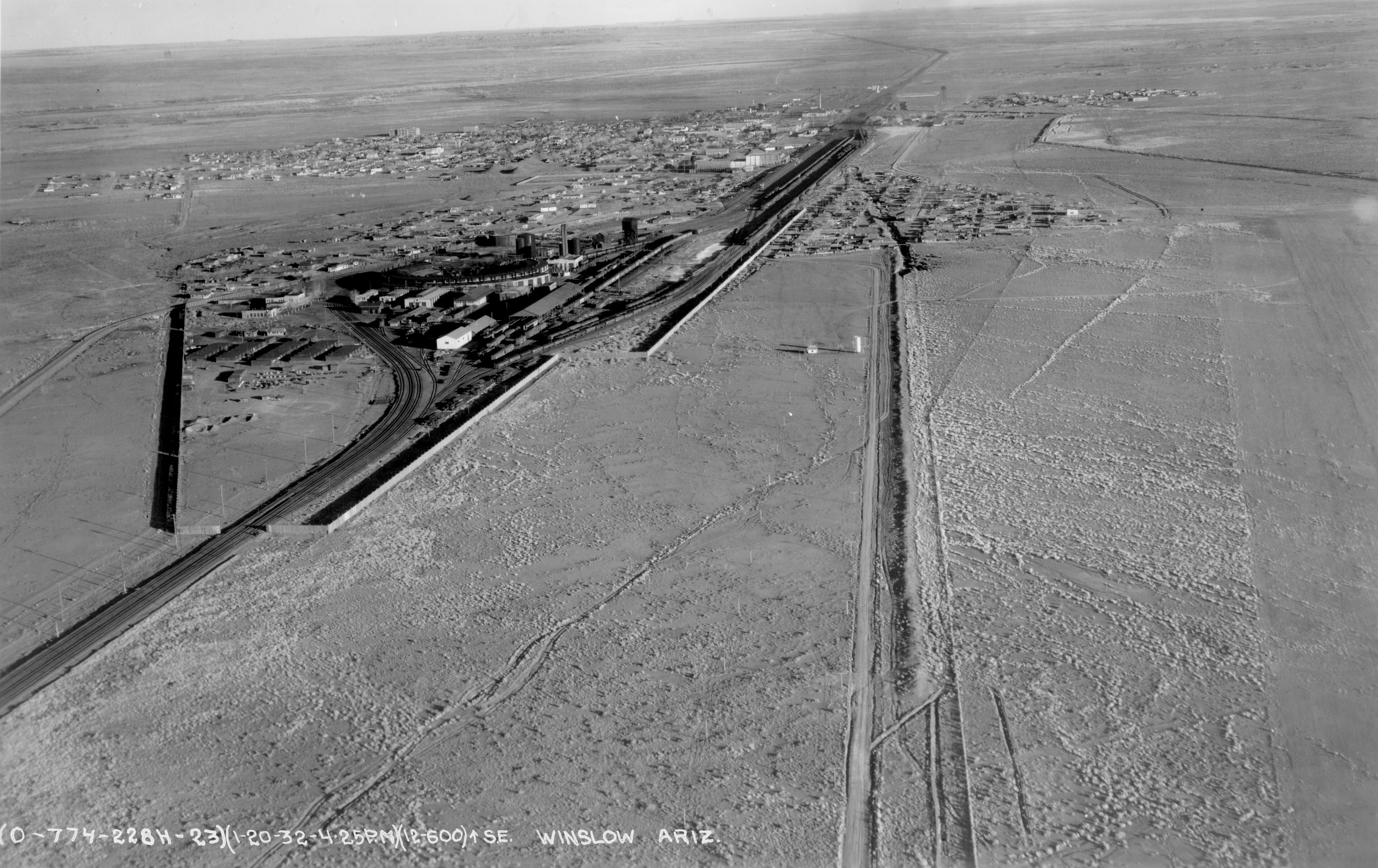
Railroad yards, 1932

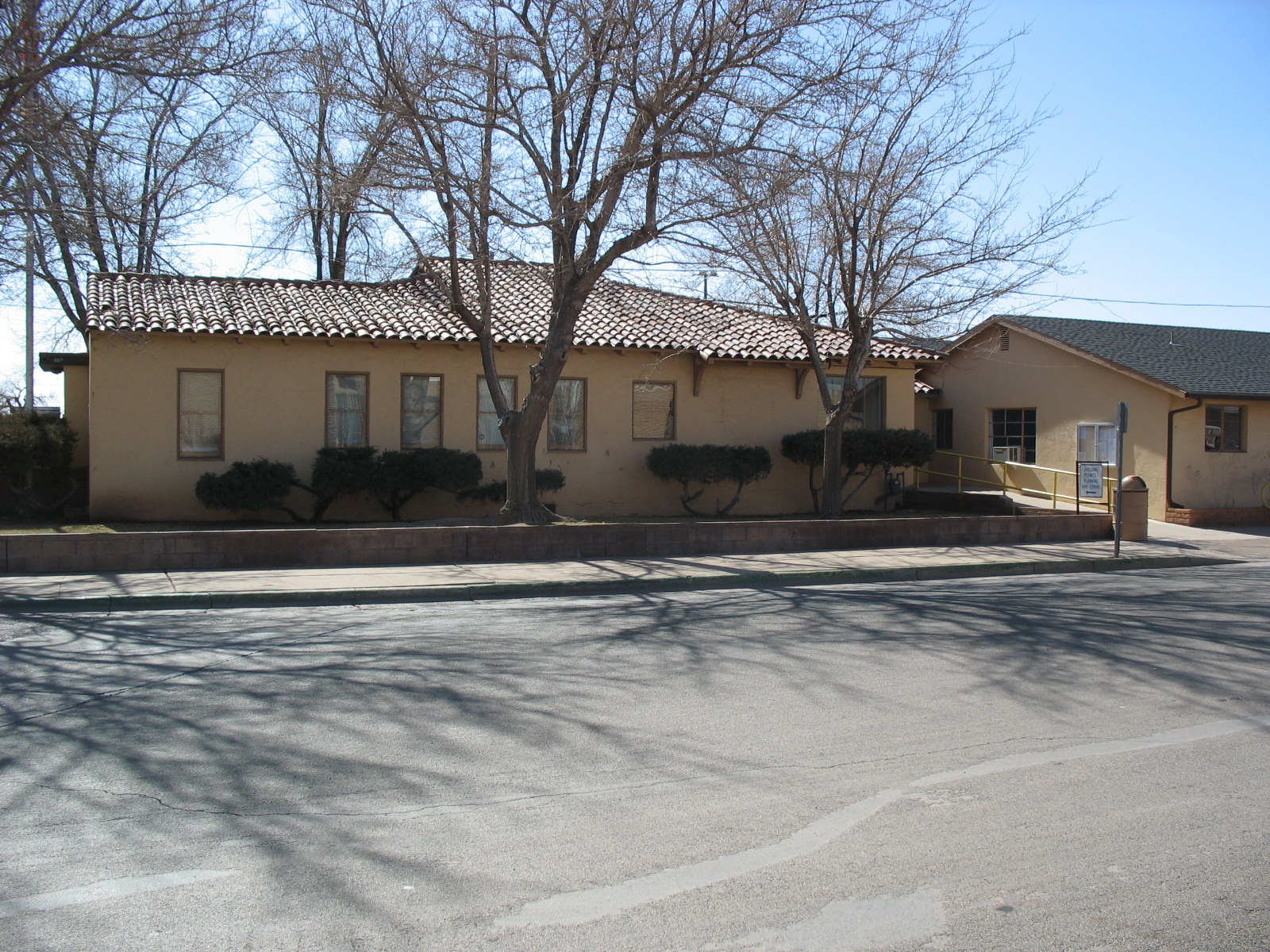
City hall

=== Transportation ===
Winslow is served by Winslow-Lindbergh Regional Airport, originally constructed by Transcontinental Air Transport, and designed by Charles Lindbergh.

Winslow Amtrak Station has twice-daily service by the Southwest Chief. The city is on BNSF's Southern Transcon route that runs between Los Angeles and Chicago.

Hopi Senom Transit provides bus service from Winslow to the Hopi Reservation.

Interstate 40 runs through Winslow; the Business route is the historic U.S. Route 66.

== Notable people ==
- Erika Alexander, actress
- Brad Carson, former U.S. Under Secretary of the Army and congressman
- William A. Conant (1816–1909), merchant, politician, and railroad agent. Worked as a railroad agent in Winslow
- Bill Engvall, comedian (not born there; resided there in the early 70s)
- Deb Haaland, First Native American woman elected to congress. 54th United States Secretary of the Interior. Governor-elect of New Mexico
- Michael Daly Hawkins, U.S. Attorney for Arizona; U.S. Circuit Judge 9th Circuit
- Nick Hysong, gold medalist in pole vault at the 2000 Summer Olympic Games
- Richard Kleindienst, United States Attorney General under Richard Nixon
- Vernon Lattin (born 1938), president of Brooklyn College
- Paul M. Lally Producer/Director/Writer "Mister Rogers' Neighborhood" (not born there; resided late 50s)
- Tina Mion, artist
- Tommy Singer, a Navajo silversmith who specialized in chip-inlay jewelry
- Jay R. Vargas, Medal of Honor recipient during the Vietnam War

== In popular culture ==
Winslow was mentioned in the 1972 Eagles song "Take It Easy".

== See also ==
- List of historic properties in Winslow, Arizona
- Homolovi Ruins State Park
