= List of historic properties in Kingman, Arizona =

- City
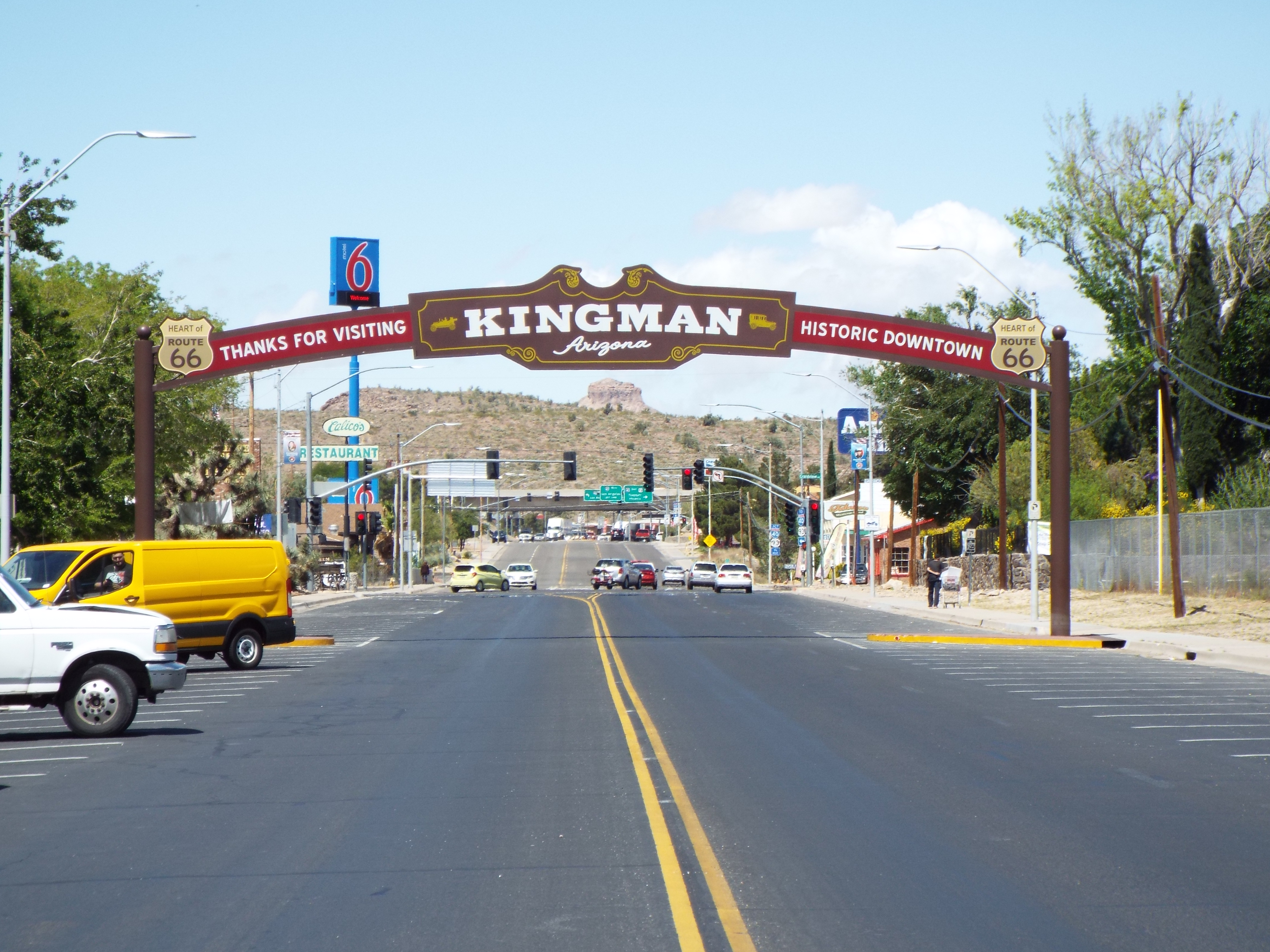
- Kingman Historic Commercial District

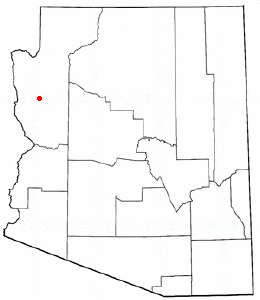
- Location of Kingman in Mohave County, Arizona.
- Coordinates: 35°12′30″N 114°1′33″W

This is a list that includes a photographic gallery of some remaining historical buildings, houses, structures and monuments in Kingman, Arizona, some of which are listed in the National Register of Historic Places (NRHP). Also, included are images of the historic Steam Engine #3759, which was built in 1927 for the Santa Fe Railroad.

== Brief history ==
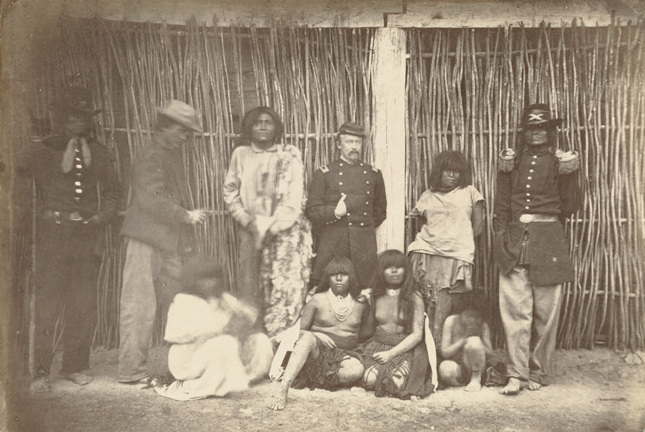
Fort Mohave close to Kingman

The first people to inhabit the current city of Kingman and its surrounding area were the Anasazi known as the “Ancient Ones,” and their Native American descendants, principally the Hualapai, Havasupai and Mohave tribes.

The first documented exploration of the area by Europeans was that made by the Spaniards led by Marcos de Niza. In 1539, he and his men arrived in the Kingman area in search of gold. The following year Francisco Vásquez de Coronado explored the area as well. Arizona was part of the state of Sonora, Mexico in 1822, however, the settled population by the Mexicans was small. During the California gold rush of 1849, people from the east coast of the United States and Anglo's from Europe began to travel into the area to explore and search for gold. Many of these travelers established homesteads and settled down in the area.

Between 1830 and 1860, the United States nearly doubled the amount of territory under its control. The United States fought against Mexico in what is known as the Mexican–American War. The war ended officially when the 1848 Treaty of Guadalupe Hidalgo was signed. It specified its major consequence, the Mexican Cession of the northern territories of Alta California and Santa Fe de Nuevo México to the United States.

The relations between the new settlers and the Mohaves was a friendly one at first. The Mohaves sold the wild game and other supplies to the travelers. They also acted as guides and messengers between wagon trains. The settlers, however still feared the possibility of an attack by the local natives.

=== Beale's Wagon Road ===
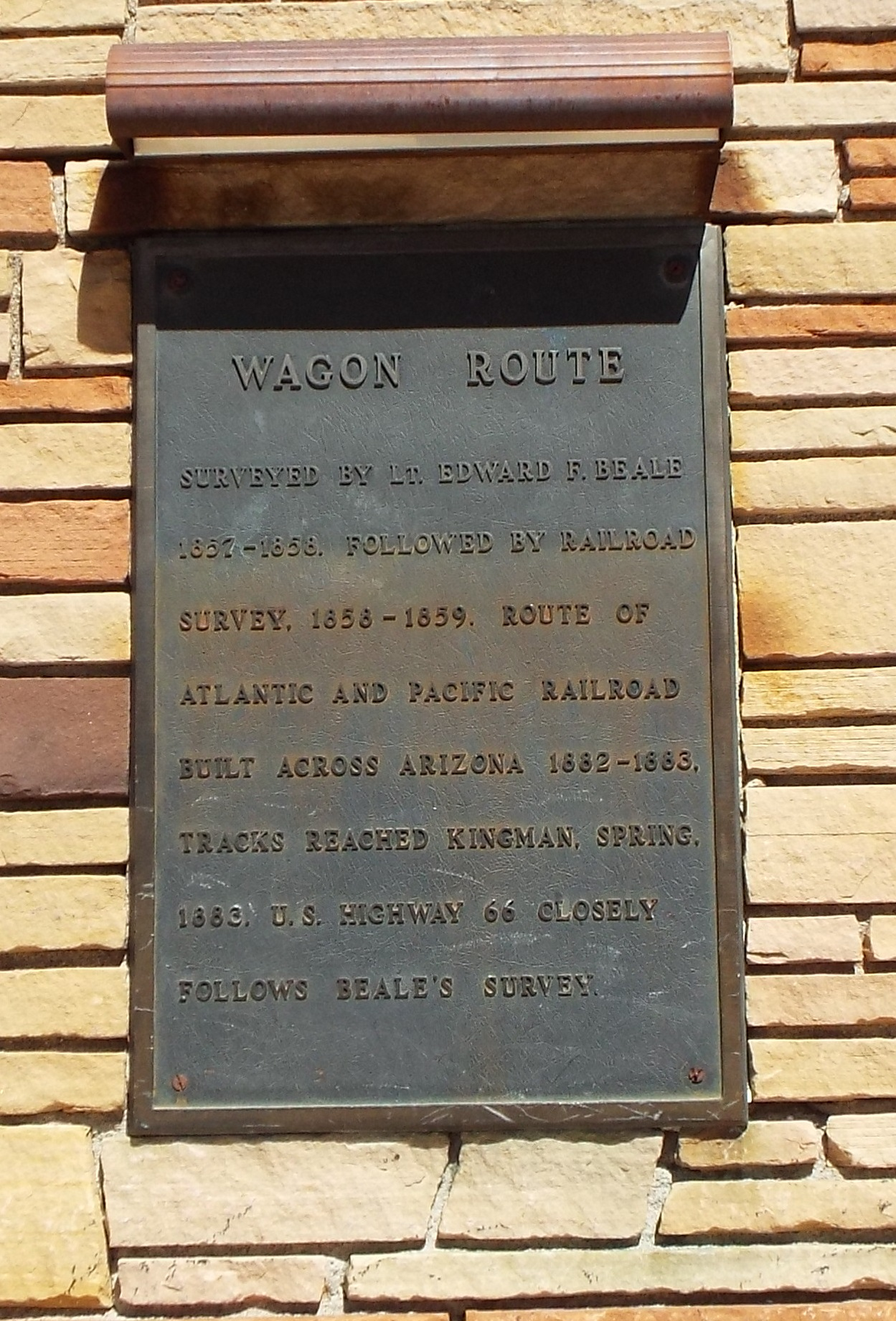
Beale Wagon Road Monument marker

In 1857, President James Buchanan appointed Edward Fitzgerald Beale to survey and build a 1,000-mile wagon road from Fort Defiance, Arizona to the Colorado River, on the border between Arizona and California along the 35th parallel. The wagon trail began at Fort Smith, Arkansas and continued through the New Mexico Territory to Fort Defiance. He then continued west over what is now northern Arizona to Camp Beale Springs near the modern City of Kingman. Many settlers used the wagon trail to move to the West. There is a marker in Kingman which indicates the area of the wagon trail which became part of U.S. Route 66 and the route for the Transcontinental railroad.

=== Atlantic & Pacific Railroad ===
Lewis Kingman, a civil engineer, who surveyed and built several thousands of miles of railroad lines. Kingman worked for the Atlantic & Pacific Railroad. In January 1880, Kingman's assignment was to survey and establish a railroad line from Flagstaff, Arizona to the Colorado River via Topock, Arizona. Kingman was in charge of the railroad contract work from Winslow to Beale Springs. In December 1881, Kingman was appointed chief engineer with a full charge of the railroad construction. Much of the length of the line which he established was parallel to Beale's Wagon Trail. The track reached the site of what is now the City of Kingman under his supervision. He chose the area as a station to house railroad construction materials.

=== Kingman City ===
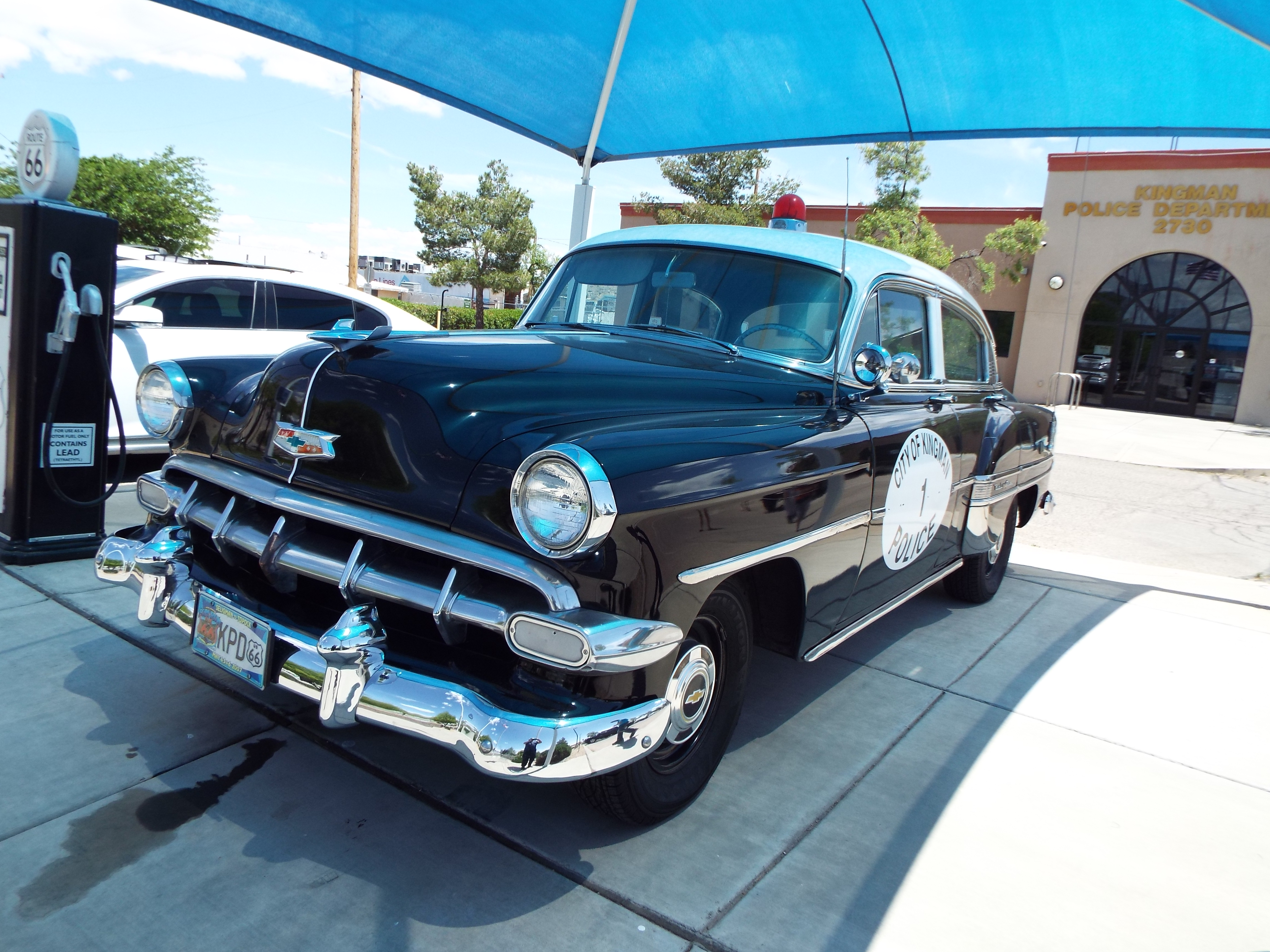
Historic Kingman 1954 Chevrolet Bel Air police car#1 a.k.a. "Jingles"

The Kingman townsite, named for Lewis Kingman, was designated in 1882. The original Kingman townsite was within the boundaries of what are now First and Sixth, Pine and Golconda streets. Johanna Wilkinson and her sister Francis came to the Kingman territory in the early 1880s. Her brother Tobi, who was working for the railroad, told her that the railroad workers had little food, only what they could get from the land which mostly consisted of rabbits. Tobi urged Johanna to come and cook for the railroad workers because he told she would make "good money." Johanna and Francis hired a teamster to haul their supplies and made the 300 plus mile trip. Once there, they set up a tent directly across from the train station Lewis Kingman had built, and cooking on an iron cast stove, fed the workers who sat on boxes and ate on boards for tables. Business thrived and Johanna and Francis added a wood floor to their restaurant. Learning that the workers were sleeping in the box cars or on the ground, they set up additional tents where they rented cots for the workers to sleep on. As Kingman developed into a mining town, Johanna married Harvey Hubbs and together they built Kingman's first hotel, the Hubbs House. The hotel caught fire nine times thanks to the miners smoking opium and tobacco and in bed. Because water had to be brought in from Peach Springs, there was no water to fight the fires. They built another Hubbs House, the first two-story building in Kingman, and then later the in partnership with Beale, the Beale Hotel which still stands. Harvey and Johanna's home was restored by the city of Kingman and is now on the National Register of Historic Places. Harvey would serve as county sheriff, county treasurer, and owned mines. He introduced Kingman to its first water system. Later, there was Mrs. Smith's lodging house and Mrs. Smith's restaurant located next to Ryan's Saloon. Kingman, which was a railroad town, prospered while many of the towns in Arizona, which were established as mining towns, went into decline after the mines were depleted.

In 1887, votes were taken to determine where the Mohave County seat was to be established and Kingman won. The county seat moved to Kingman and the courthouse offices were located in a two-story frame building, constructed by Orvin Peasley and W.H. Taggart. Kingman was officially incorporated in 1952

Among the early constructed historical properties in Kingman is the Little Red Schoolhouse which was built in 1896. Actor Andy Devine was an alumnus of the school. Also the Saint John's Methodist Episcopal Church which was built in 1917 and styled like an ancient Greek Temple. On March 29, 1939, Clark Gable and Carole Lombard were married there.

Some of the structures in Kingman are listed in the National Register of Historic Places. There are other structures, which according to the "Route 66 in Arizona Survey Report" are eligible to be listed in National Register of Historic Places. The fact that a property is listed in the National Register of Historic Places or that it may be eligible to be listed as such, does not mean that the property is safe from being demolished by its owner. According to Jim McPherson, Arizona Preservation Foundation Board President:

"It is crucial that residents, private interests, and government officials act now to save these elements of our cultural heritage before it is too late."

=== Route 66 ===
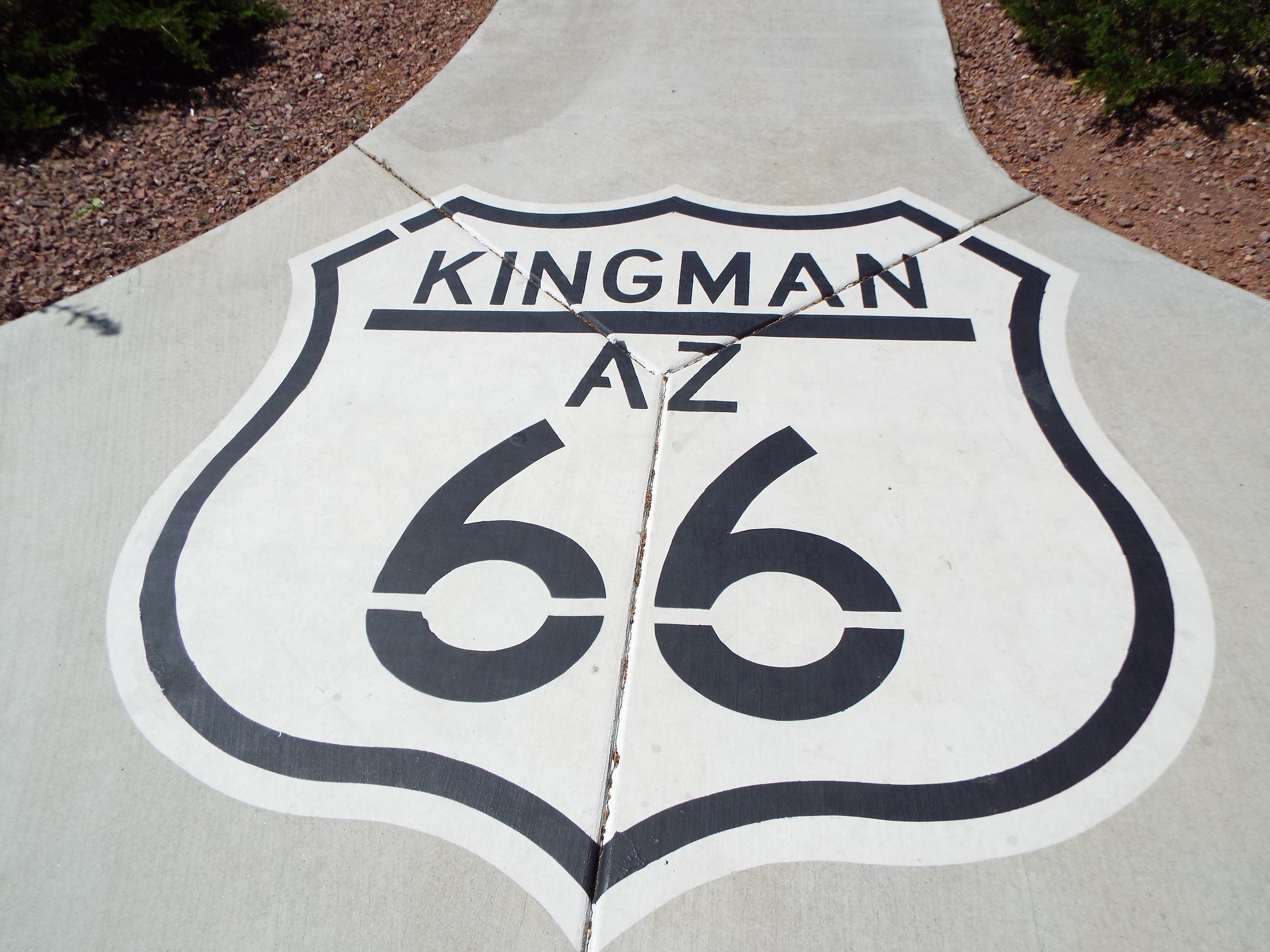
Historic Route 66

Route 66, also known as "The Mother Road", received official designation in 1926, after the government enacted a plan for the national highway which would link Chicago with Los Angeles. During its heyday, Route 66 connected the main streets of rural and urban communities. The route represented an opportunity for hundreds of thousands of people who packed up their belongings with the intention of escaping from the ruining effects of the Dust Bowl in the 1930s. Route 66 passed through a section of Kingman in what once was known as "Front St." and is now known as Andy Divine Ave. It played an important role in the history of Kingman and had a positive impact on the businesses on its path. Though historical, Route 66 lost its official United States Highway designation in 1985.

The Historic Powerhouse Building in Kingman, which supplied power to Kingman and area mines until Hoover Dam began producing power in the late 1930s, is now home to the Arizona Route 66 Museum.

== Mohave County Historical Society ==
According to the Mohave County Historical Society, which is located at 400 West Beale Street, its mission is the following:

Purpose:
…to increase and diffuse the knowledge and appreciation of the history of Mohave County, Arizona, and its early settlers and inhabitants; to maintain a museum in the City of Kingman, Arizona; to collect and preserve objects of historical and scientific interest; to protect historical and prehistoric sites, works of art and scenic places from needless destruction; and to provide facilities for research and publication. (From Articles of Incorporation, October 13, 1960)
Mission Statement:
Through the operation of the museum and archival facilities, to collect, preserve and protect Mohave County’s cultural and historic heritage, including historic and prehistoric sites, for public enjoyment, education and professional research. (Adopted January 15, 2004)

== Historic properties ==
=== AT&SF Locomotive #3759 ===
- AT&SF Locomotive #3759 – built in 1927 for the Atchison, Topeka and Santa Fe Railway. It is a standard gauge 4-8-4, Northern type, steam railway locomotive. It is on display in Locomotive Park, located between Andy Devine Avenue and Beale Street in Kingman, Arizona. The locomotive was listed in the National Register of Historic Places on May 14, 1986, reference #86001113.
Historic AT&SF Locomotive #3759
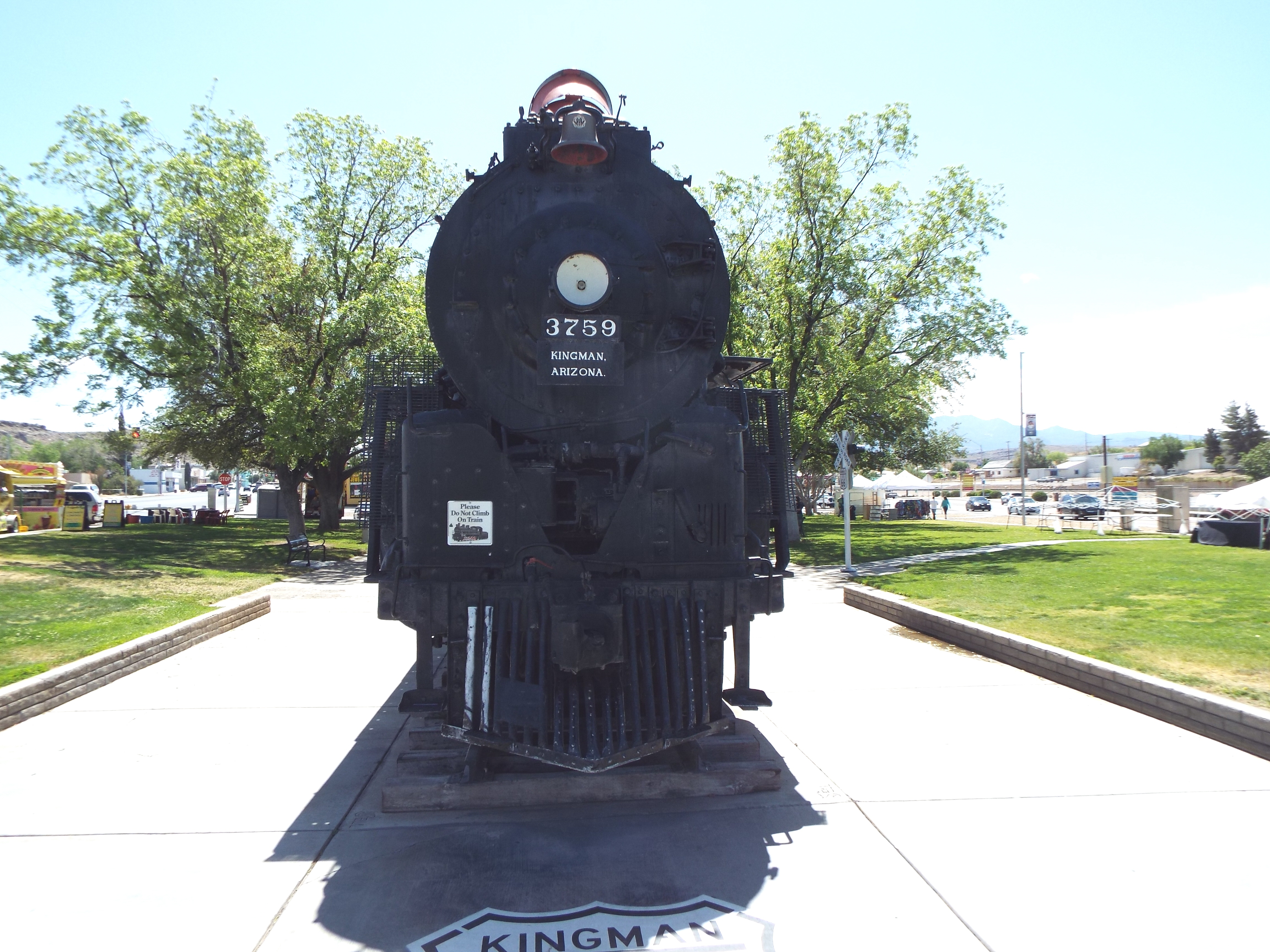
Steam Engine #3759

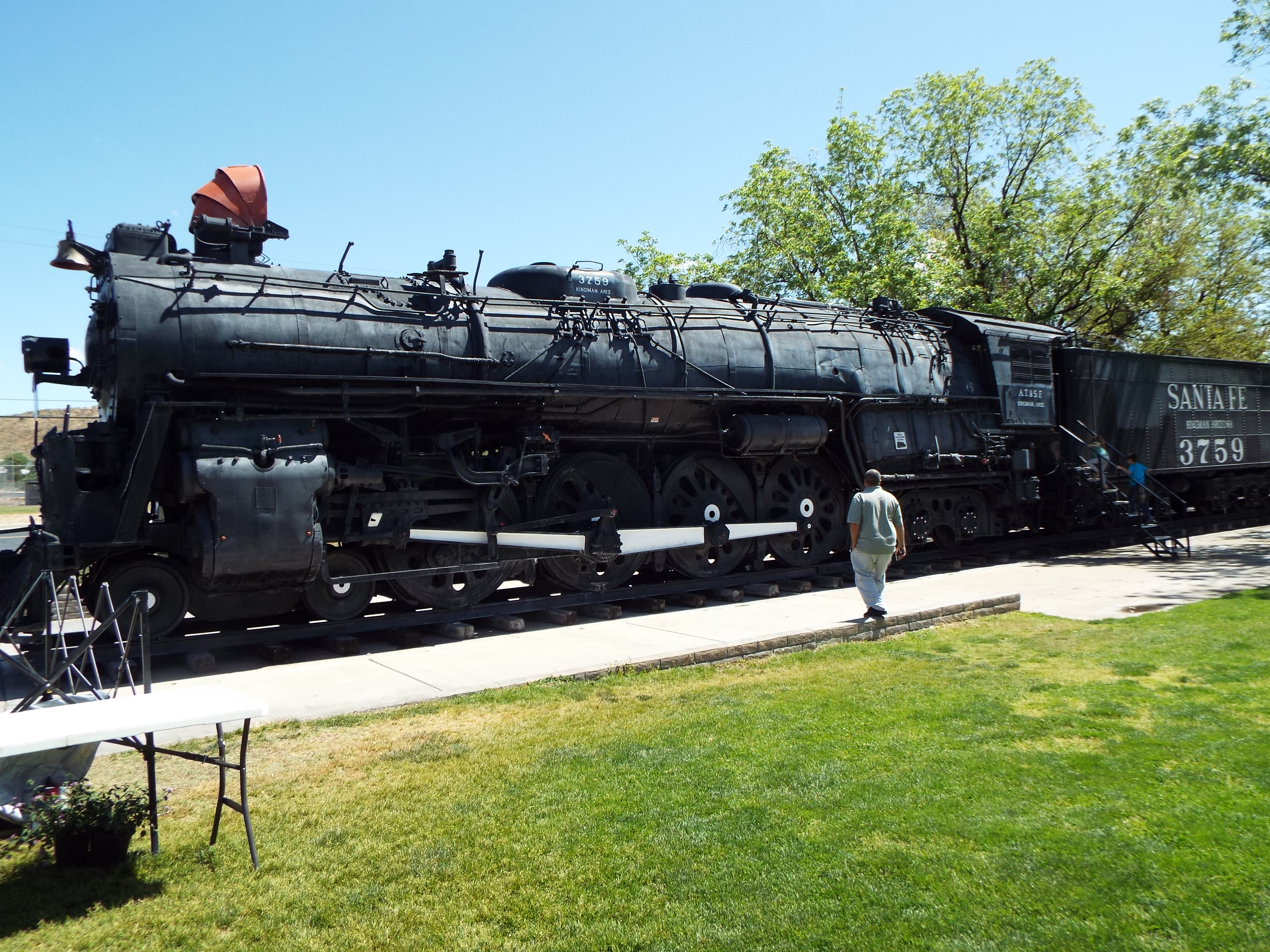
Steam Engine #3759

=== Historic District ===
- The Kingman Commercial Historic District – The district includes the 300 and 400 blocks of the Andy Devine Ave. The architectural styles of the contributing properties include Moderne, Queen Anne, and Mission/Spanish Revival some of which were designed by W. Royal Lescher. The district was listed in the National Register of Historic Places on May 14, 1986, reference #86001153. The Luthy Block was established in 1908.
Kingman Commercial Historic District

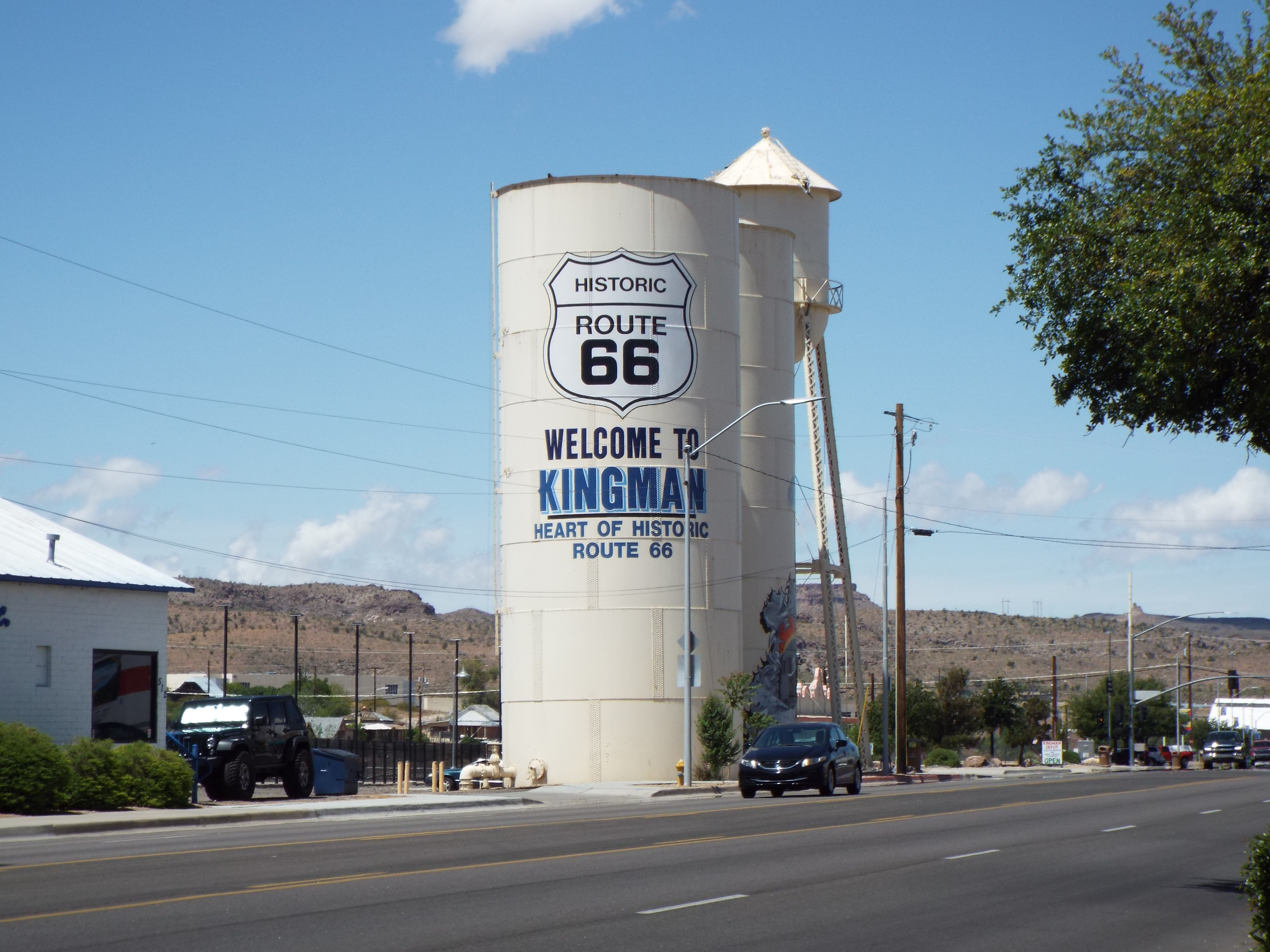
Santa Fe Fuel and Water Tank

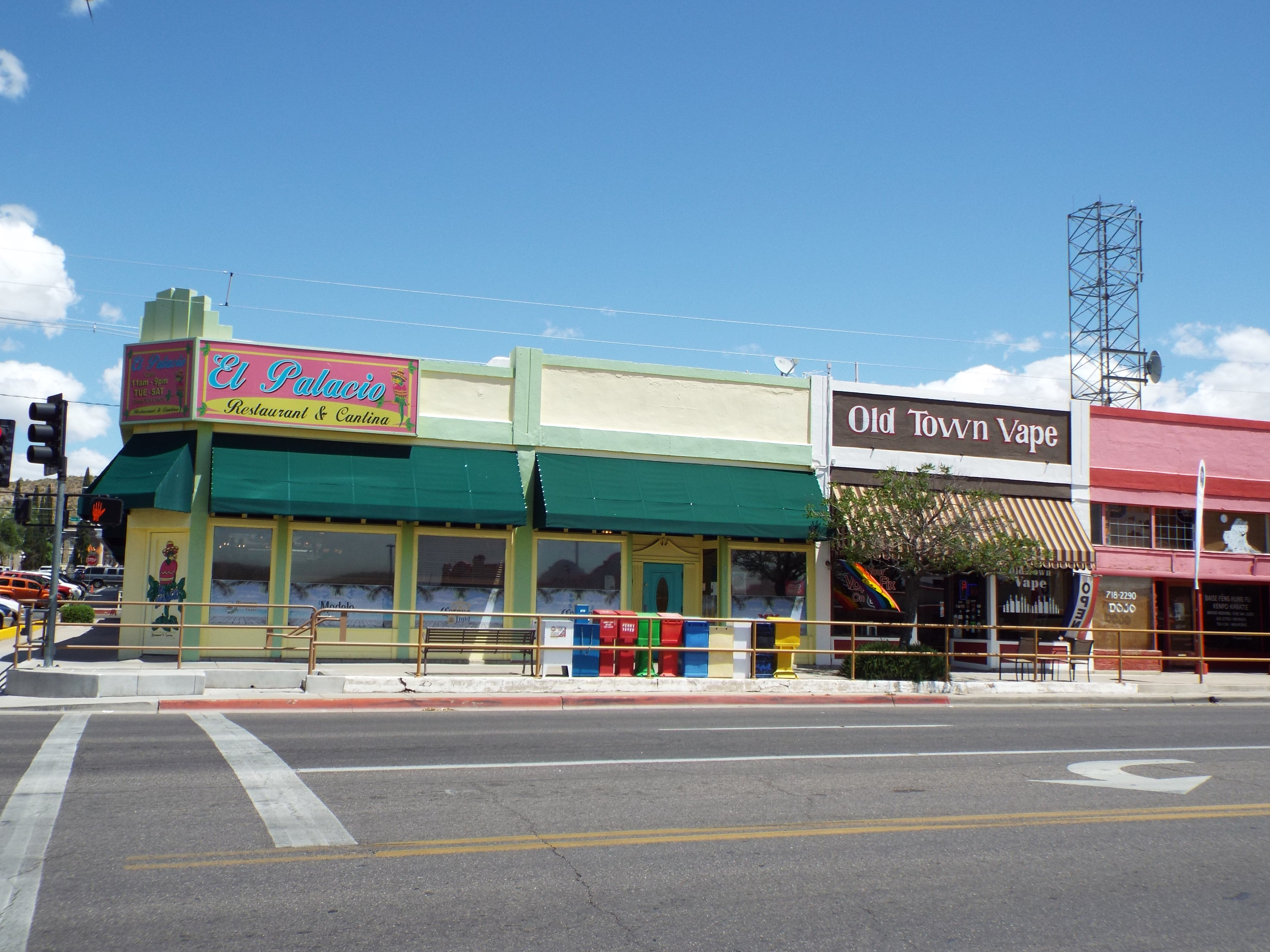
Luthy Block

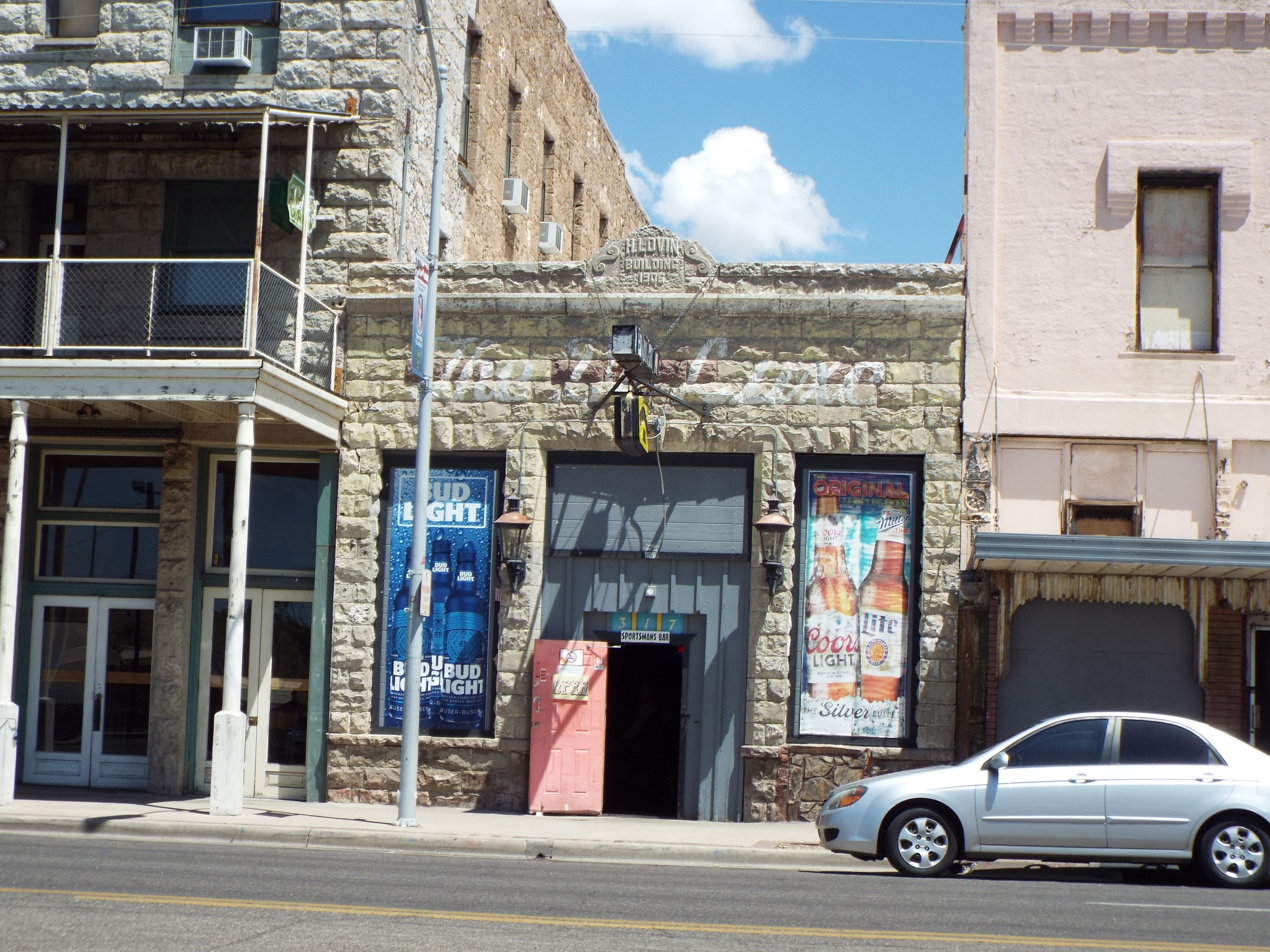
Historical contributing structures on Andy Devine Ave.

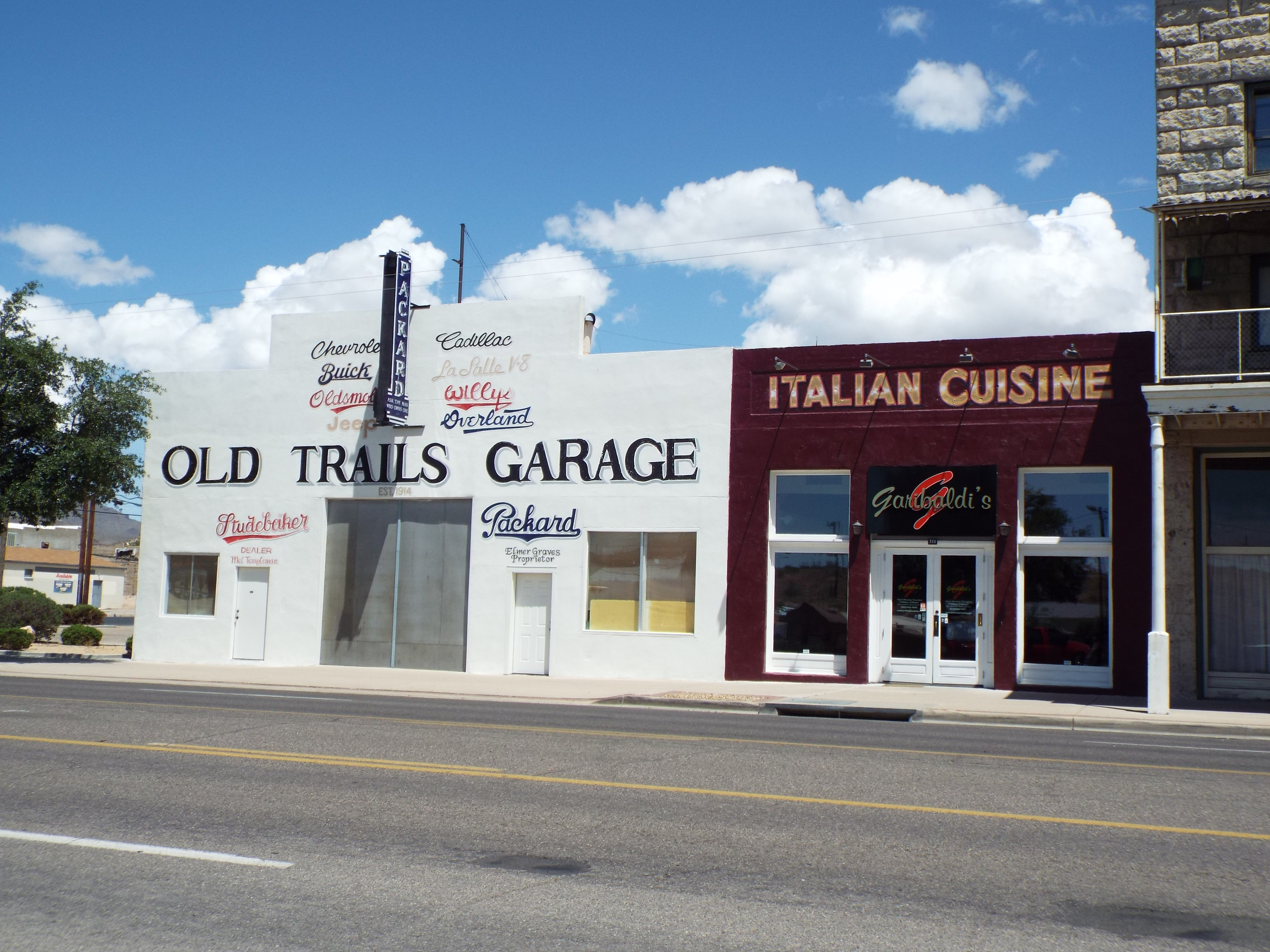
Additional historical contributing structures on Andy Devine Ave.

=== Buildings ===
The following historic business structures are either listed in the National Register of Historic Places individually or as contributing factors within the Historic Kingman Commercial District. The names posted are the original names used when first built.

- The Armour and Jacobson Building – built in 1921 and located at 426-430 Beale St. E. E. Armour was a baker and Robert Jacobson, a mining engineer. The building once housed a bakery and an assay office. Mr. Jacobson was consulting for several Mohave County mining companies. Listed in the National Register of Historic Places on May 14, 1986, reference: #86001112.
- The AT and T Building – built in 1930 and located at Pine and 3rd Sts.. Listed in the National Register of Historic Places on May 14, 1986, reference: #86001114.
- The Brunswick Hotel – built in 1909 and located at 315 E Andy Devine Ave. (formerly Front Street). It was the first three-story building in the county and surrounding counties in Arizona. Clark Gable is among the celebrities who have stayed in the hotel. Listed in the National Register of Historic Places within the Kingman Commercial Historic District on May 14, 1986, reference: #86001153.
- The Building on 409 Andy Devine Ave. – built-in 1908 and located at 409 Andy Devine Ave. (formerly Front Street). this building was home to the White Wind Tiger Foundation – Martial Arts establishment. Listed in the National Register of Historic Places within the Kingman Commercial Historic District on May 14, 1986, NRHP Reference Number: 86001153.
- The Central Commercial Building – built in 1917 and located at 154 N 4th St. It was known as America's most amazing country store when it first opened. Listed in the National Register of Historic Places within the Kingman Commercial Historic District on May 14, 1986, reference: #86001153.
- The Desert Power & Water Co. – built in 1907 and location bounded by AT&SF railroad tracks, Spillway Ln., Park, and 1st Sts.. The oil-fired plant was considered one of the largest steam electric power plants in the Western United States. It had a powerhouse, transformer house and office. It operated until 1938 when the Hoover Dam took over the power supply operations. Listed in the National Register of Historic Places on May 14, 1986, reference: #86001137.
- The Elk's Lodge#468 – built in 1903 and located at 4th and Oak Streets. The stone used to build the lodge came from the Metcalfe Quarry. Listed in the National Register of Historic Places on May 14, 1986, reference: #86001138.
- The W. A. Gruninger Building – built in 1921 and located at 424 Beale St. Gruninger & Son built it as an investment property. The first floor was a storefront for rent. The second floor had office space. Listed in the National Register of Historic Places on May 14, 1986, reference: #86001141.
- The H. Lovin Building – built in 1906 and located at 317 Andy Devine Ave. (formerly Front Street). Henry Lovin was a businessman who had this structure built between the hotels Beale and Brunswick. Listed in the National Register of Historic Places within the Kingman Commercial Historic District on May 14, 1986, reference: #86001153.
- The Hotel Beale – built in 1900 and located at 325 E Andy Devine Ave. (formerly Front Street). In 1906 the Beale Hotel was purchased by Tom Devine, father of actor Andy Devine. Clark Gable and Carole Lombard spent the night there. It was once the premier hotel in Kingman. Listed in the National Register of Historic Places within the Kingman Commercial Historic District on May 14, 1986, reference: #86001153.
- The IOOF Building – built in 1912 and located at 208 N. 5th St.. IOOF stands for Independent Order of Odd Fellows. This building was the second fraternal organization clubhouse in Kingman. Listed in the National Register of Historic Places on May 14, 1986, reference: #86001150.
- The Lovin & Withers Investment House – built in 1914 and located at 722 E. Beale St.. Listed in the National Register of Historic Places on May 14, 1986, reference: #86001161.
- The Lovin and Withers Cottages – built in 1916 and located at 8th and Topeka. Listed in the National Register of Historic Places on May 14, 1986, reference: #86001159.
- The Masonic Temple – built in 1939 and located at 212 N. 4th St. Listed in the National Register of Historic Places on May 19, 1986, reference: #86001164.
- The Mohave County Courthouse and Jail – built in 1909 and located at 310 N. 4th St.. Listed in the National Register of Historic Places on August 25, 1983, reference: #83002990.
- The Old Trails Garage-built in 1915 and located at 307 and 308 Andy Devine Ave. (formerly Front Street). Listed in the National Register of Historic Places within the Kingman Commercial Historic District on May 14, 1986, reference: #86001153.
- The Ed Thompson's Saloon – built in 1915 and located at 311 Andy Devine Ave .(formerly Front Street). The building once housed the "Italian Cuisine". Listed in the National Register of Historic Places within the Kingman Commercial Historic District on May 14, 1986, reference: #86001153.
- The Kingman Santa Fe Depot – built in 1907 and located at 400 E. Andy Devine Ave. (formerly Front Street). Listed in the National Register of Historic Places within the Kingman Commercial Historic District on May 14, 1986, NRHP Reference Number: 86001153.
- The G. H. Sullivan Lodging House – built in 1911 and located at 218 E. Oak. Listed in the National May 14, 1986, reference: #86001168.
- The U.S. Post Office in Kingman – built in 1935 and located at 310 N. 4th St.. Listed in the National Register of Historic Places on May 14, 1986, reference: #86001173.
- The Van Marter Building – built in 1921 and located at 423-427 Beale St.. This building once housed Van Marter's mortician and shoemaking shops. It was listed in the National Register of Historic Places on May 14, 1986, reference: #86001174.
- The Watkins Pioneer Drugstore – built in 1883 and located at 401 E Andy Devine Ave.(formerly Front Street). H. H. Watkins and his brother F. F. Watkins opened in this location Kingman's first drugstore. Listed in the National Register of Historic Places within the Kingman Commercial Historic District on May 14, 1986, reference: #86001153.

Historic buildings not pictured:

- Kingman Army Air Forces Flexible Gunnery School Radio Tower – located at 7000 Flightline Dr. Listed in the National Register of Historic Places on February 5, 1999, reference: #99000107.
- The Mohave County Hospital – located W. Beale between Grand View and 1st St.. Listed in the National Register of Historic Places on May 14, 1986, reference: #86001165.
Historic buildings

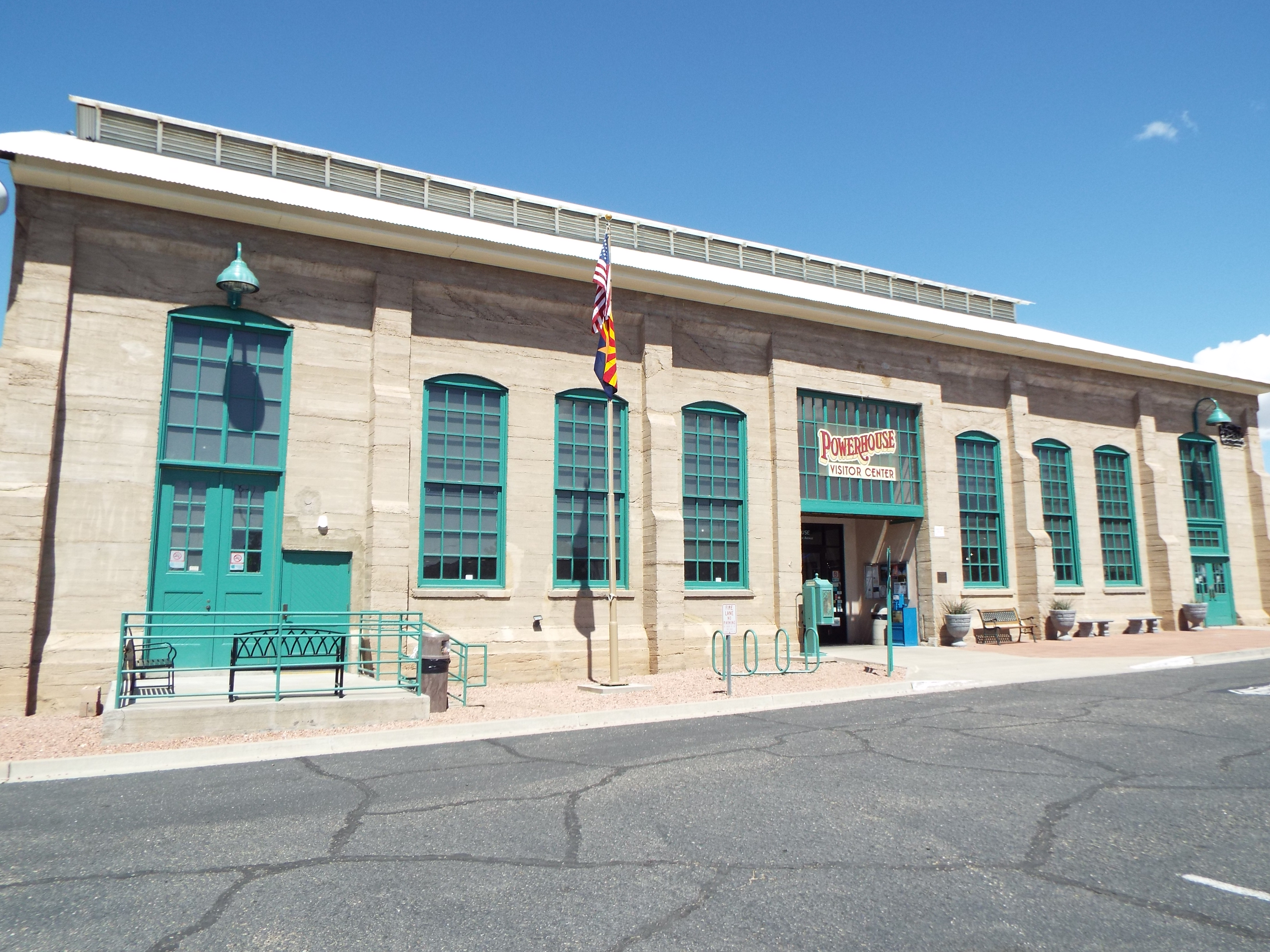
Desert Water and Power Co

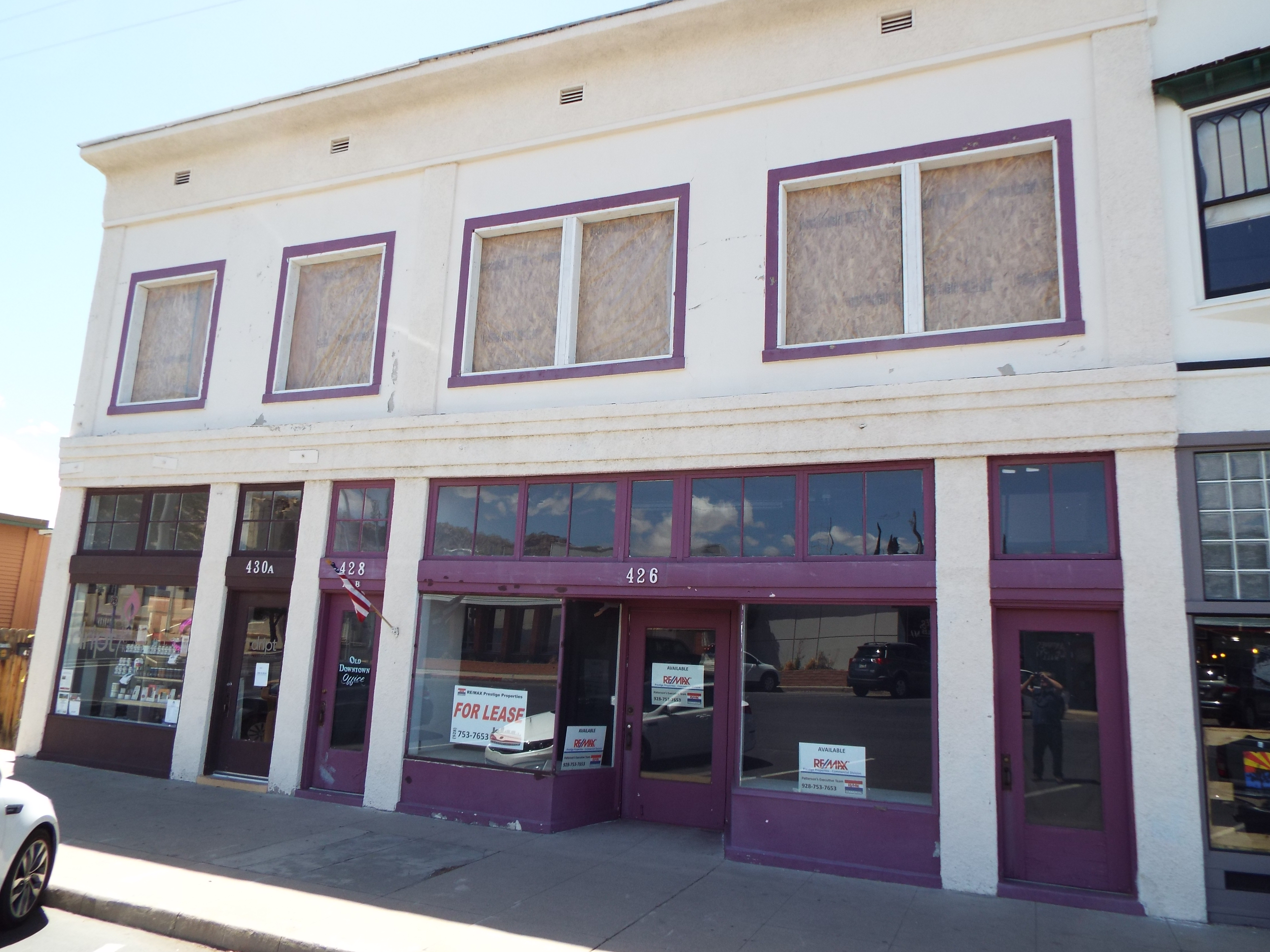
Armour and Jacobson Building – 1921

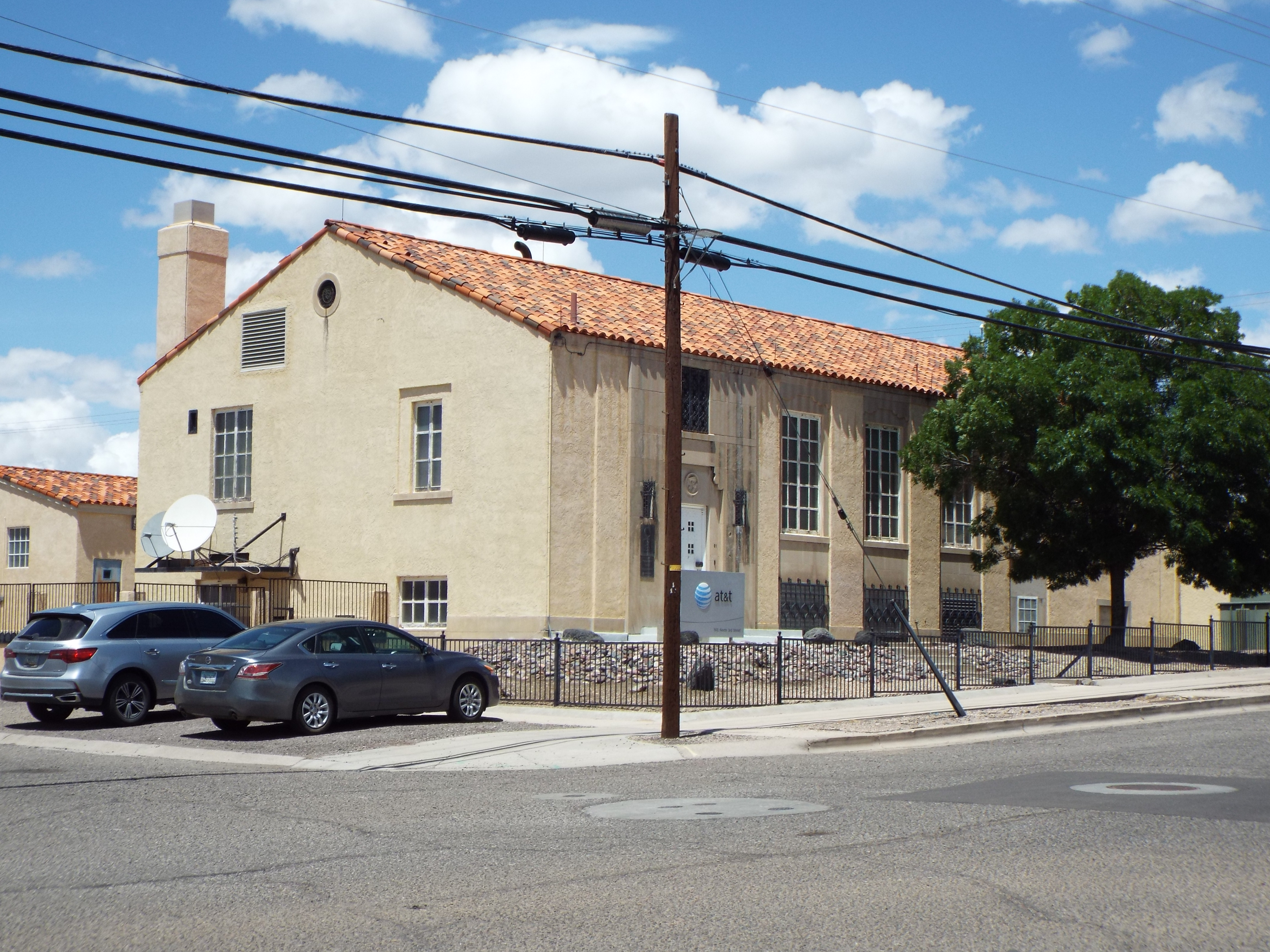
AT and T Building – 1930

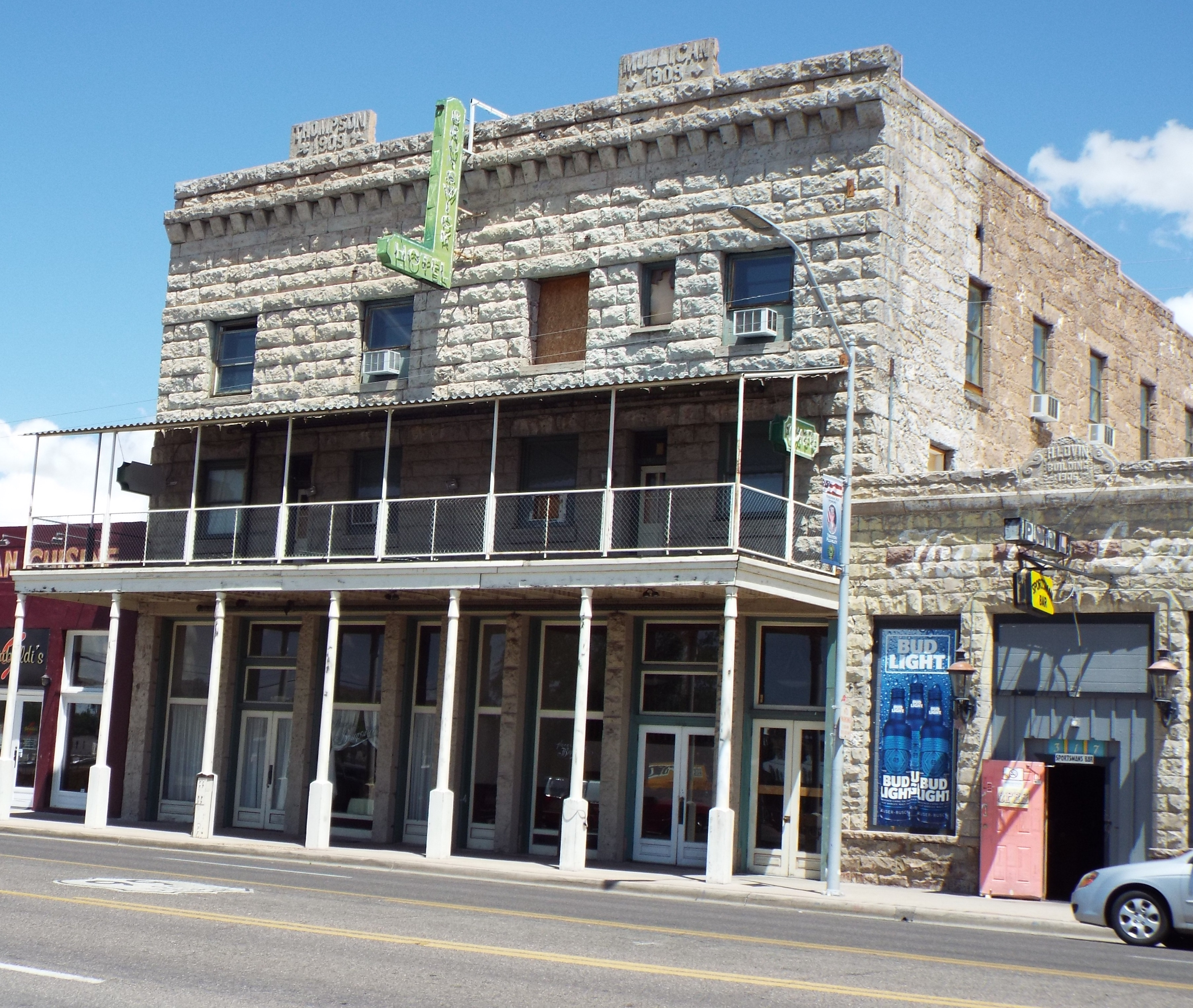
Brunswick Hotel – 1909

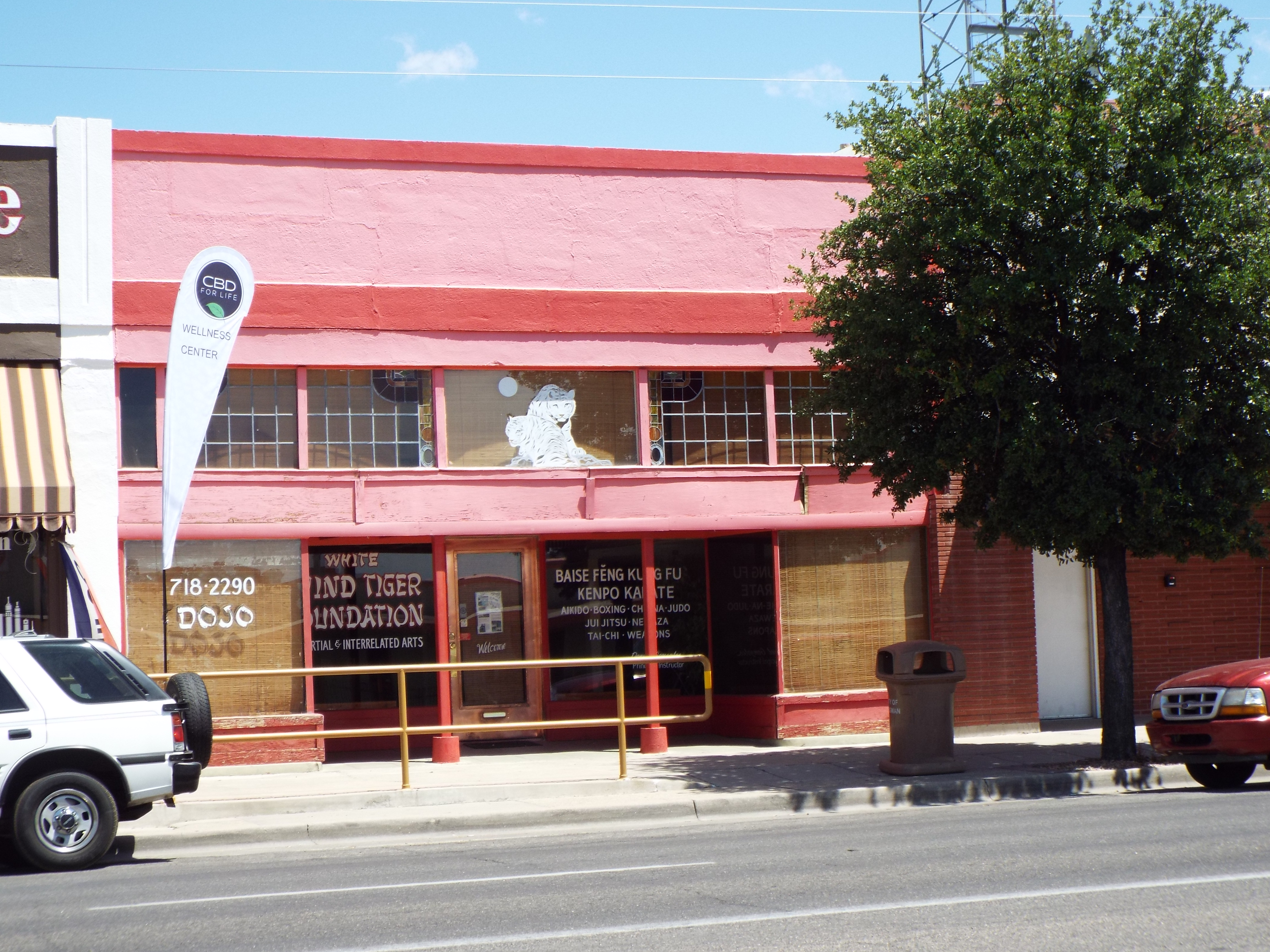
Building on 409 Andy Divine Ave. – 1908

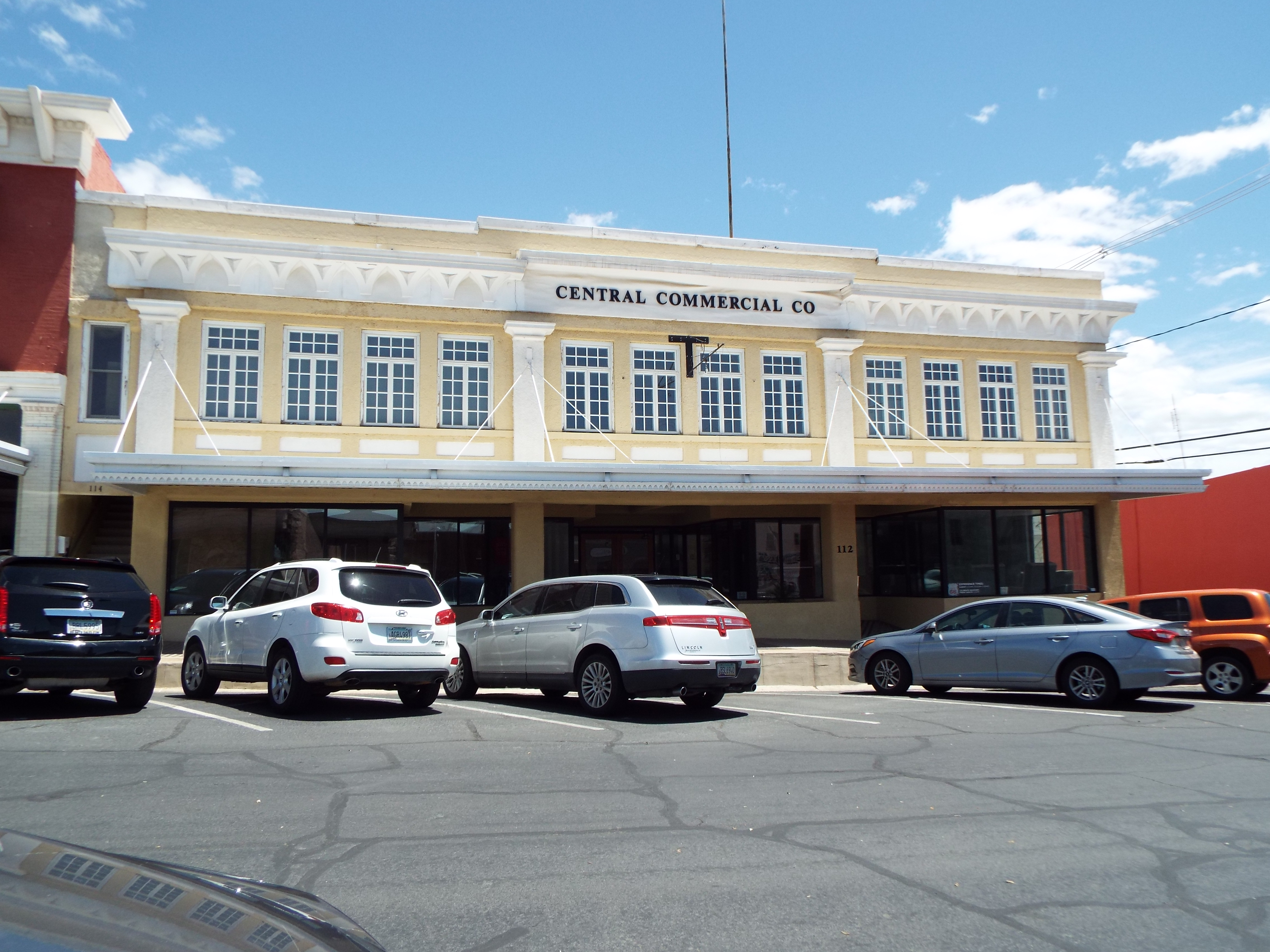
Central Commercial Building – 1917

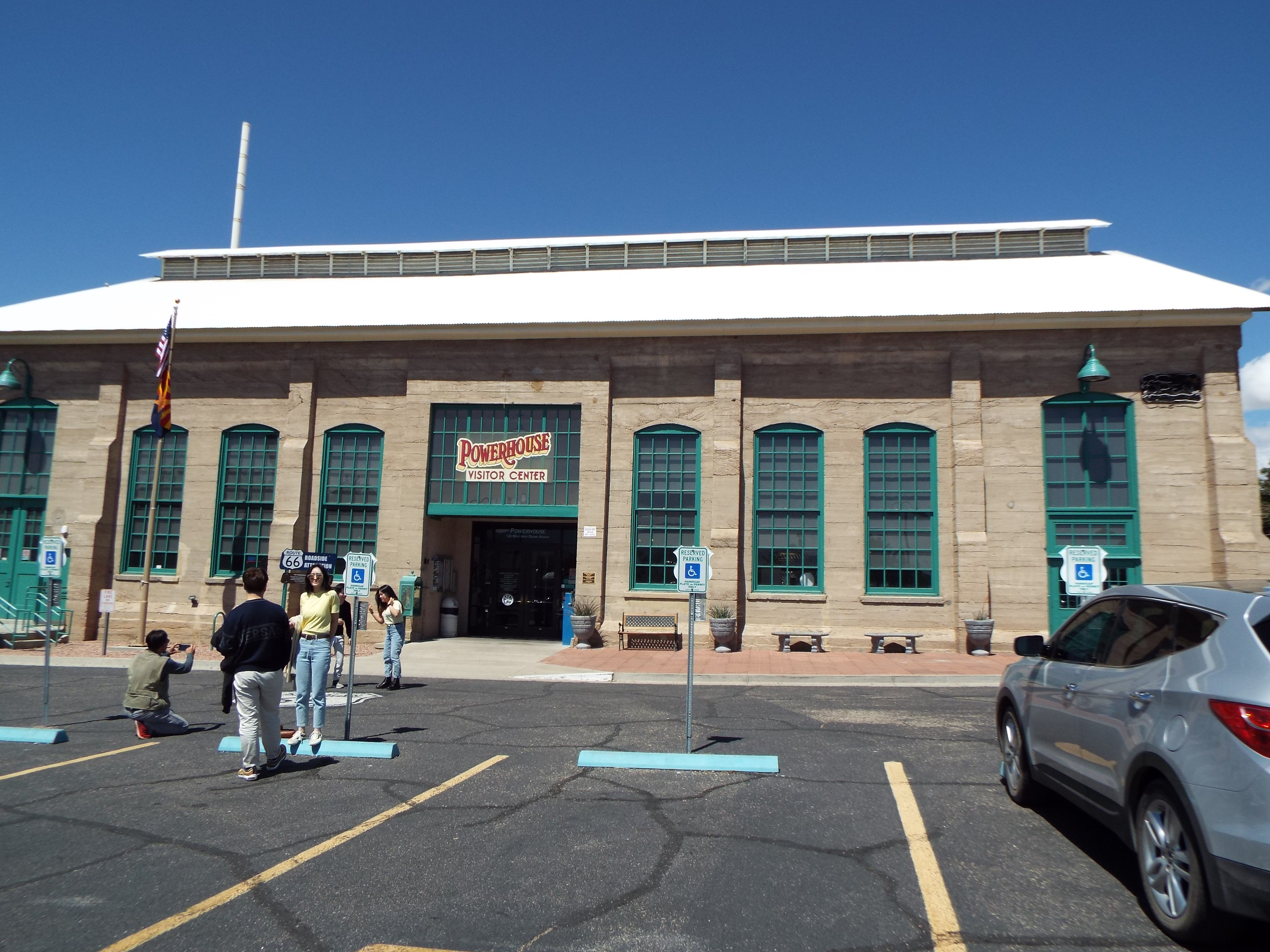
Desert Water and Power Co – 1907

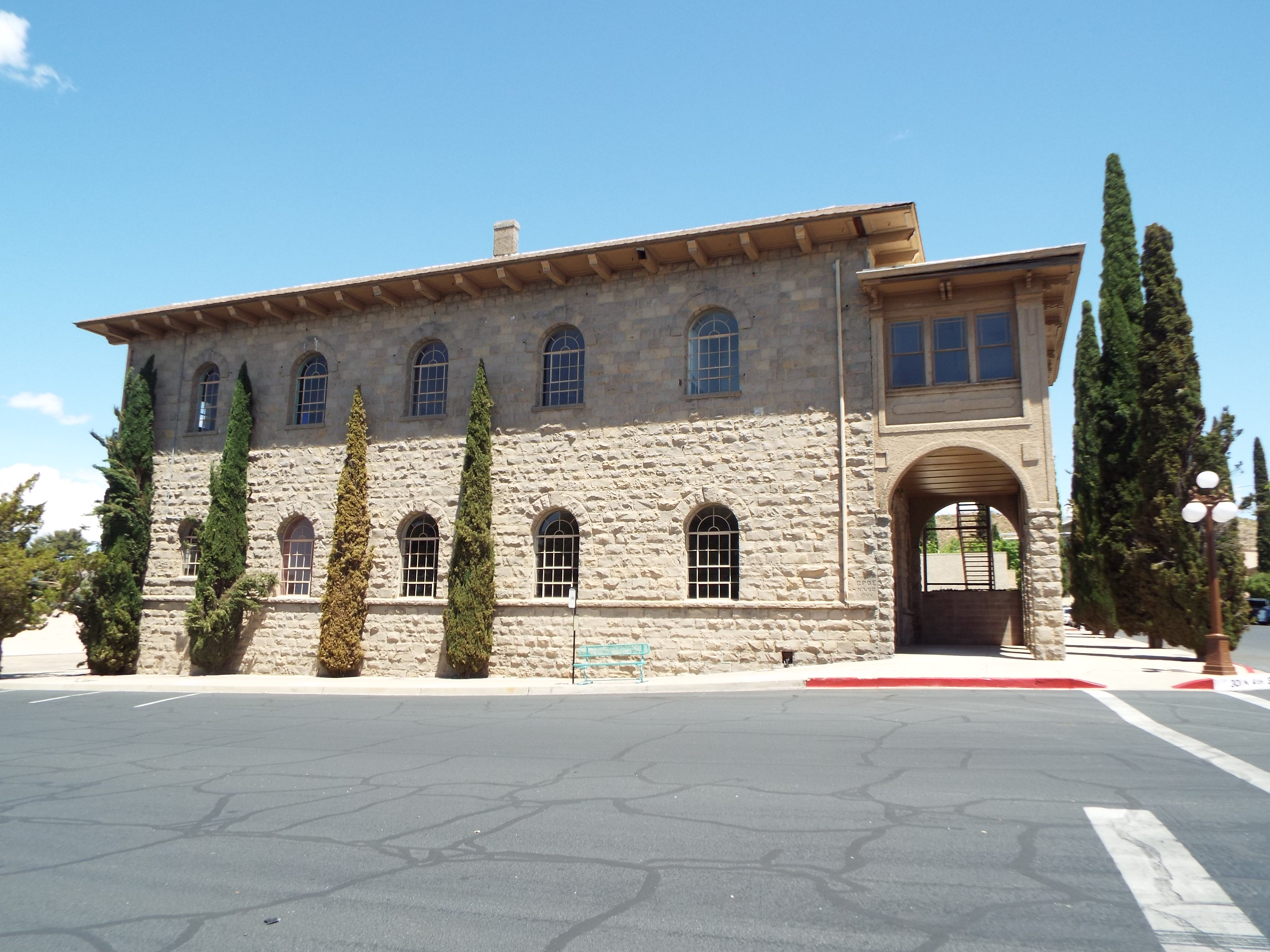
Elk's Lodge #468 – 1903

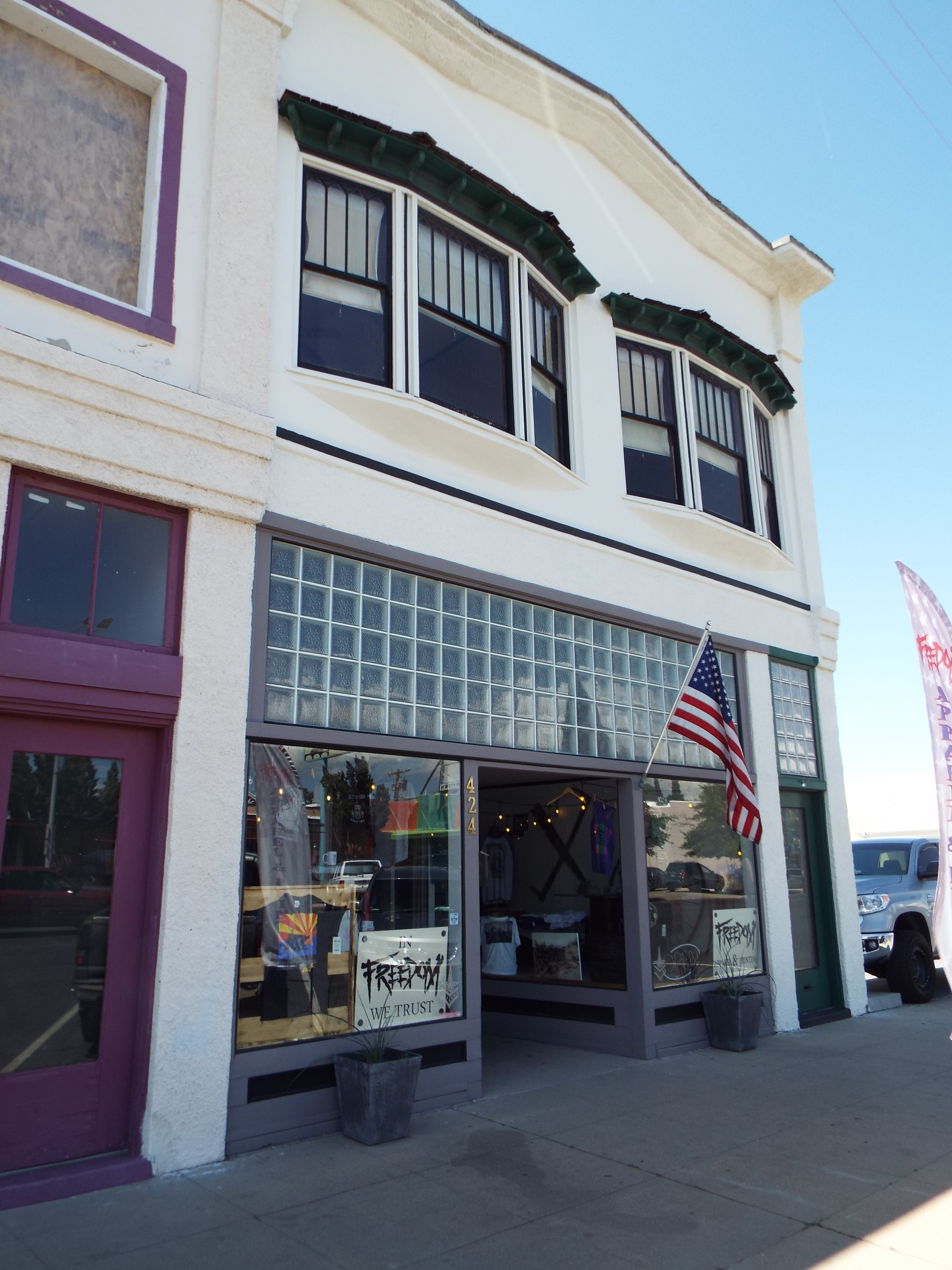
Gruninger Building – 1921

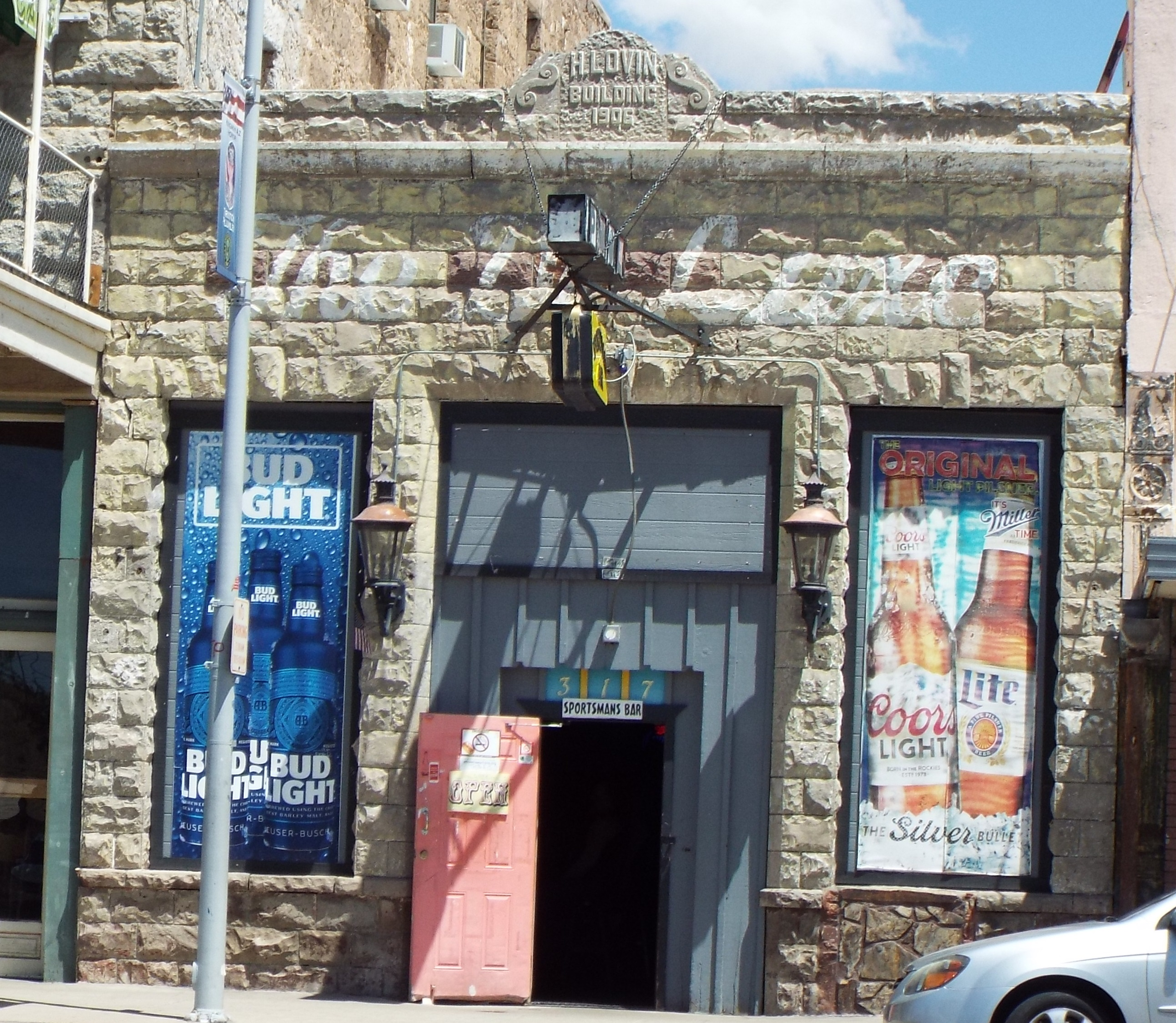
H. Lovin Building – 1906

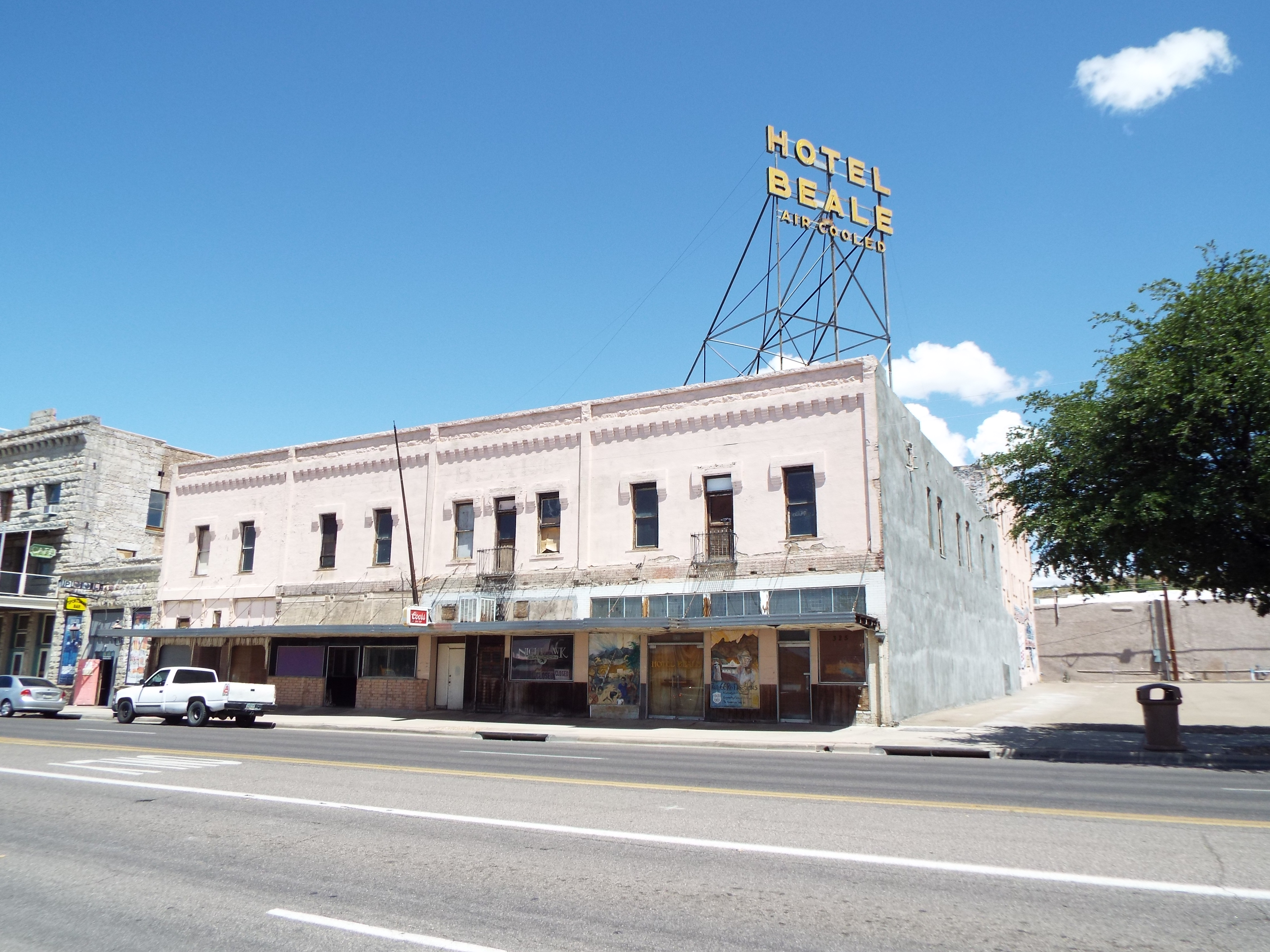
Hotel Beale – 1900

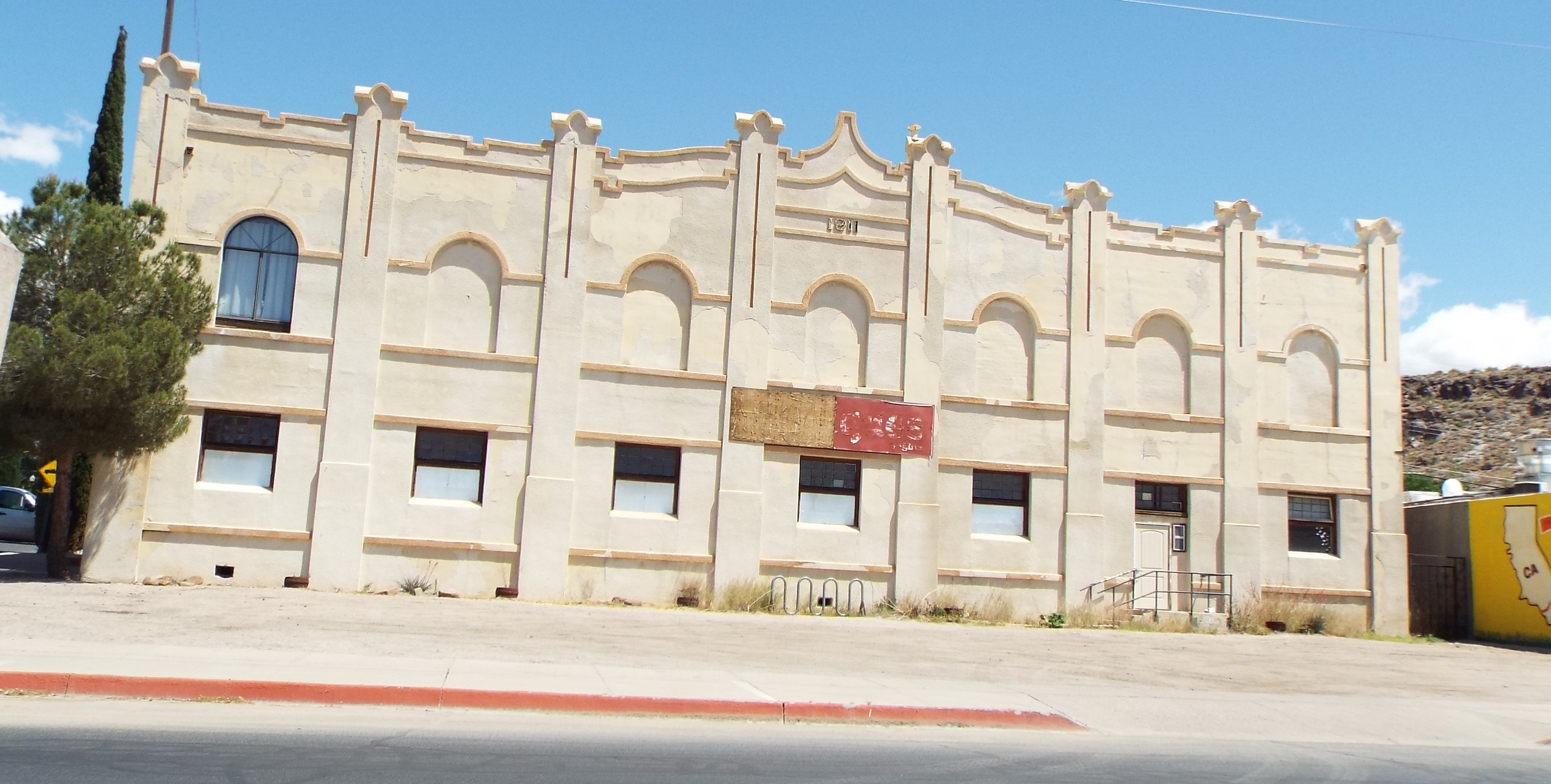
IOOF Building – 1912

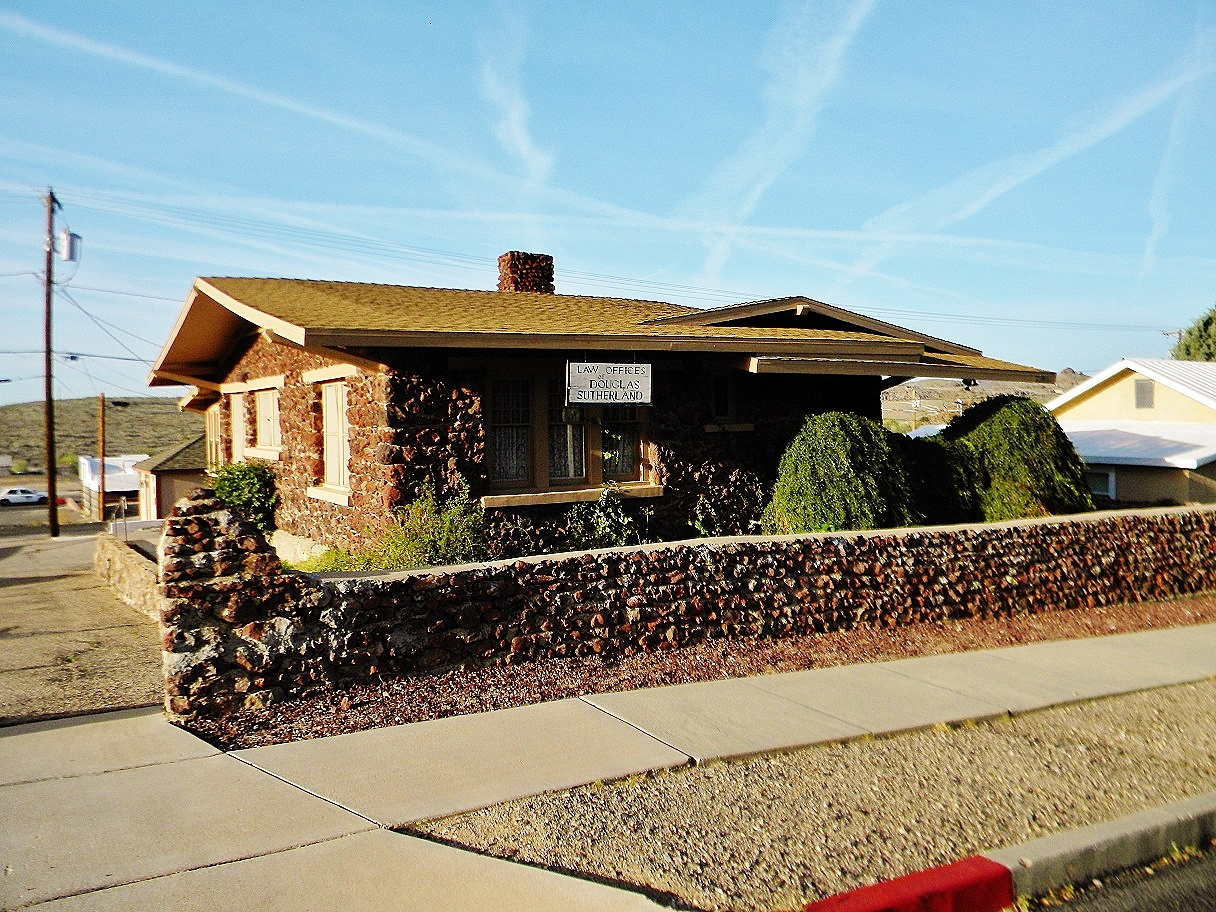
Lovin & Withers Investment House

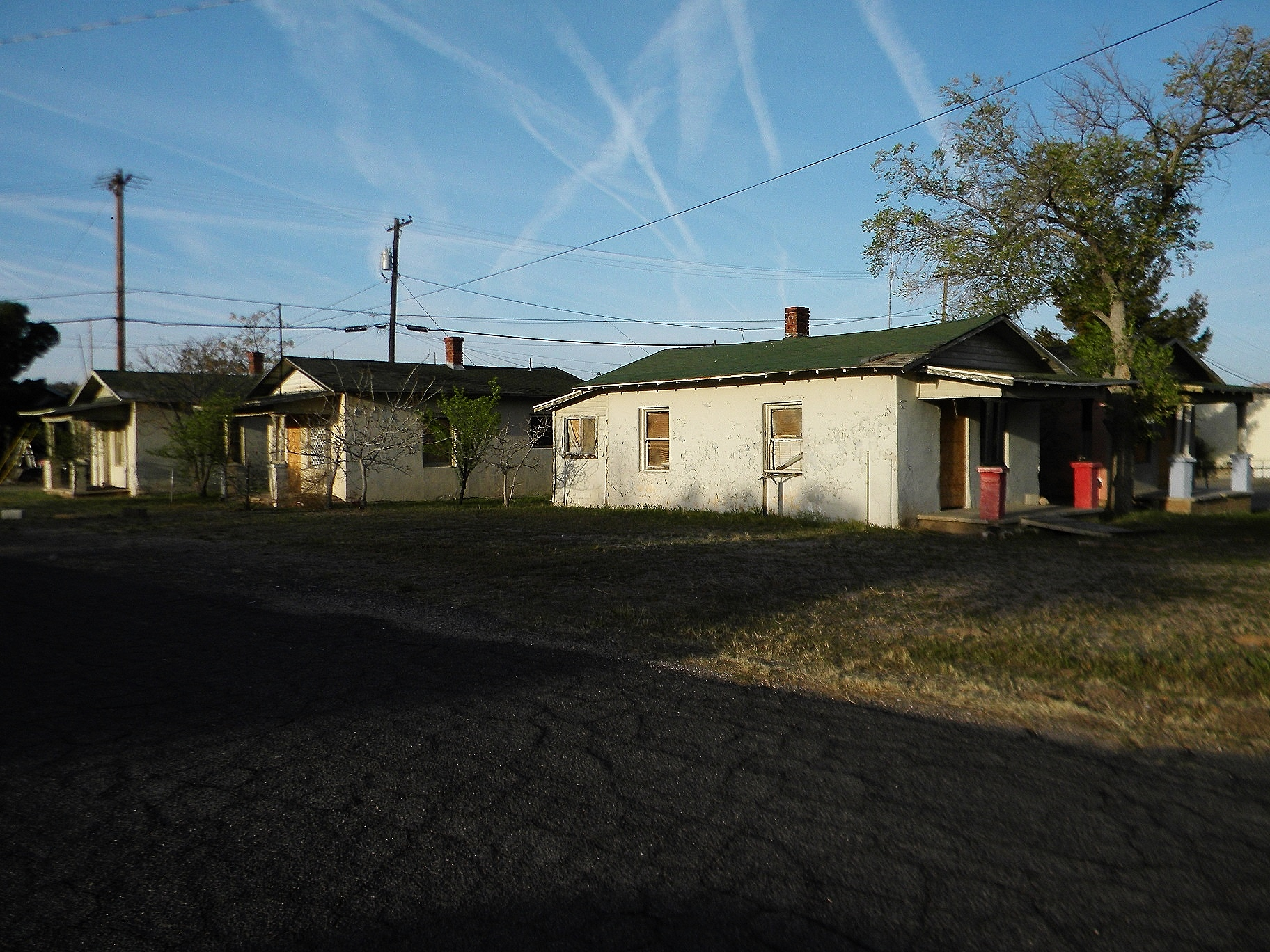
Lovin and Withers Cottages

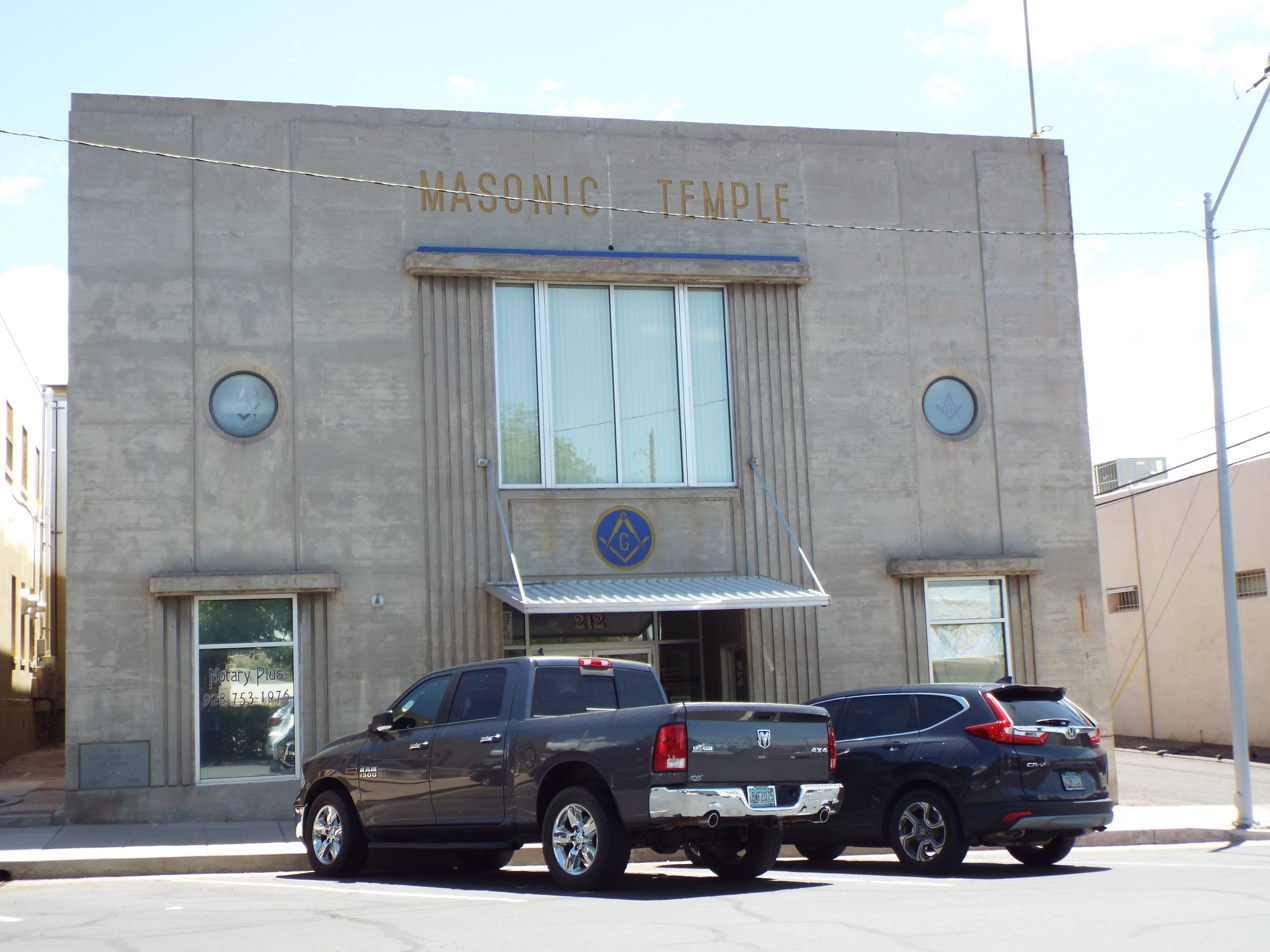
Masonic Temple – 1939

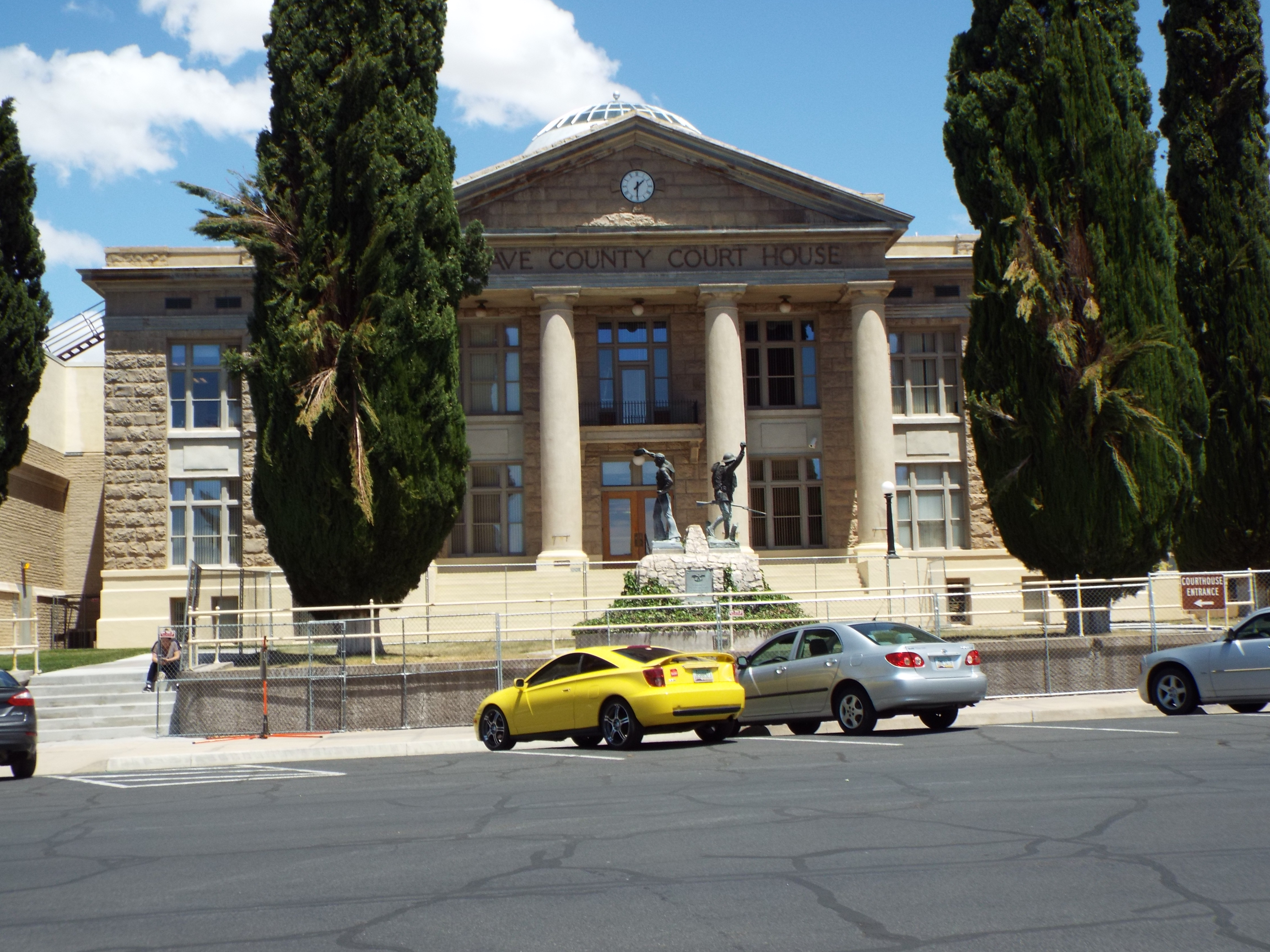
Mohave County Courthouse and Jail – 1909

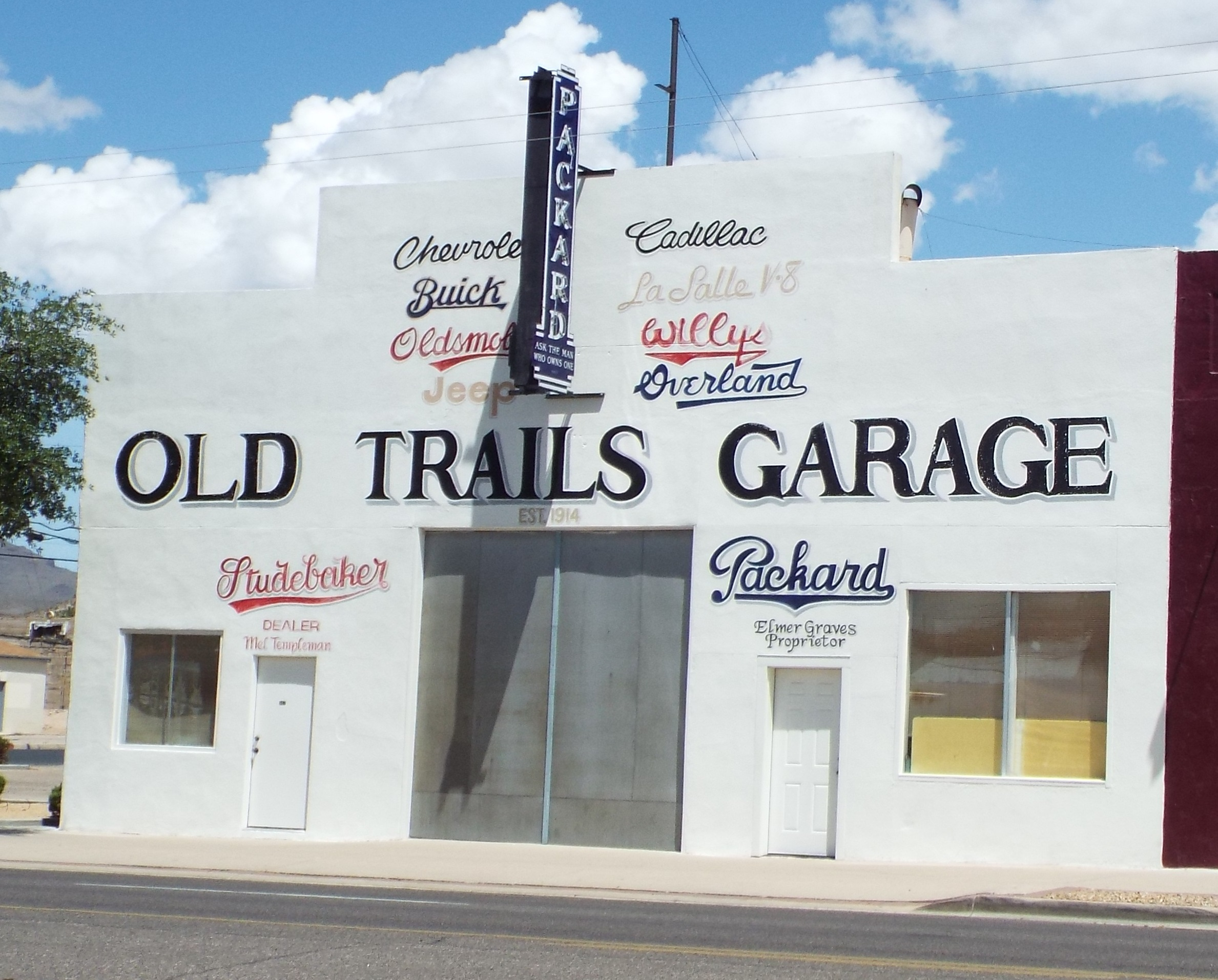
Old Trails Garage – 1915

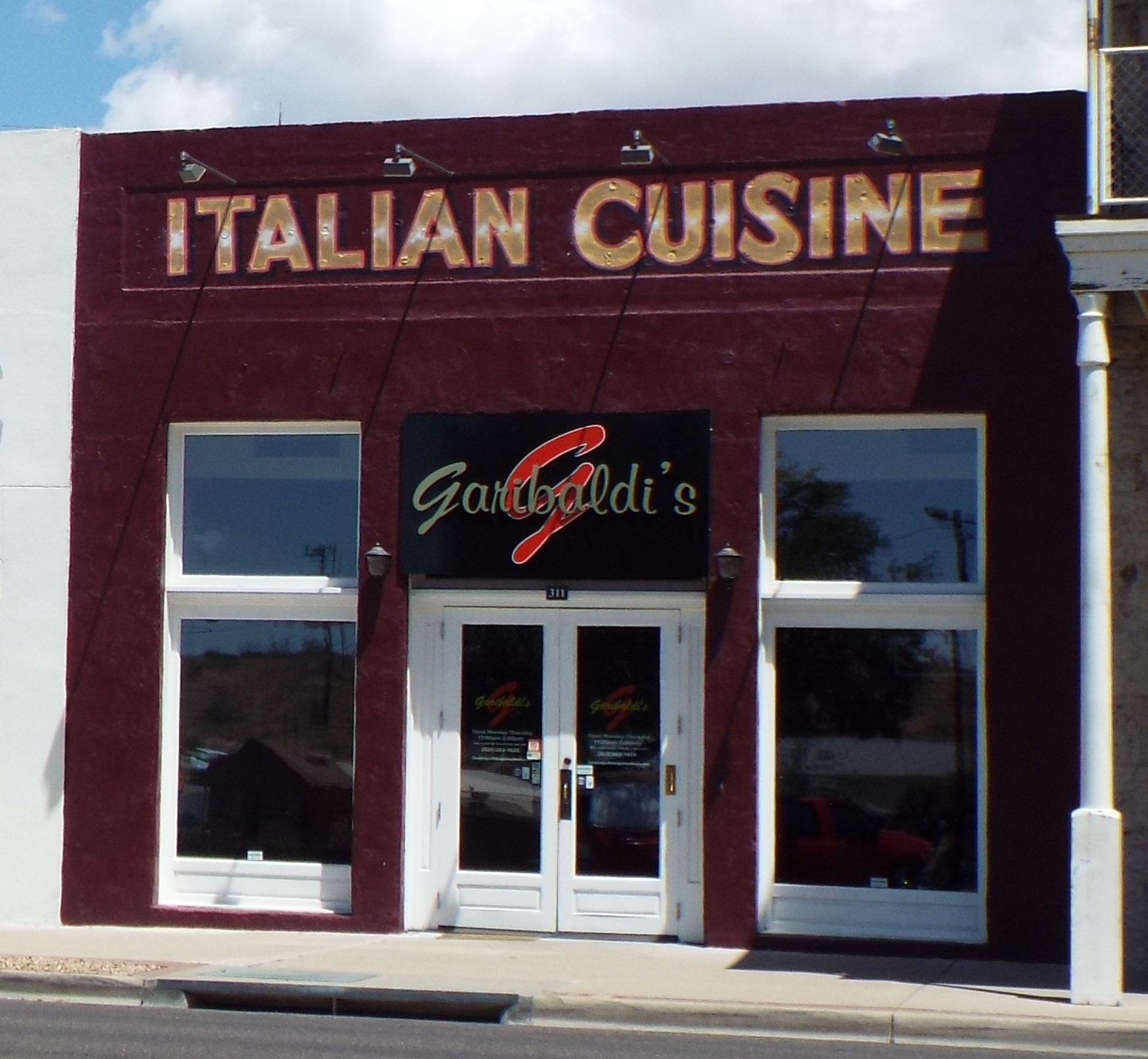
Ed Thompson's Saloon – 1915

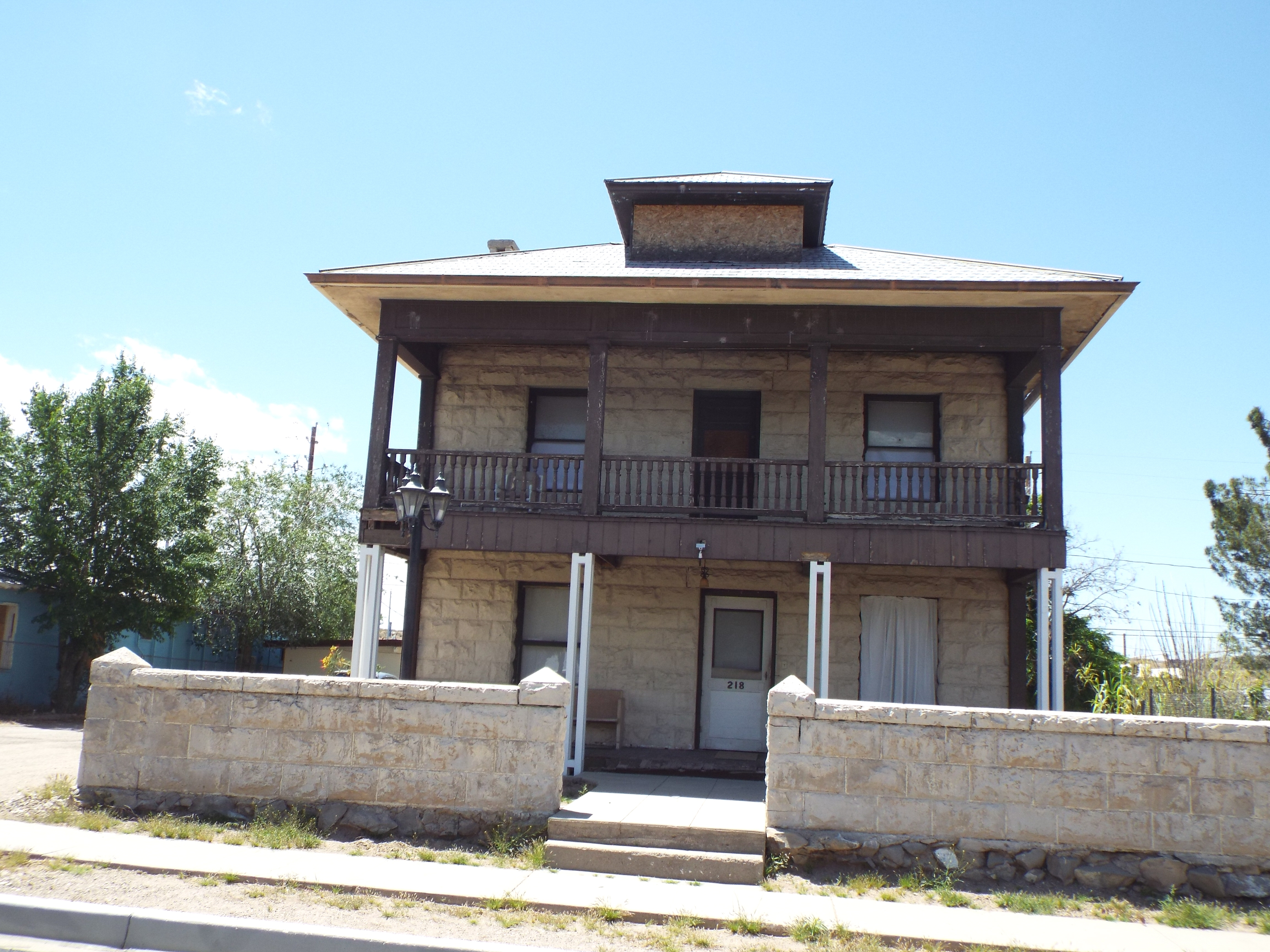
G. H. Sullivan Lodging House – 1911

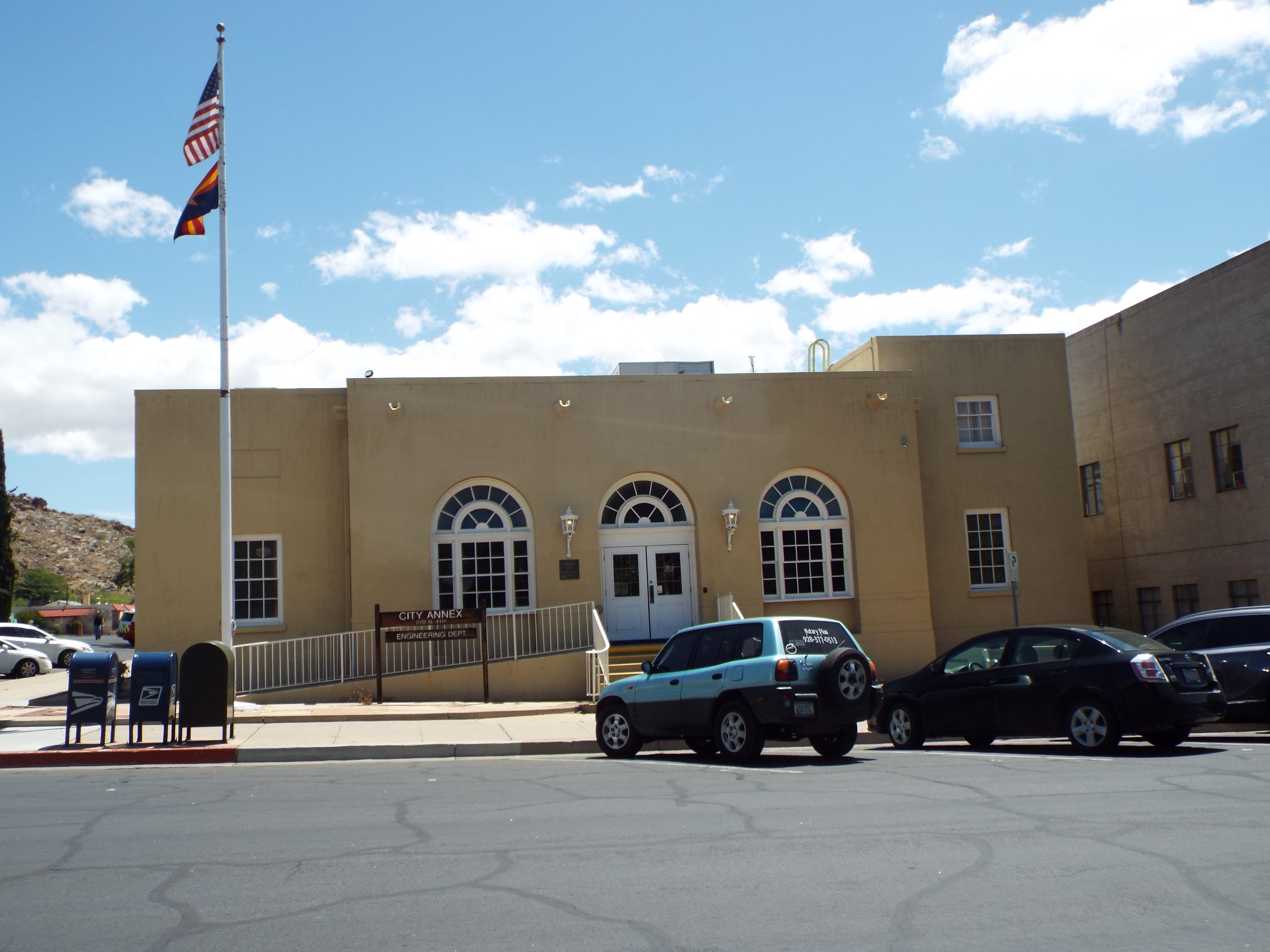
U.S. Post Office in Kingman – 1935

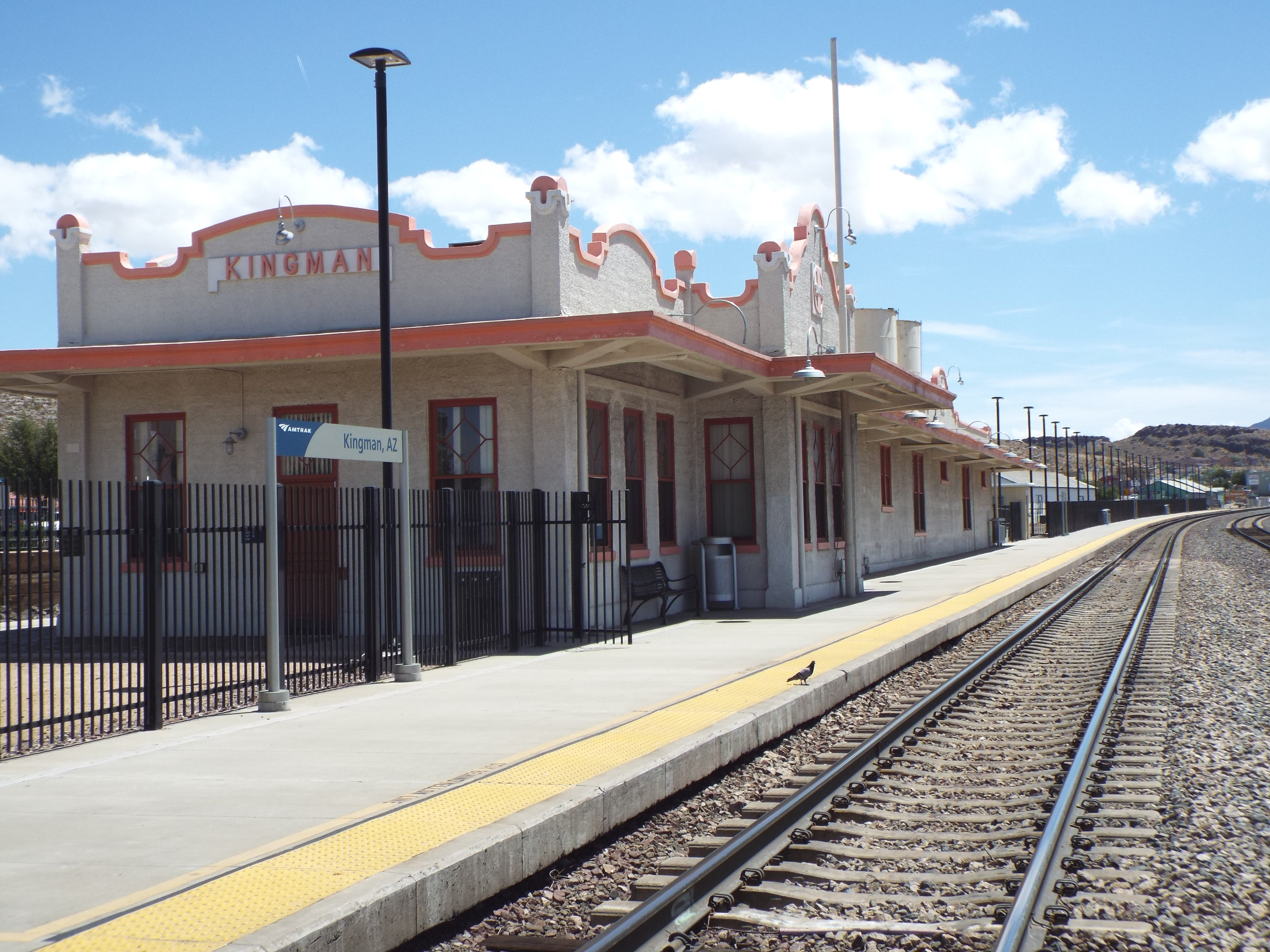
Santa Fe Depot – 1907

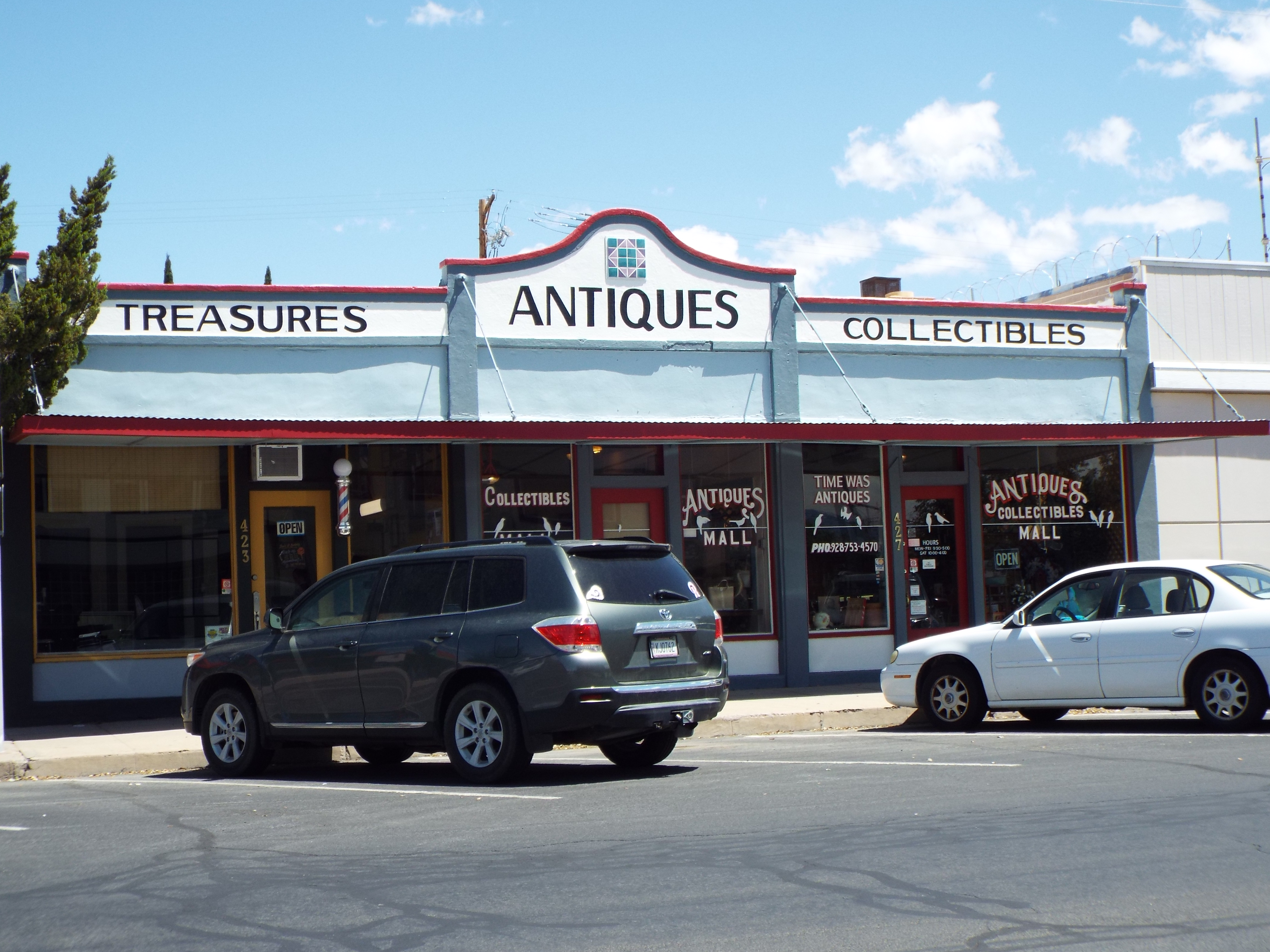
Van Marter Building – 1921

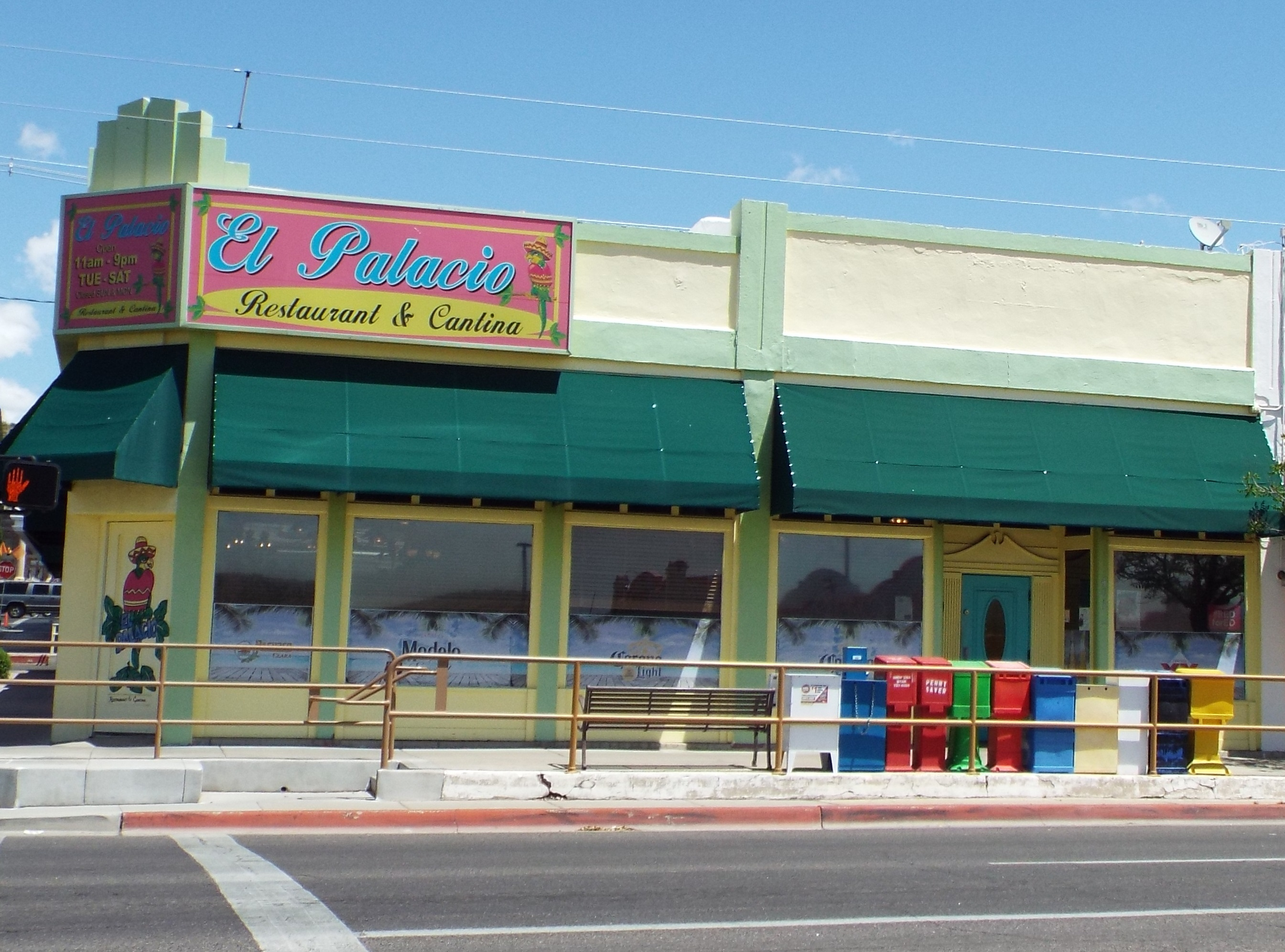
Watkins Pioneer Drugstore-1888

=== Houses of religious worship ===
- Assembly of God Church – built in 1939 and located at 502 Park Lane.
- Saint John's Methodist Episcopal Church – built in 1917 and located at Spring and 5th Streets. On March 29, 1939, Clark Gable and Carole Lombard were married there. Listed in the National Register of Historic Places on May 14, 1986, reference: #86001170.
- St. Mary's Catholic Church and Rectory – built in 1906 and located on 3rd and Spring Streets. Listed in the National Register of Historic Places on May 14, 1986, reference: #86001166.
Houses of religious worship
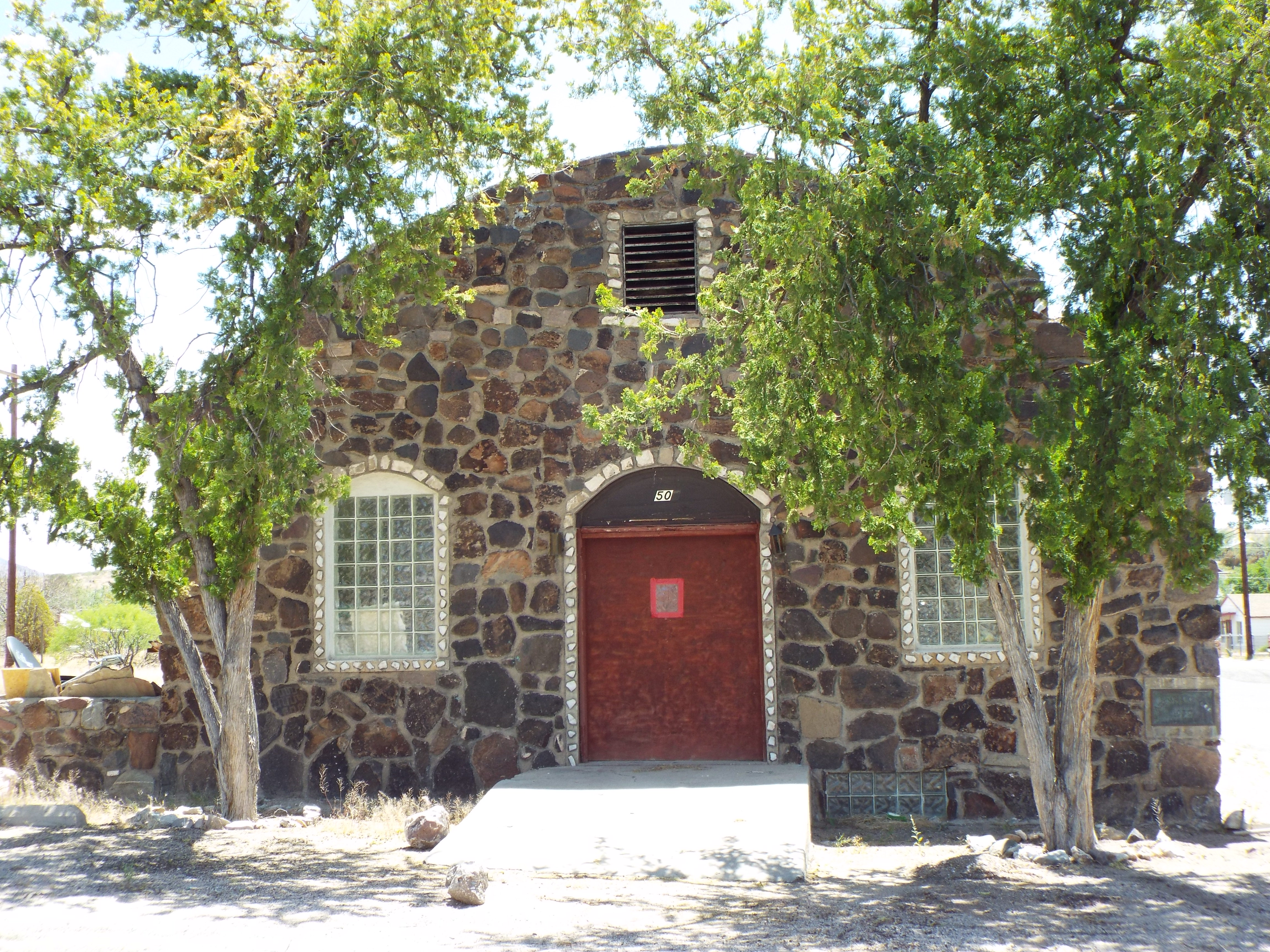
Assembly of God Church – 1939

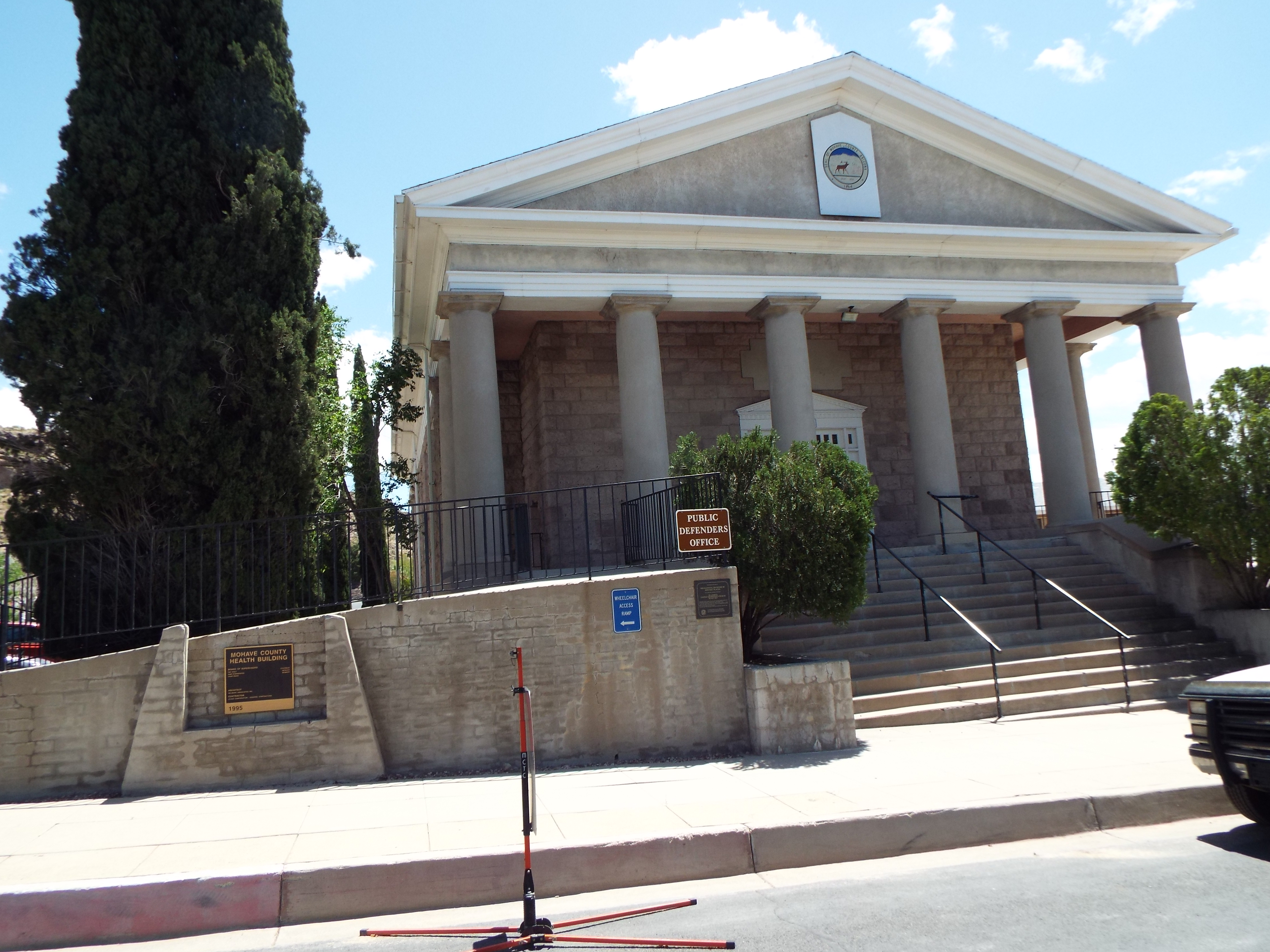
Saint John's Methodist Episcopal Church – 1917

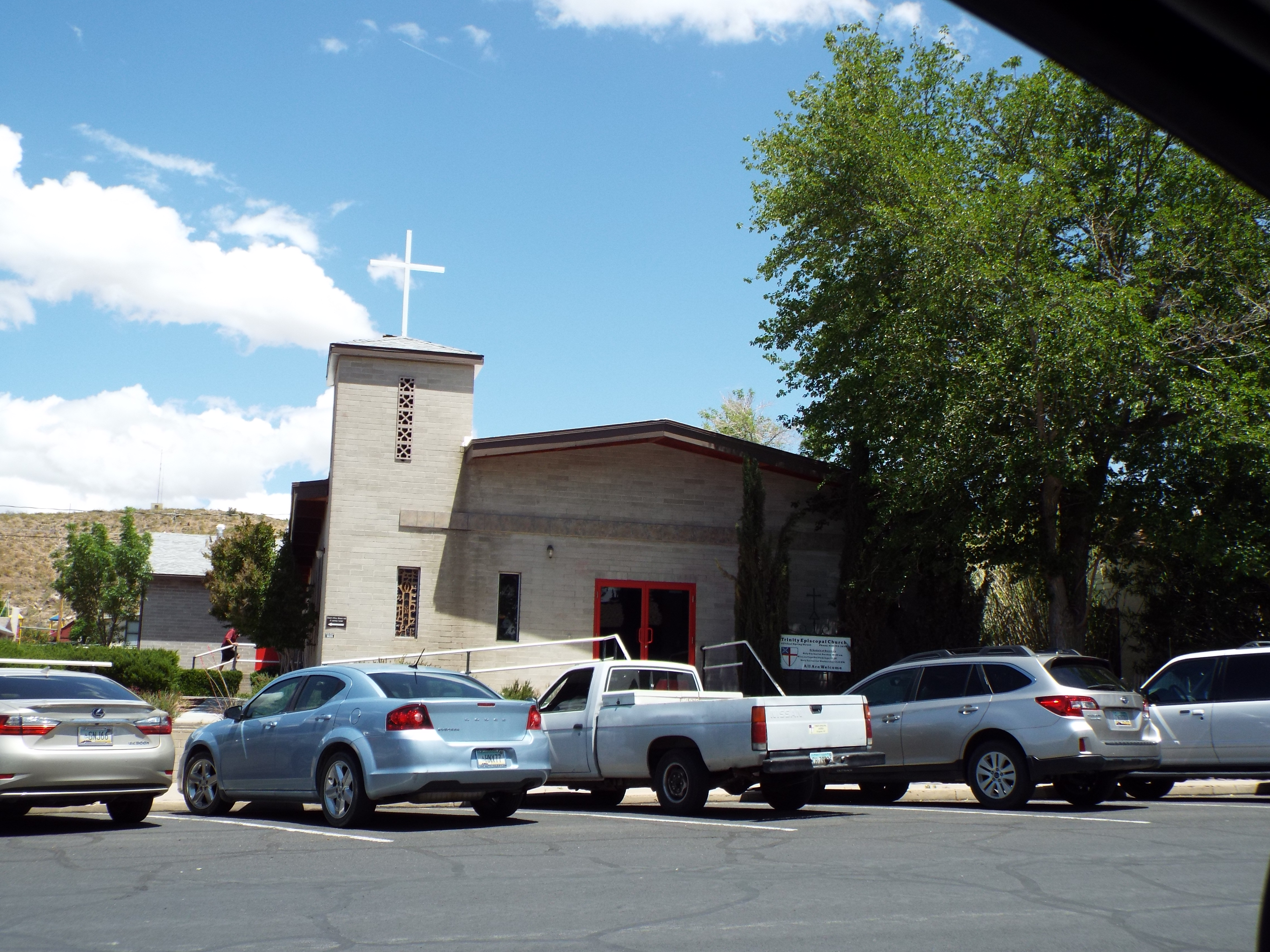
Trinity Episcopal Church

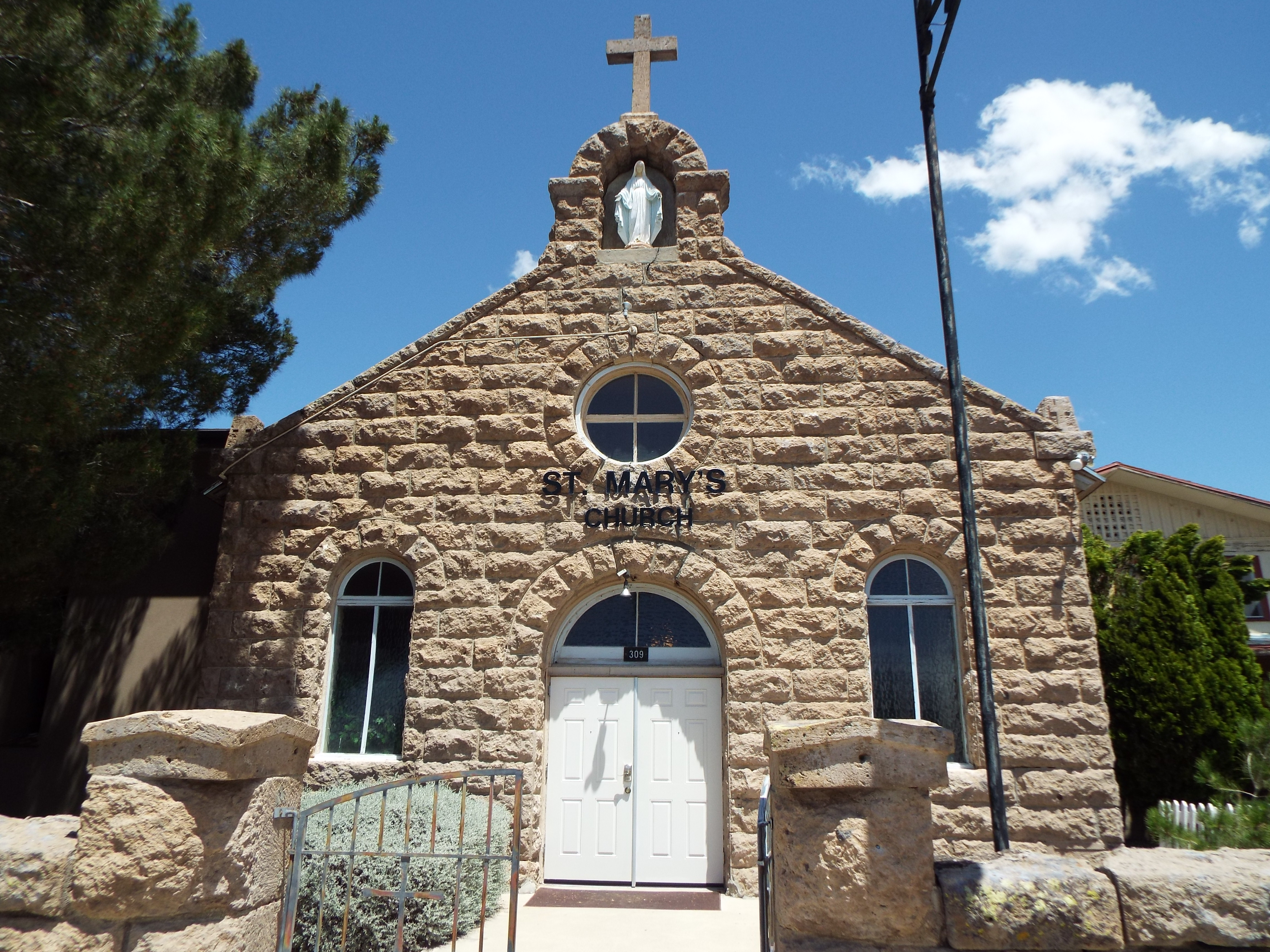
St. Mary's Catholic Church – 1906

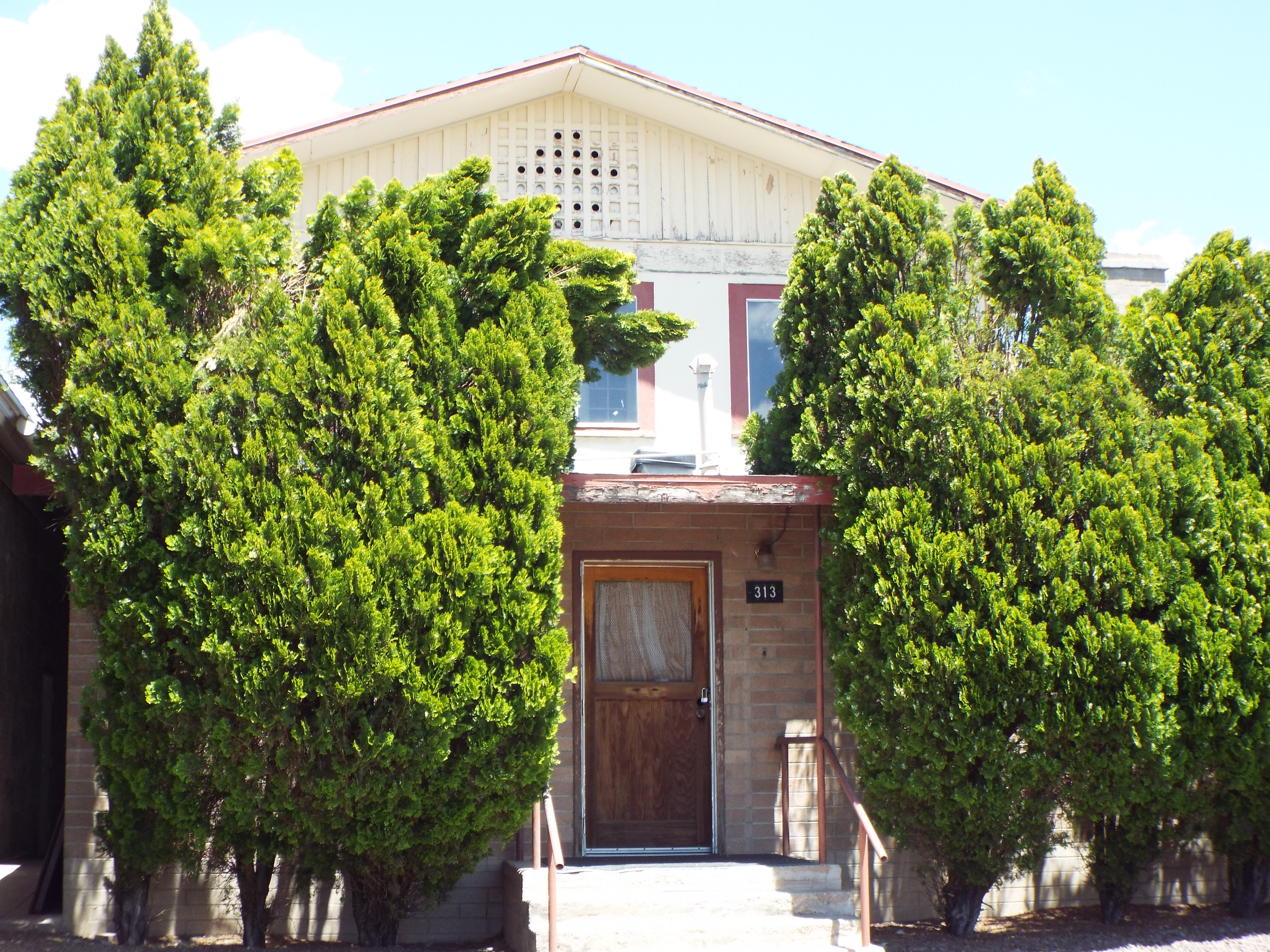
St. Mary's Catholic Church Rectory – 1906

=== Educational institutions ===
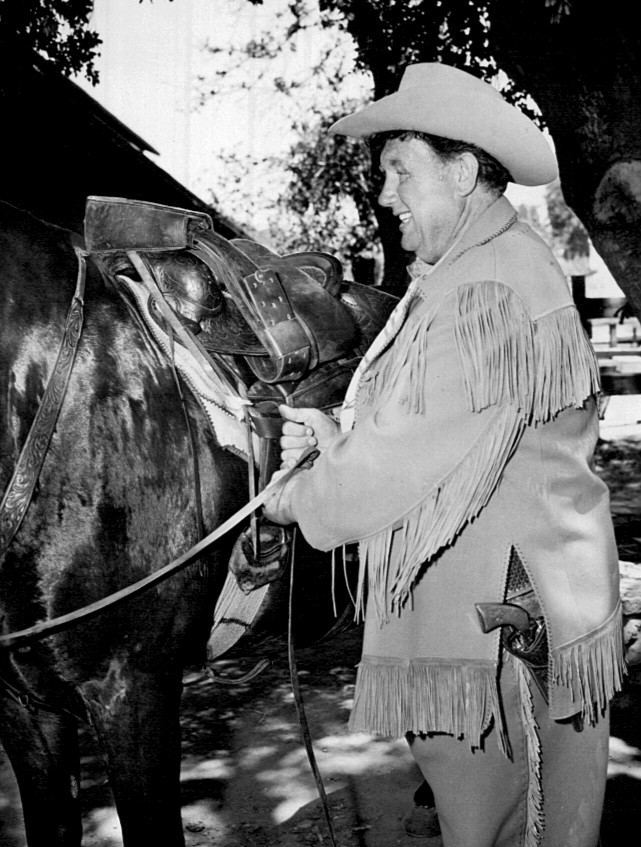
Actor Andy Devine

Among the historical educational institutions in Kingman are the following:

- The Mohave Union High School Gymnasium – built in 1936 and located in 301 1st St. It is the only structure in Kingman to use buttresses. The gym also has Kingman's only lamella roof, which is described as "an unusual method of construction in Arizona". It was listed in the National Register of Historic Places on May 14, 1986, reference: #86001142.
- The Little Red Schoolhouse – built in 1896 and located at 219 N. 4th St. Actor Andy Devine was an alumnus of the school. It was listed in the National Register of Historic Places on May 14, 1986, reference: #86001156.
- Palo Christi School – built in 1928 and located 500 Maple Street. The school was listed in the National Register of Historic Places, under "Kingman Grammar School" the original name of the school, on May 14, 1986, reference: #86001154.
Educational institutions

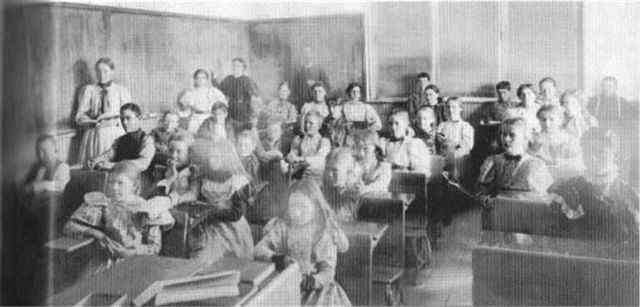
Students inside the Little Red School c.1900

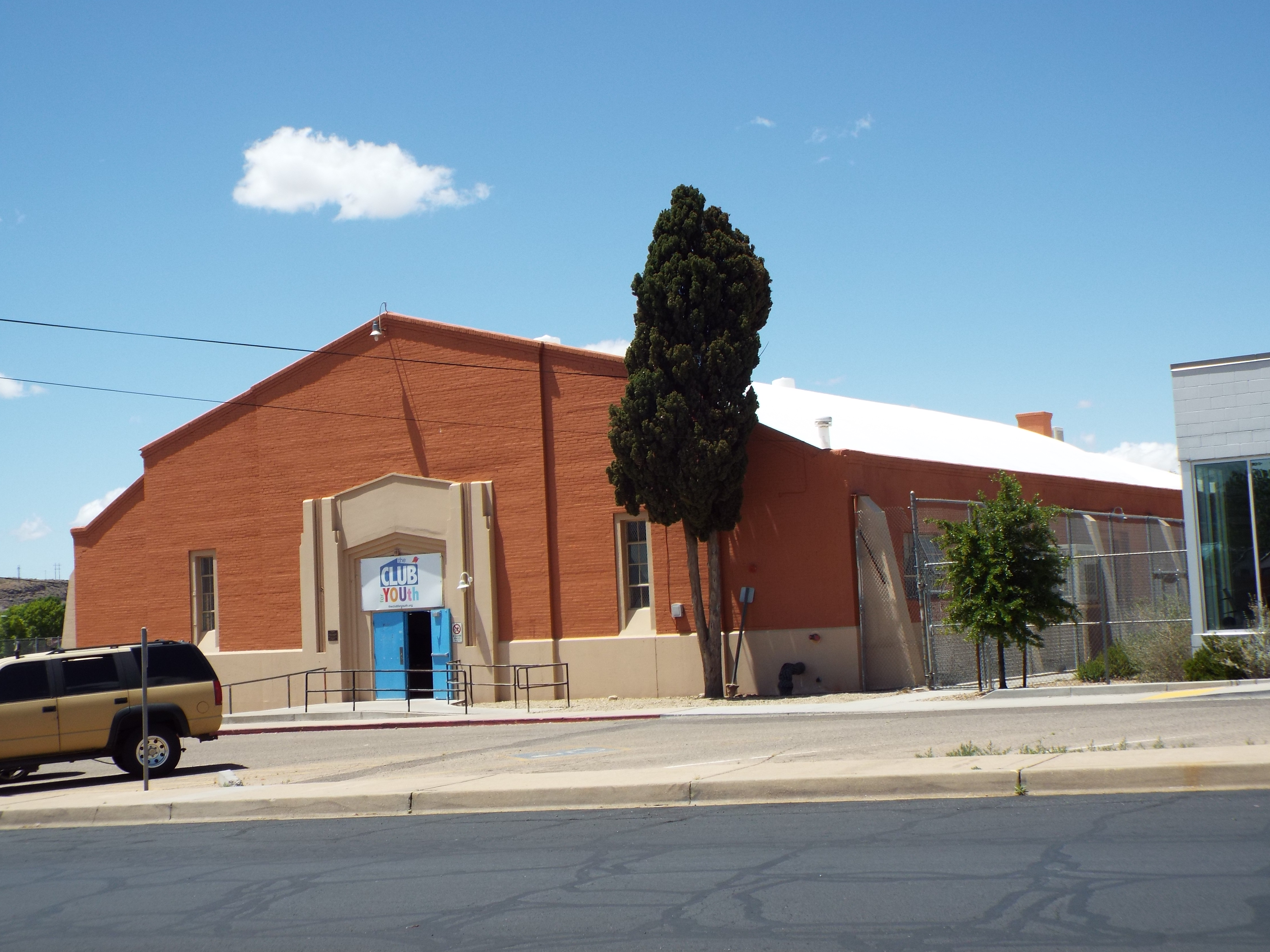
The Mohave Union High School Gymnasium – 1936

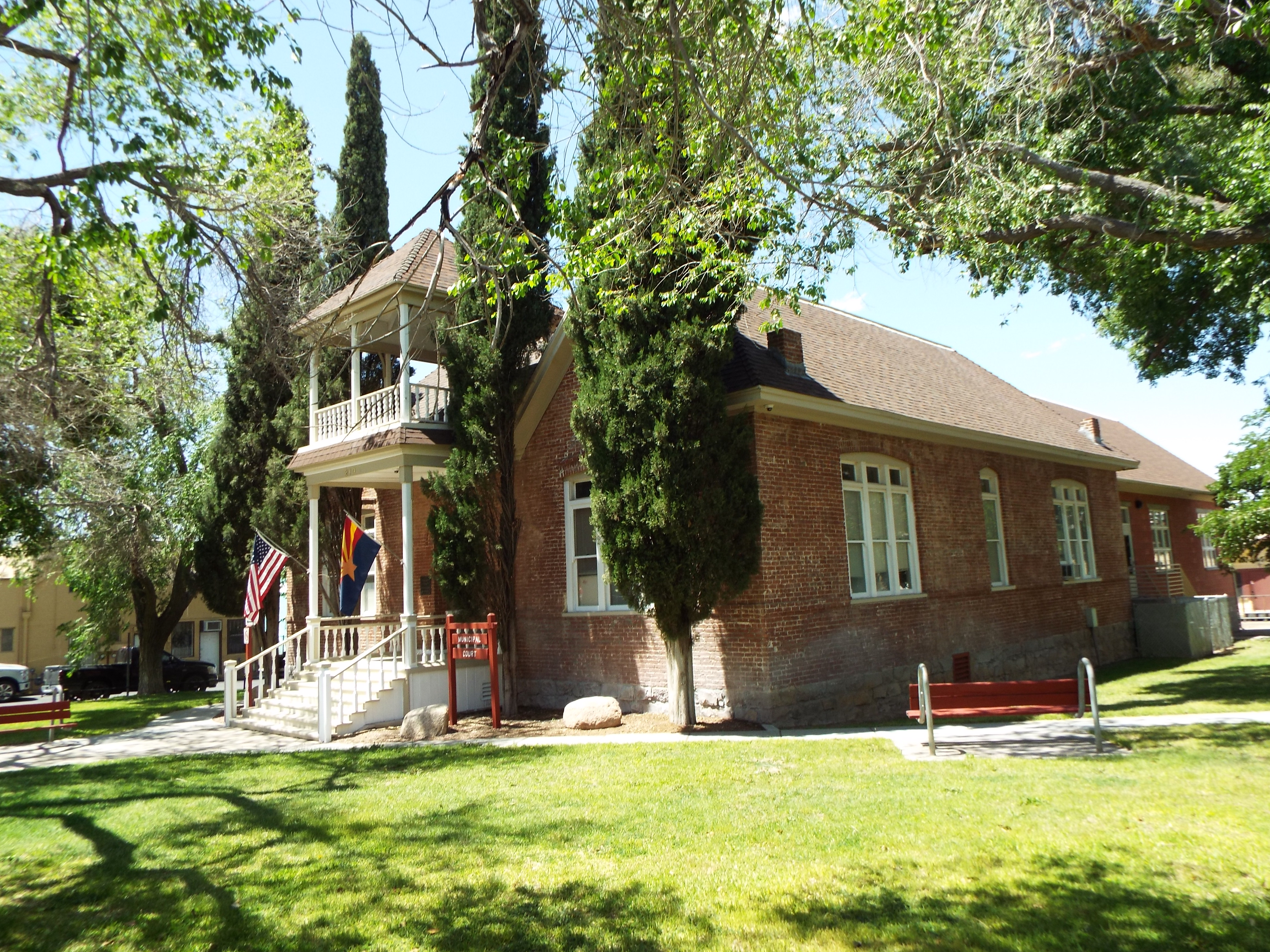
Little Red Schoolhouse-1896

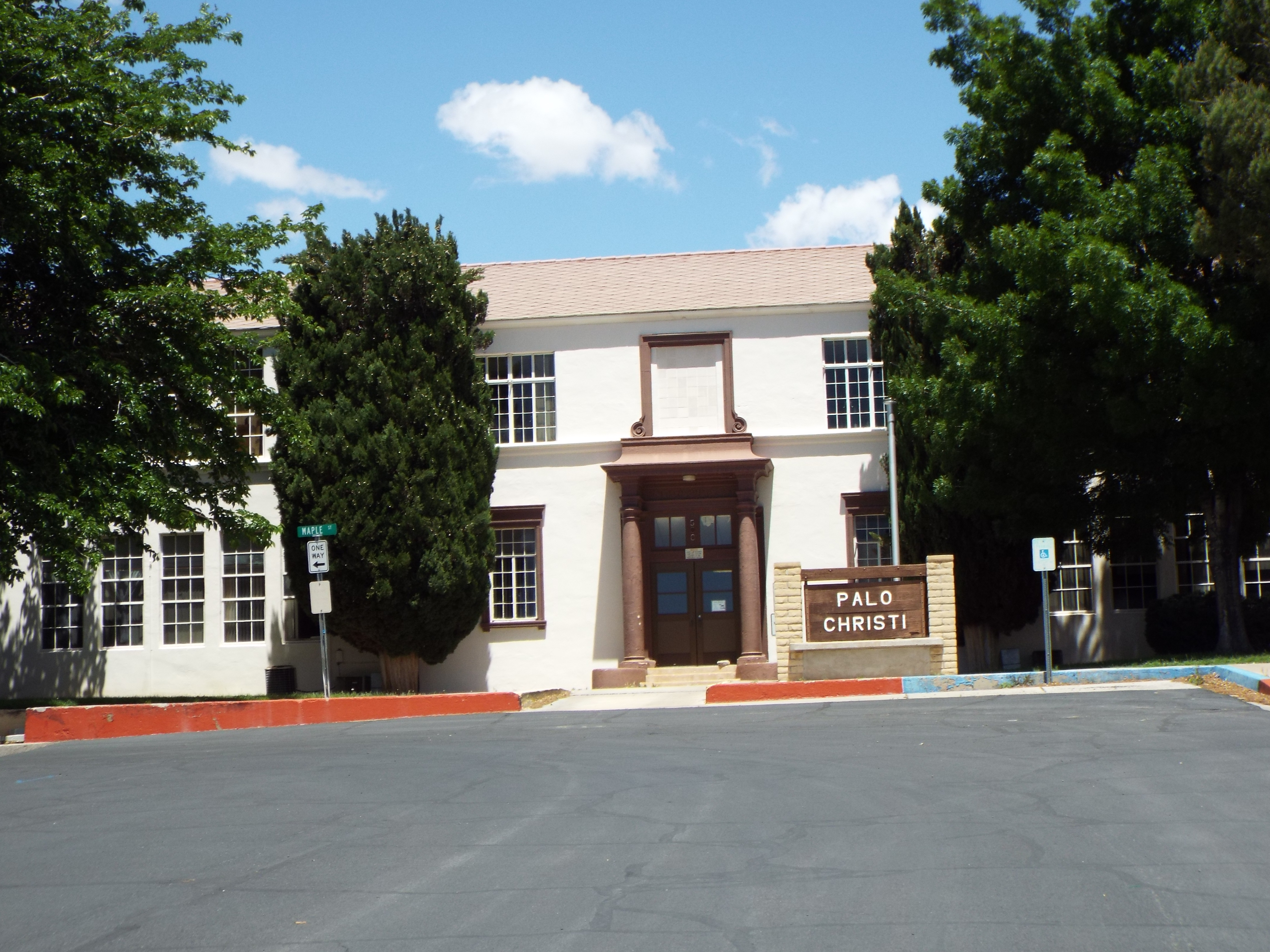
Palo Christi School originally Kingman Grammar School – 1928

=== Houses ===
The following is brief description of the houses in Kingman, many which are listed as historical by the National Register of Historic Places.

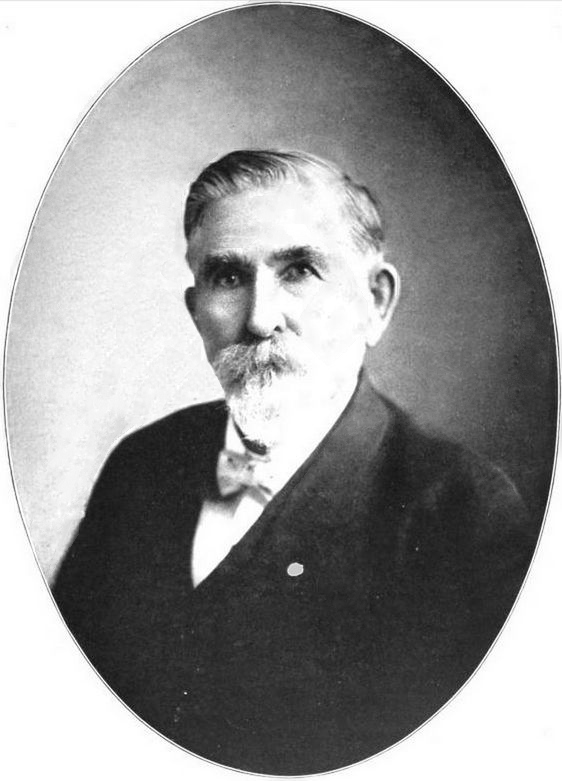
William G. Blakely – preacher and judge

- The House on 202 E. Park St. – built in 1910 and located at 202 E. Park St. Listed in the National Register of Historic Places on May 14, 1986, reference: #86001153
- The Bonelli House – built in 1900 and located at Spring and 5th Sts. Listed in the National Register of Historic Places on April 24, 1975, reference: #75000352
- The Cohenour House – built in 1911 and located at 105 Spring St. Listed in the National Register of Historic Places on May 14, 1986, reference: #86001143.
- The House on 843 E. Andy Divine Ave. – built in 1935 and located at Listed in the National Register of Historic Places on May 14, 1986, reference: #86001153
- The Lefever House – built in 1900 and located at 525 E. Oak St. Listed in the National Register of Historic Places on May 14, 1986, reference: #86001162
- The Mrs. M. P. Sergent House – built in 1897 and located at 426 Topeka Listed in the National Register of Historic Places on May 14, 1986, reference: #86001167
- The R.L. Anderson House – built in 1915 and located at Listed in the National Register of Historic Places on, reference:
- The Ross Blakeley House – built in 1897 and located at 519 E. Spring St. Listed in the National Register of Historic Places on January 7, 1988, reference: #86003763
- The Ross E. Householder House – built in 1916/1923 and located at 431 Spring St Listed in the National Register of Historic Places on May 14, 1986, reference: #86001149
- The S.T. Elliot House – built in 1917 and located at 537 Spring St. Listed in the National Register of Historic Places on May 14, 1986, reference: #86001139
- The Tyrell House – built in 1897 and located at 133 Beale St. Listed in the National Register of Historic Places on May 14, 1986, reference: #86001172
- The W. H. Taggart Home – built in 1883 and located at W.H. Taggart and his associate Orvin Peasley built the Mohave County Courthouse. He was among the first three persons to build a substantial home in Kingman. Listed in the National Register of Historic Places on, reference:
- The William G. Blakeley House – built in 1887 and located at 503 Spring St. Blakeley was a preacher and judge. Listed in the National Register of Historic Places on May 14, 1986, reference: #86001115
- The E. B. Williams House – built in 1887 and located at 531 E. Oak St. Listed in the National Register of Historic Places on May 14, 1986, reference: #86001177
- The Duff Brown house – built in 1911 and located at 524 E. Oak St. Listed in the National Register of Historic Places on May 14, 1986, reference: #86001116
- The Hubbs House – built in 1891 and located at 4th and Golconda Sts. Listed in the National Register of Historic Places on June 15, 1978, reference: #78000554
- The Raymond Carr House – built in 1916 and located at 620 E. Oak St Listed in the National Register of Historic Places on May 14, 1986, reference: #86001118
- The Foster S. Dennis House – built in 1889 and located at 2nd and Park St. Foster S. Dennis was the owner of sampling works plant in Kingman. Listed in the National Register of Historic Places on May 14, 1986, reference: #86001119
- The George R. Kayser House – built in 1898 and located at 604 E. Oak St. Listed in the National Register of Historic Places on May 14, 1986, reference: #86001151
- The House on 809 Grandview – built in 1923 and located at 809 Grandview Ave. Listed in the National Register of Historic Places on May 14, 1986, reference: #86001144
- The House at 527 Pine St. – built in 1917 and located at 527 Pine St. Listed in the National Register of Historic Places on May 14, 1986, reference #86001145.
- The House at 536 East Park St – built in 1906 and located at 536 East Park St. Listed in the National Register of Historic Places on May 14, 1986, reference: #86001146
- The W. P. Mahoney House – built in 1919/1923 and located at 155 E. Walnut Listed in the National Register of Historic Places on May 14, 1986, reference: #86001163
- The Dr. Toler White House – built in 1916 and located at 509 Spring Street. Listed in the National Register of Historic Places on, reference: #86001178
- The J. B. Wright House – built in 1912 and located at 317 Spring St. Listed in the National Register of Historic Places on May 14, 1986, reference: #86001178
- The Max J. Anderson House – built in 1927 and located at 703 E. Beale St. The house was built of native stone. Listed in the National Register of Historic Places on May 28, 1987, reference: #87001160.

Historic houses not pictured:

- The Arthur F. Black House – built in 1925 and located at 707 Cerbat Ave. Listed in the National Register of Historic Places on December 9, 1993, reference: #93001324
- The J. M. Gates House – built in 1915 and located at 714 E. Oak St. Listed in the National Register of Historic Places on May 14, 1986, reference: #86001140
- The House at 519 Golconda – built in 1897 and located at 519 Golconda Street. Listed in the National Register of Historic Places on May 14, 1986, reference: #86001148
- The Dr. David S. Livingston House– built in 1889 and located at 222 Topeka St. Listed in the National Register of Historic Places on May 14, 1986, reference: #86001158
- The O. E. Walker House – built in 1916 and located at 906 Madison St. Listed in the National Register of Historic Places on May 14, 1986, reference: #86001175
Historic houses
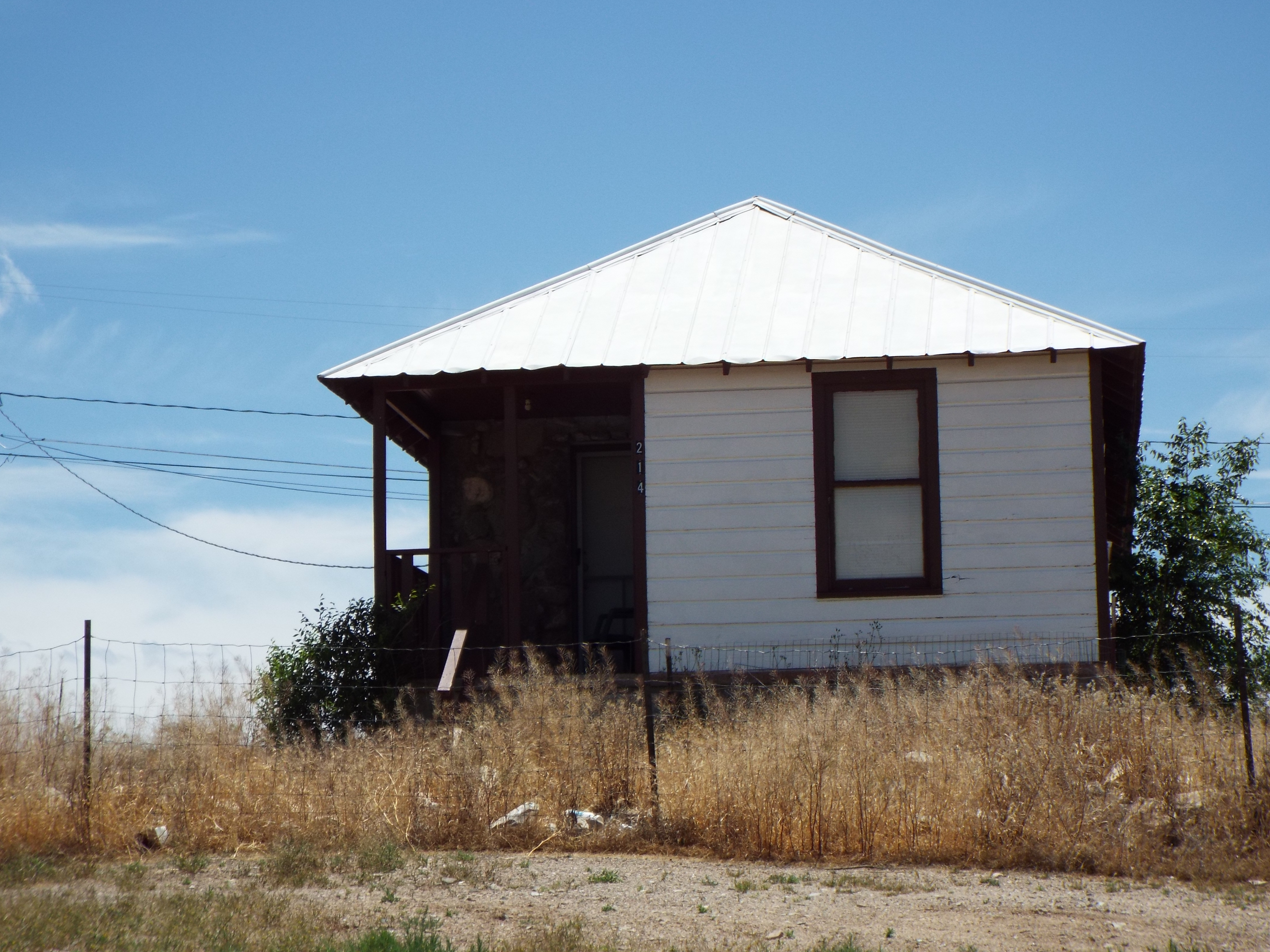
House on 202 E. Park St – 1910

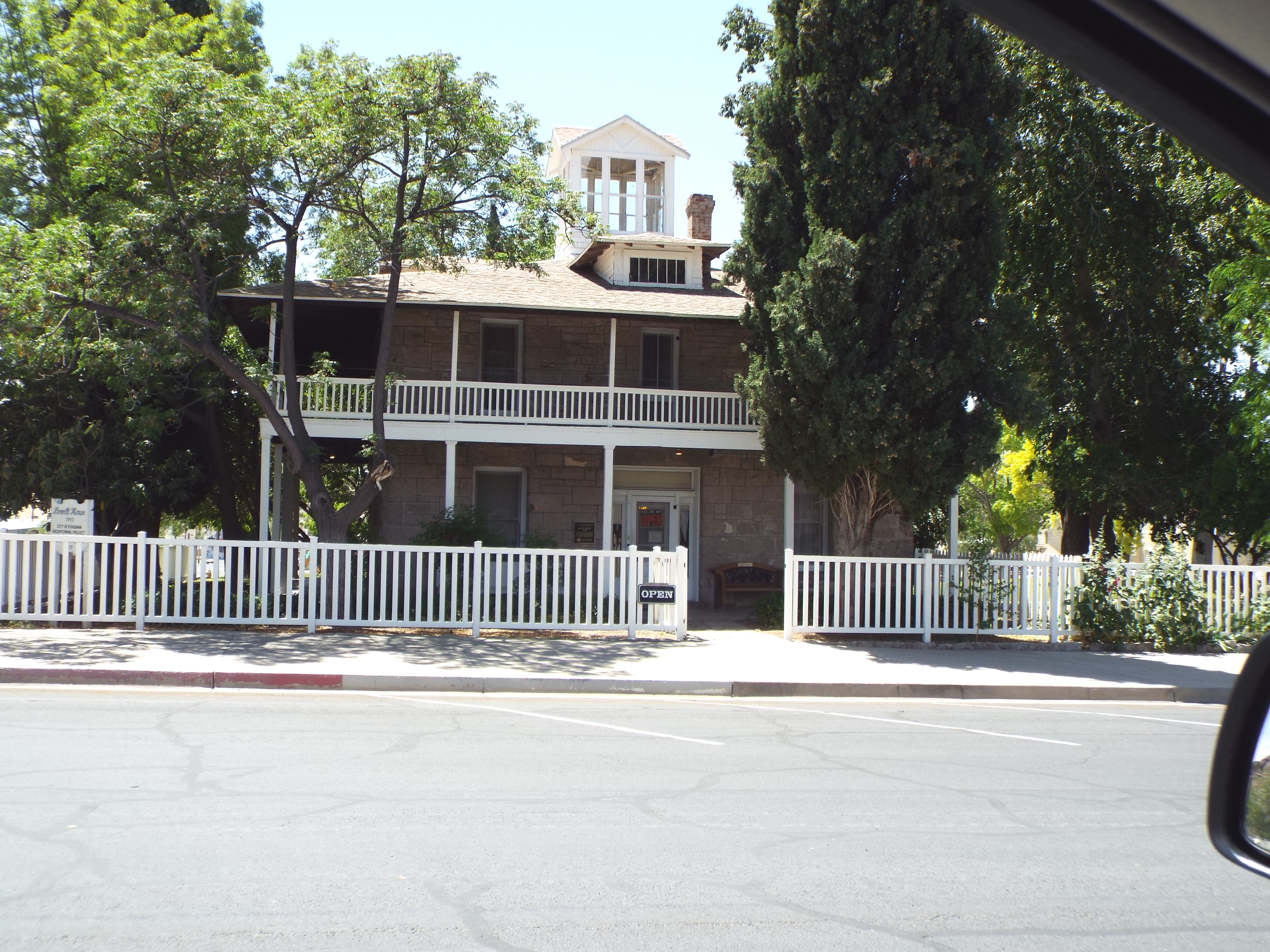
Bonelli House – 1900

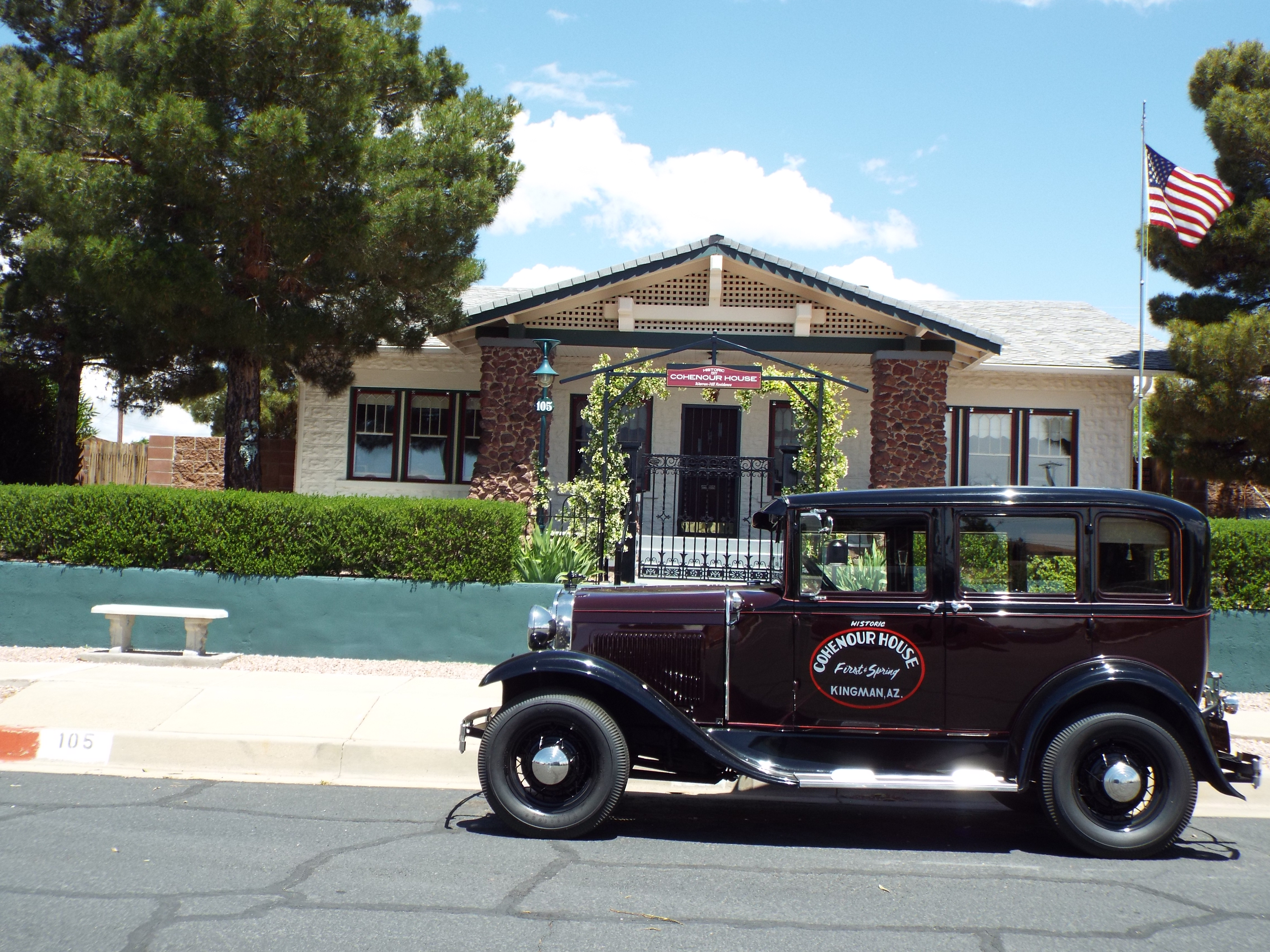
Cohenour House – 1911

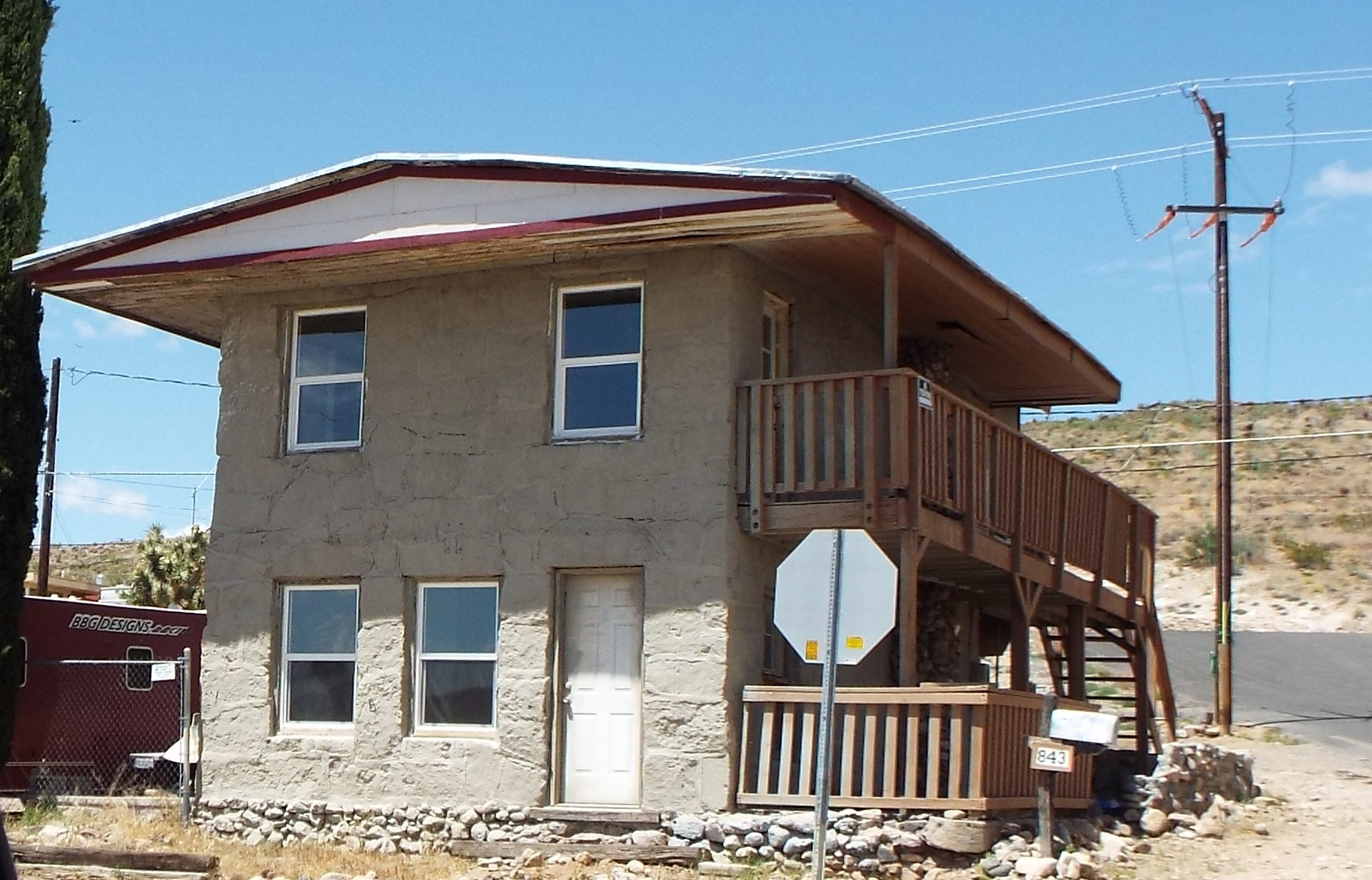
House on 843 E. Andy Divine Ave. – 1935

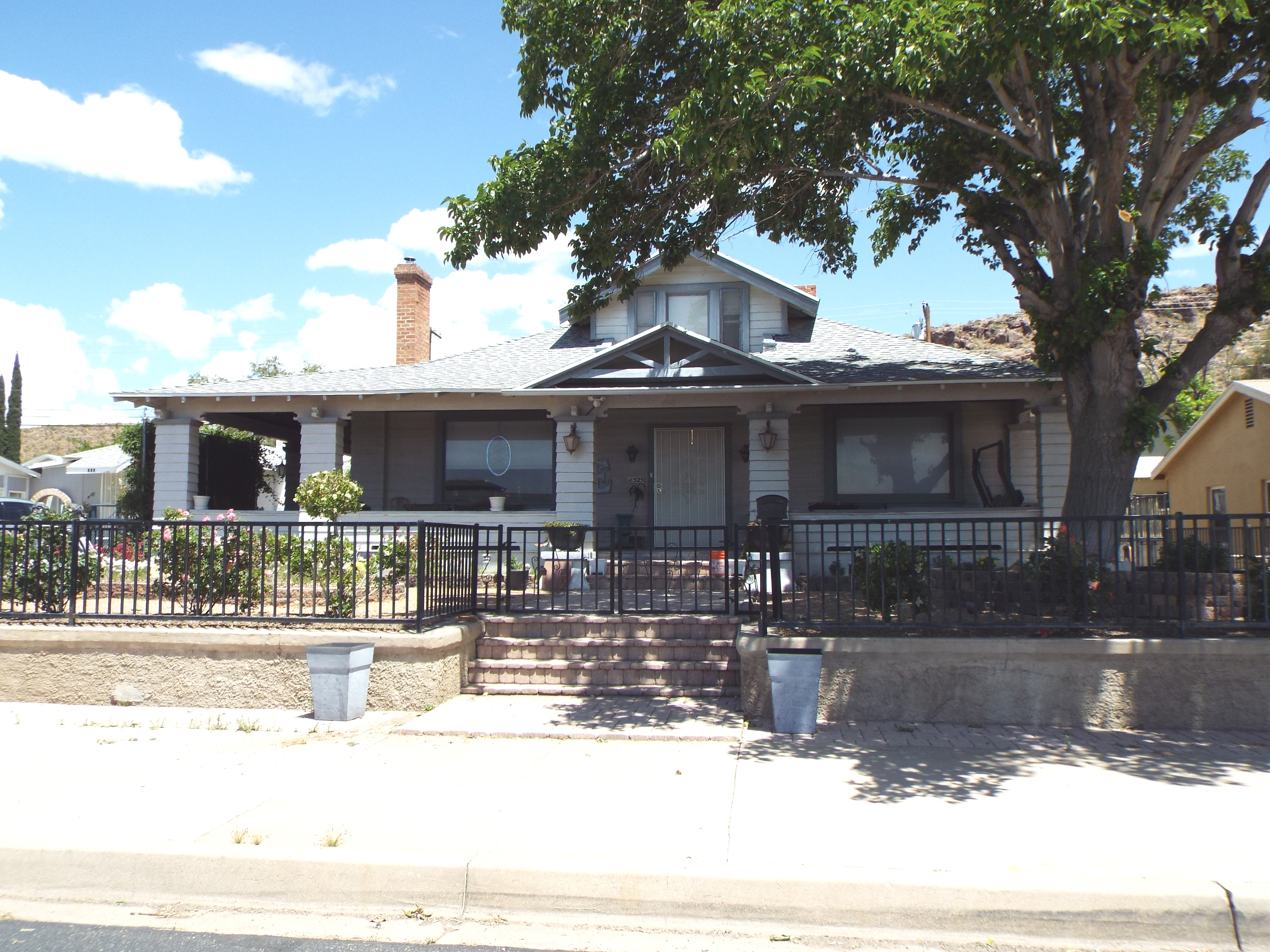
Lefever House – 1900

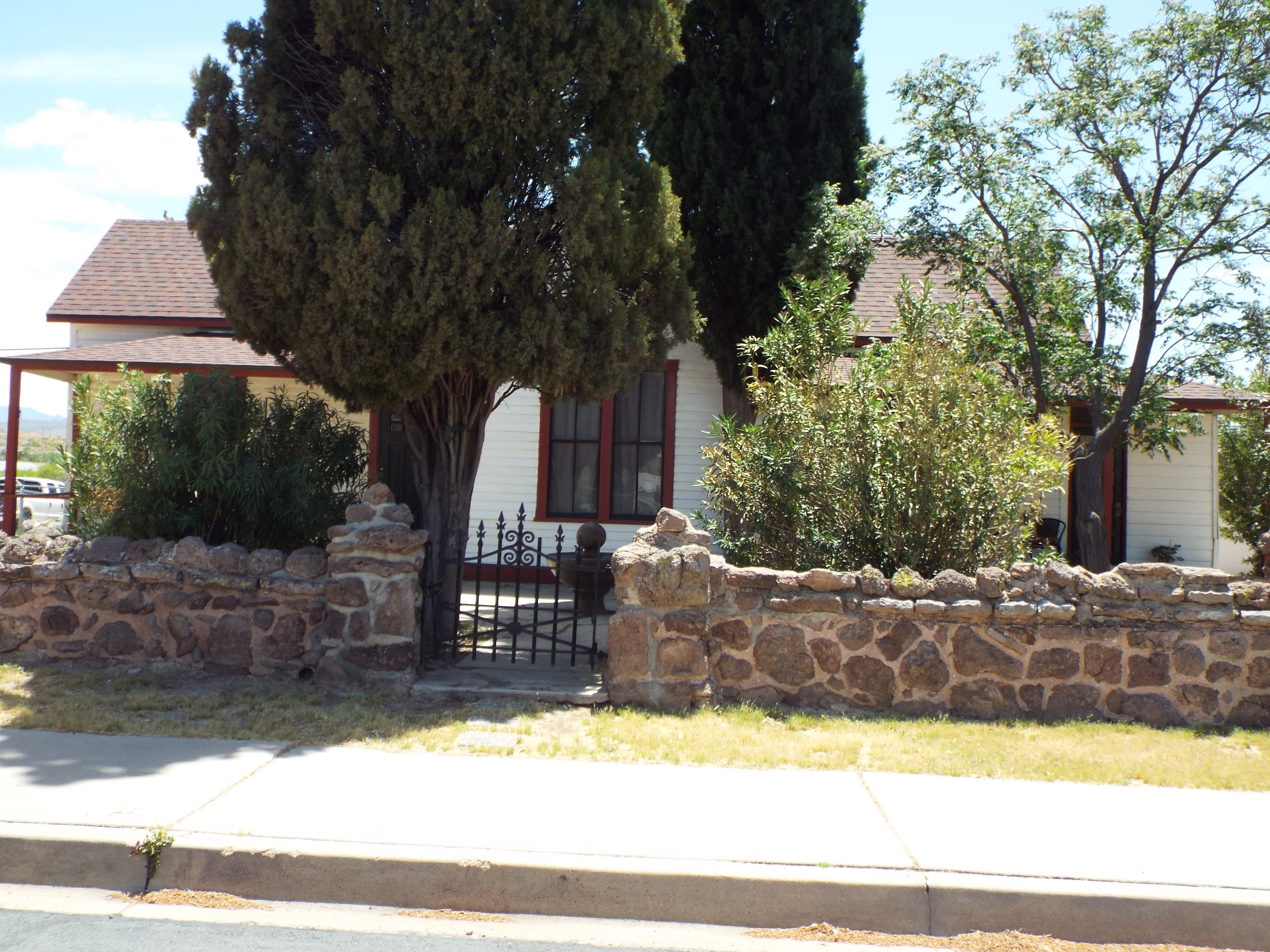
Mrs. M. P. Sergent House-1897

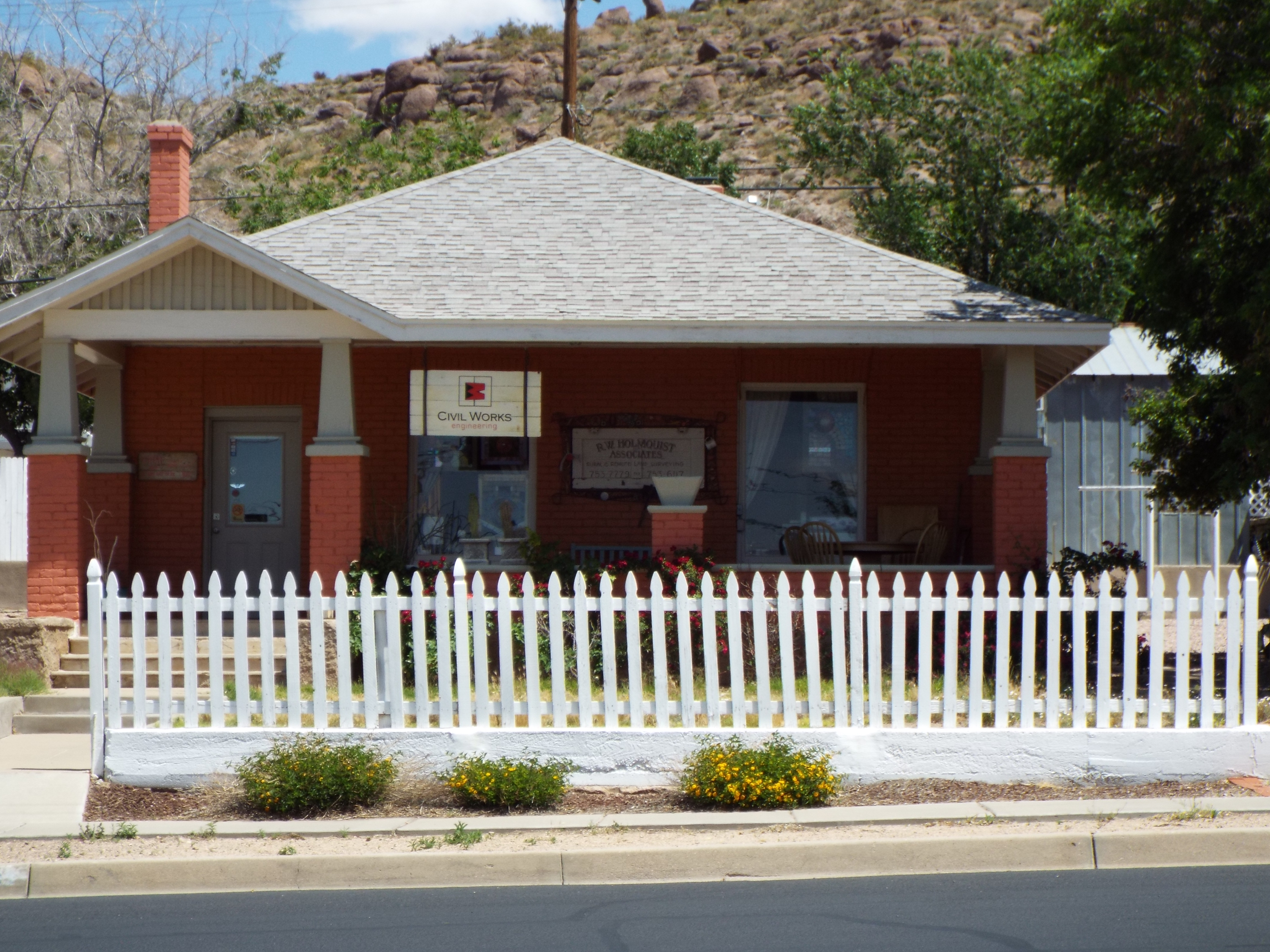
R.L. Anderson House – 1915

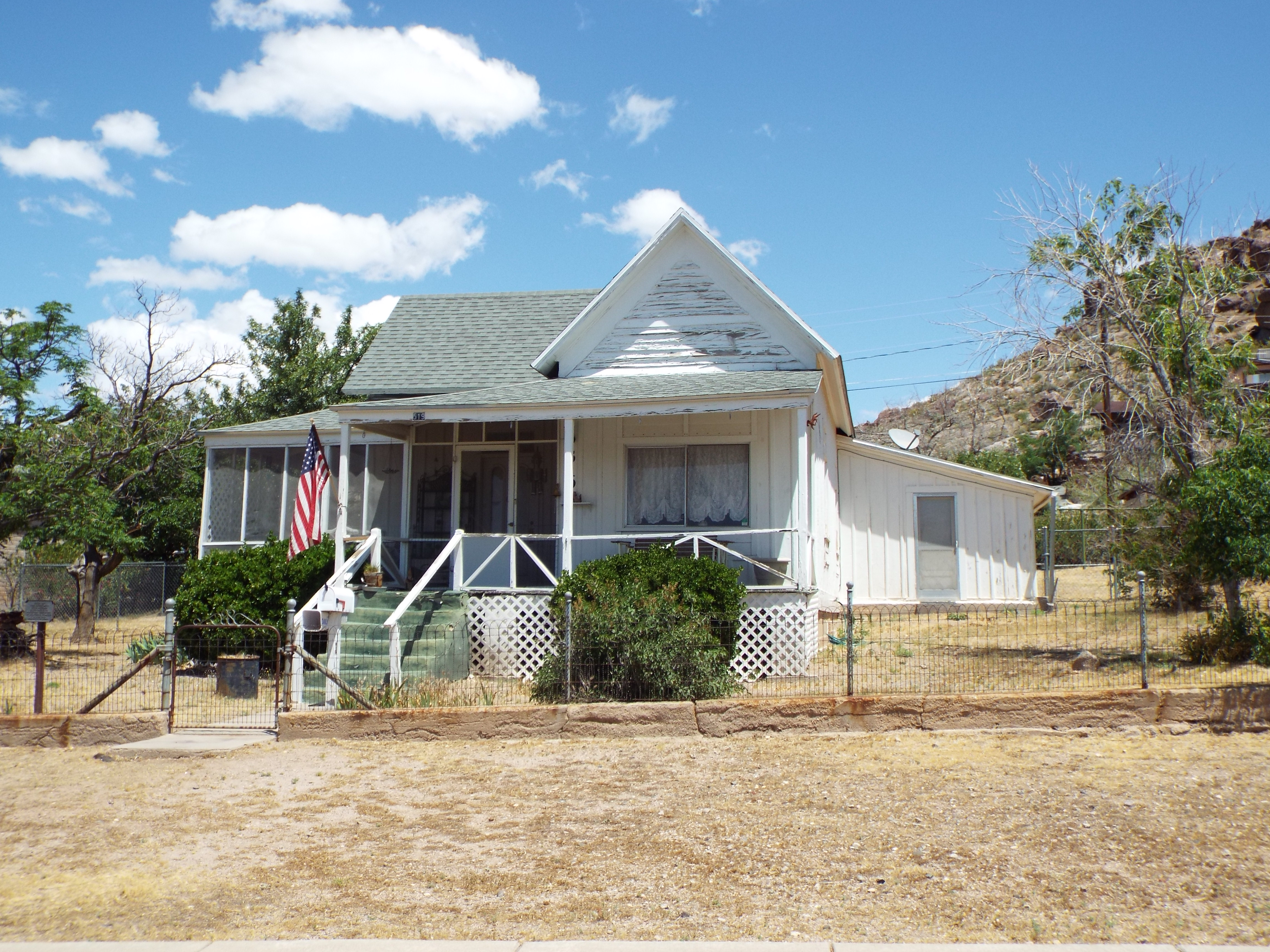
Ross Blakeley House – 1897

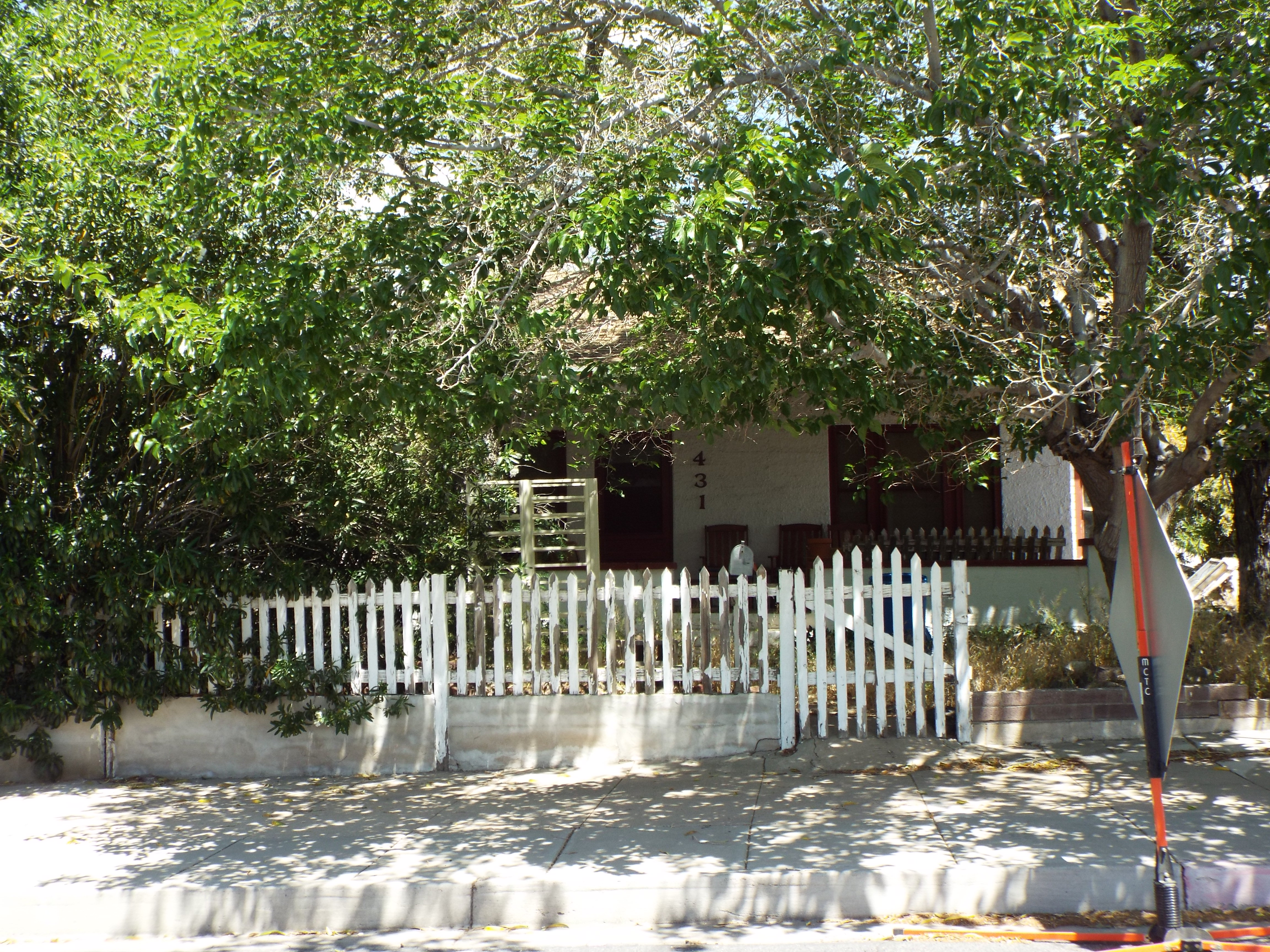
Ross E. Householder House – 1916/1923

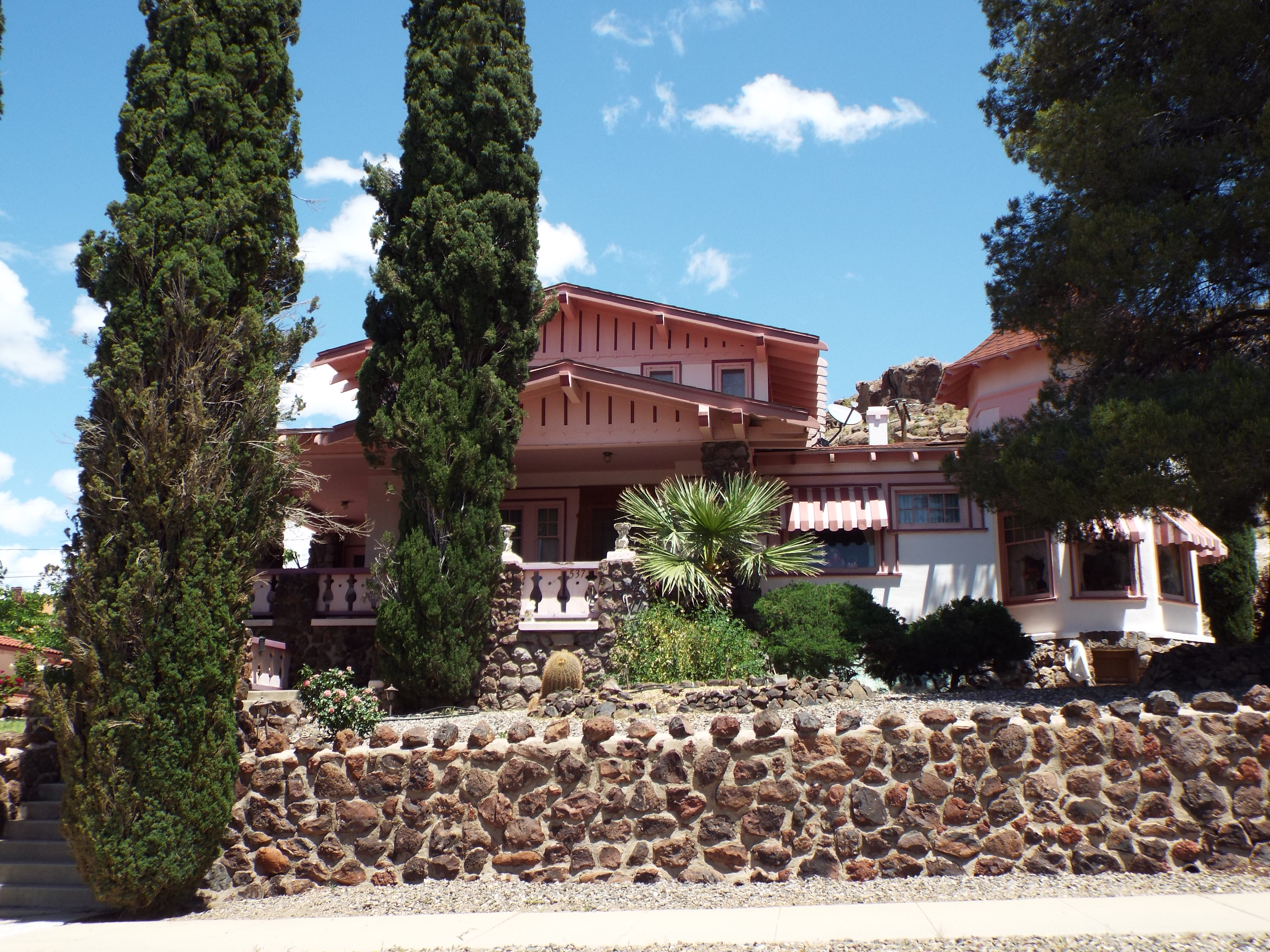
S.T. Elliot House – 1917

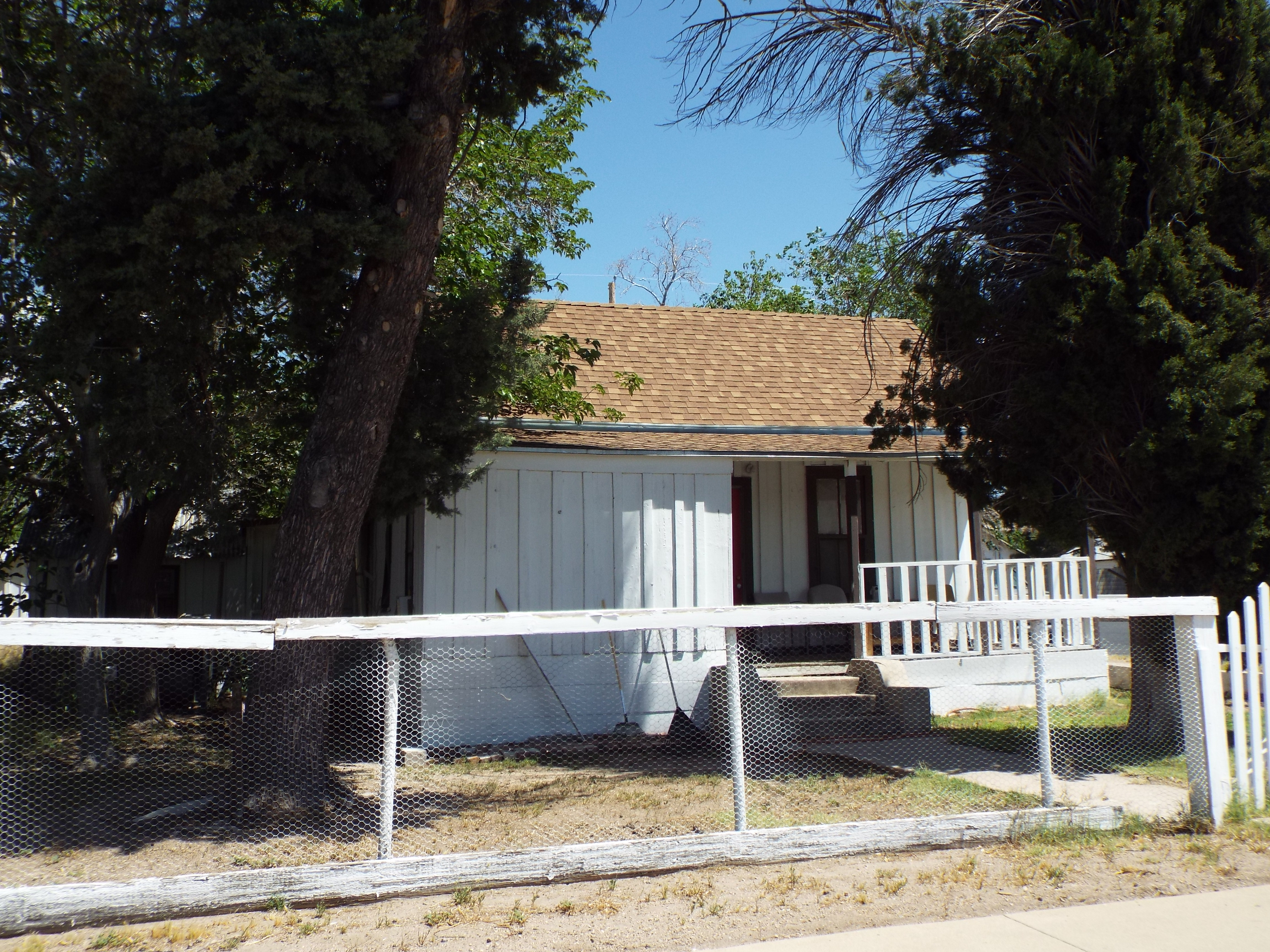
Tyrell House-1897

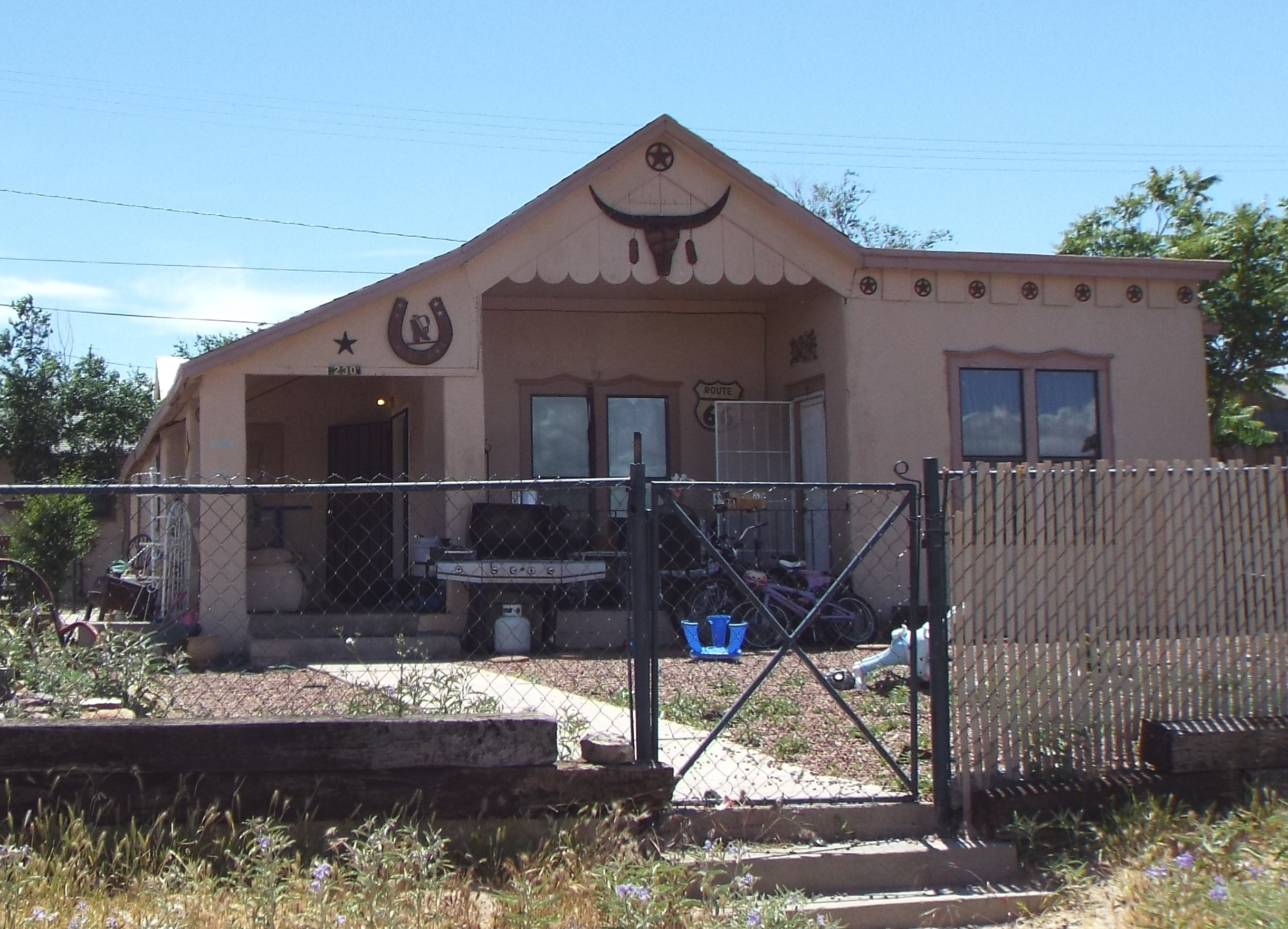
W. H. Taggart Home-1883

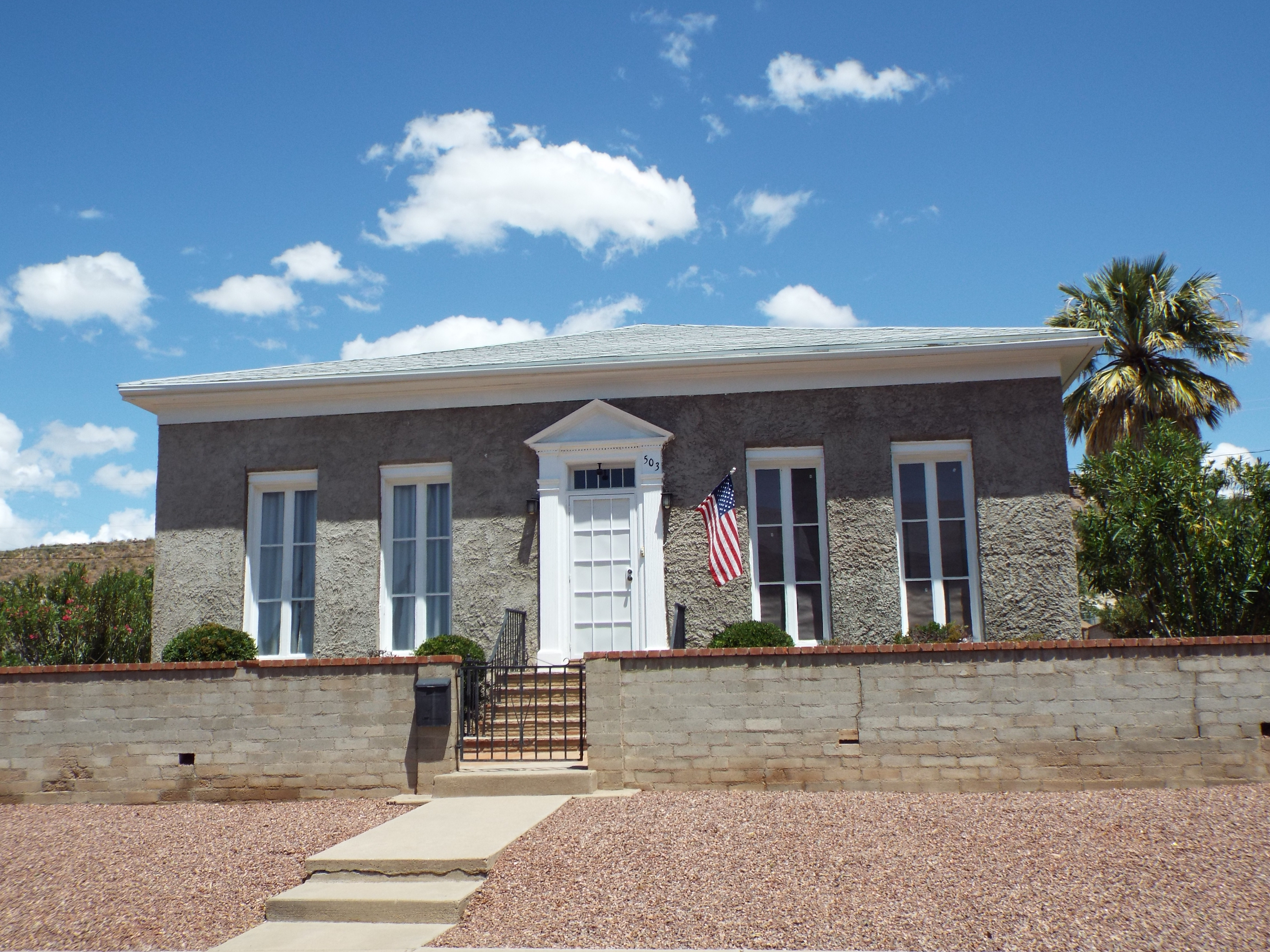
William G. Blakeley House-1887

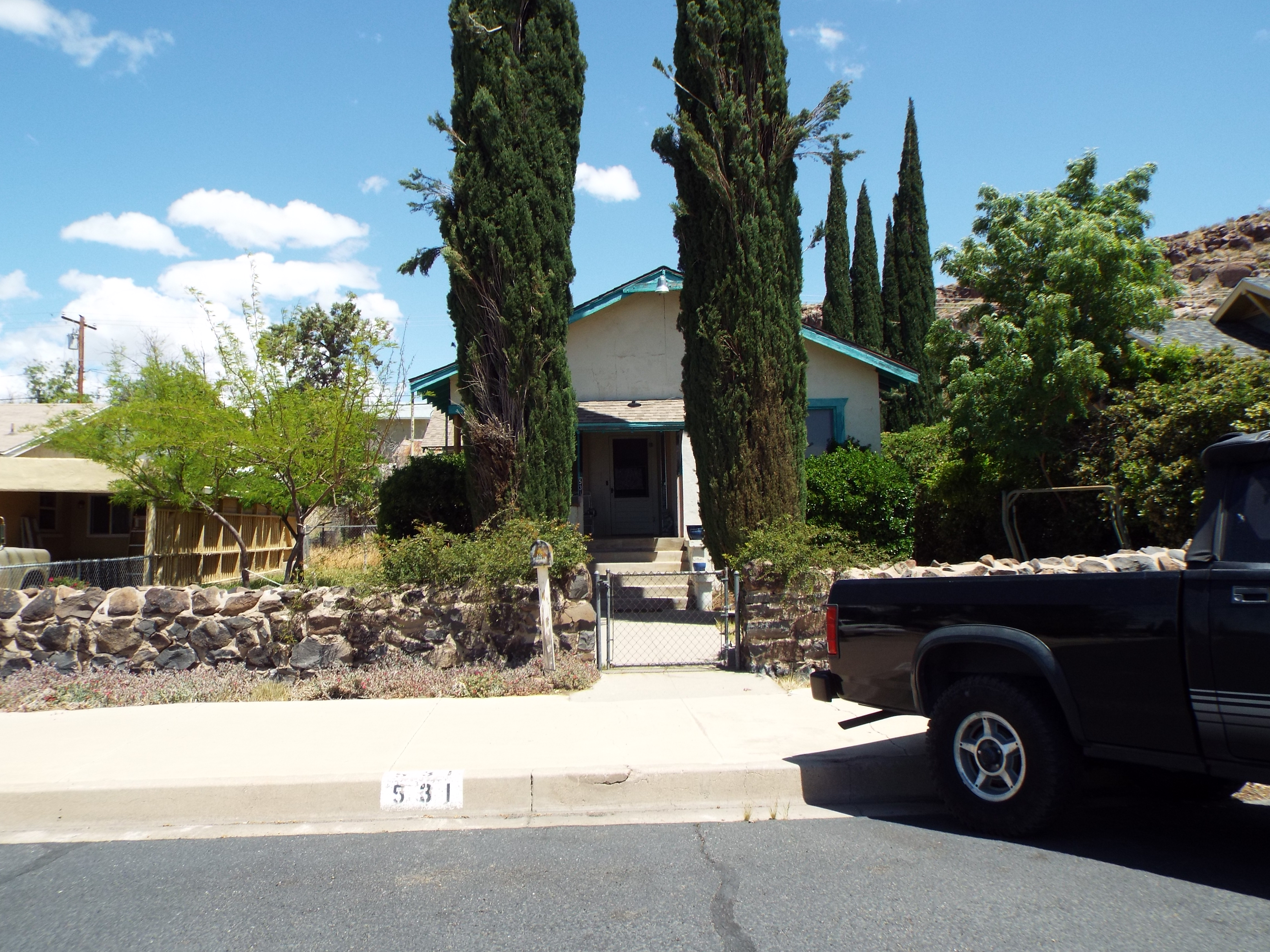
E.B. Williams House-1887

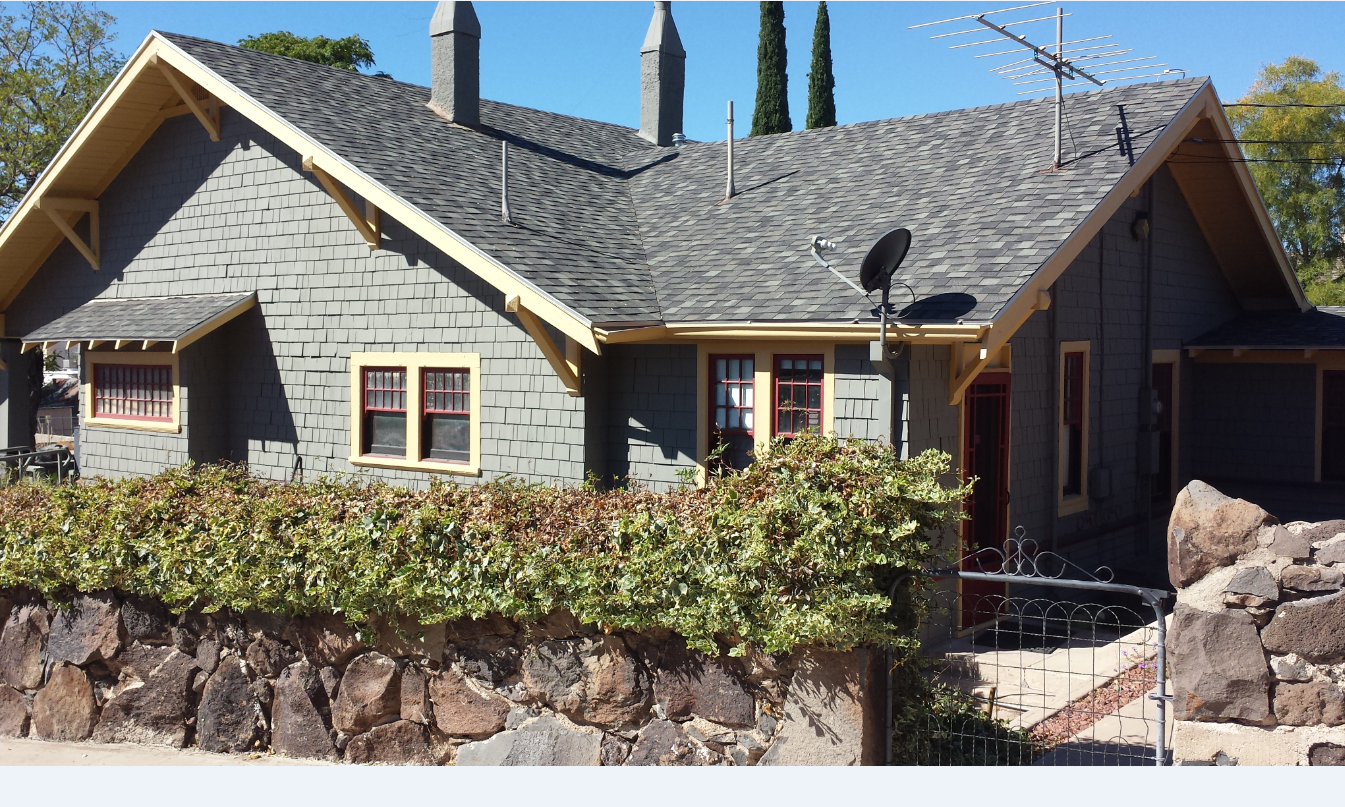
Duff Brown house – 1911

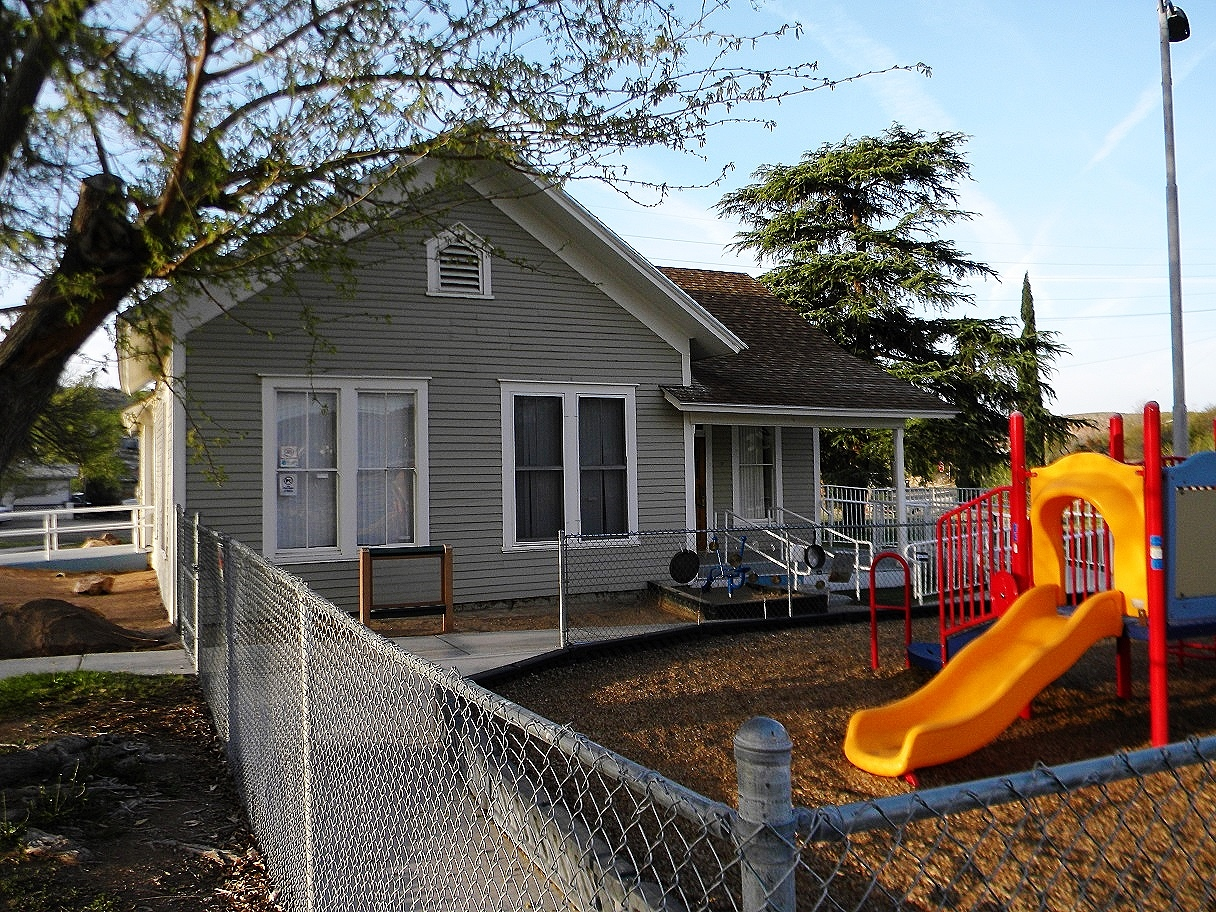
Hubbs House – 1891

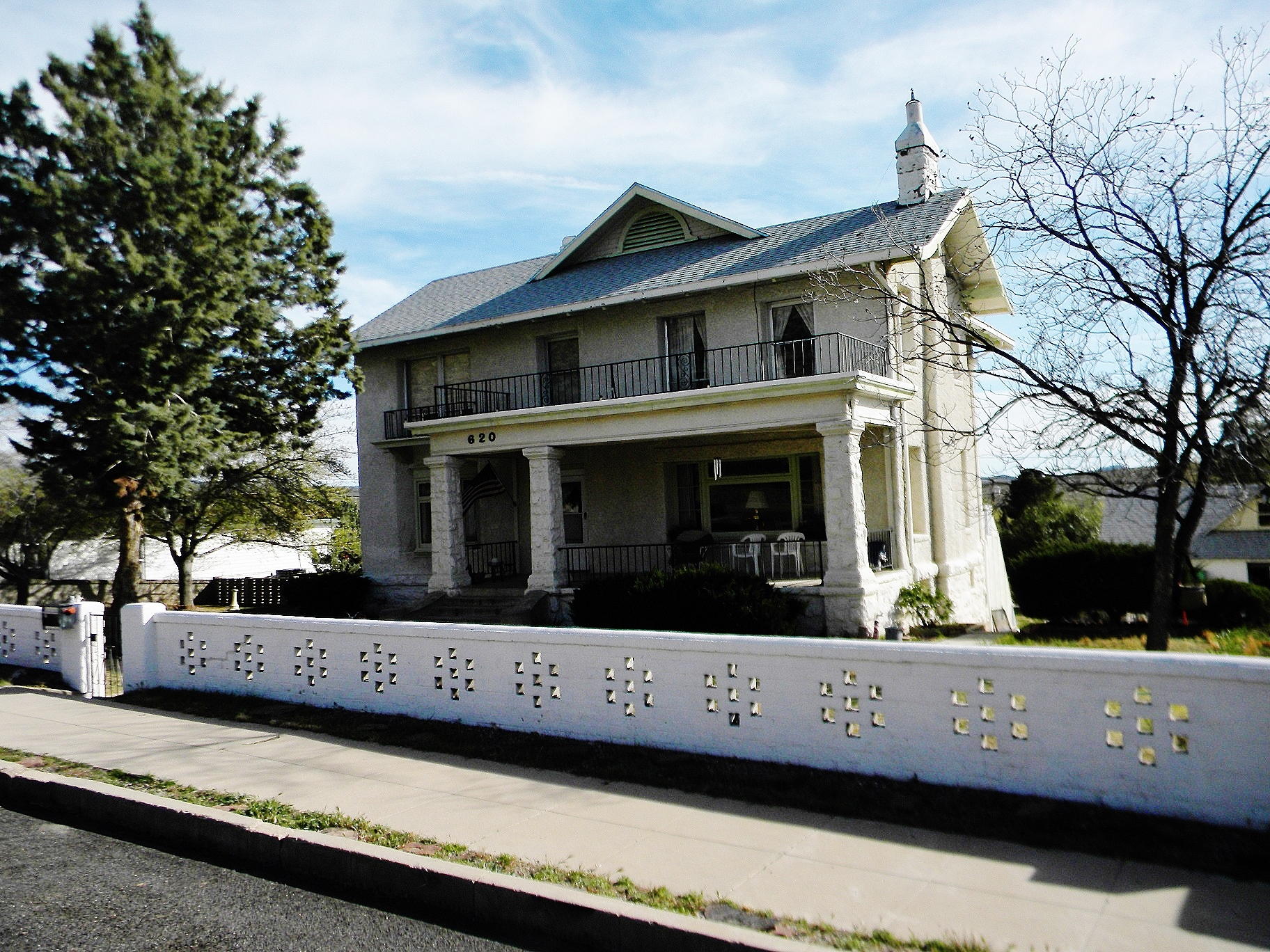
Raymond Carr House – 1916

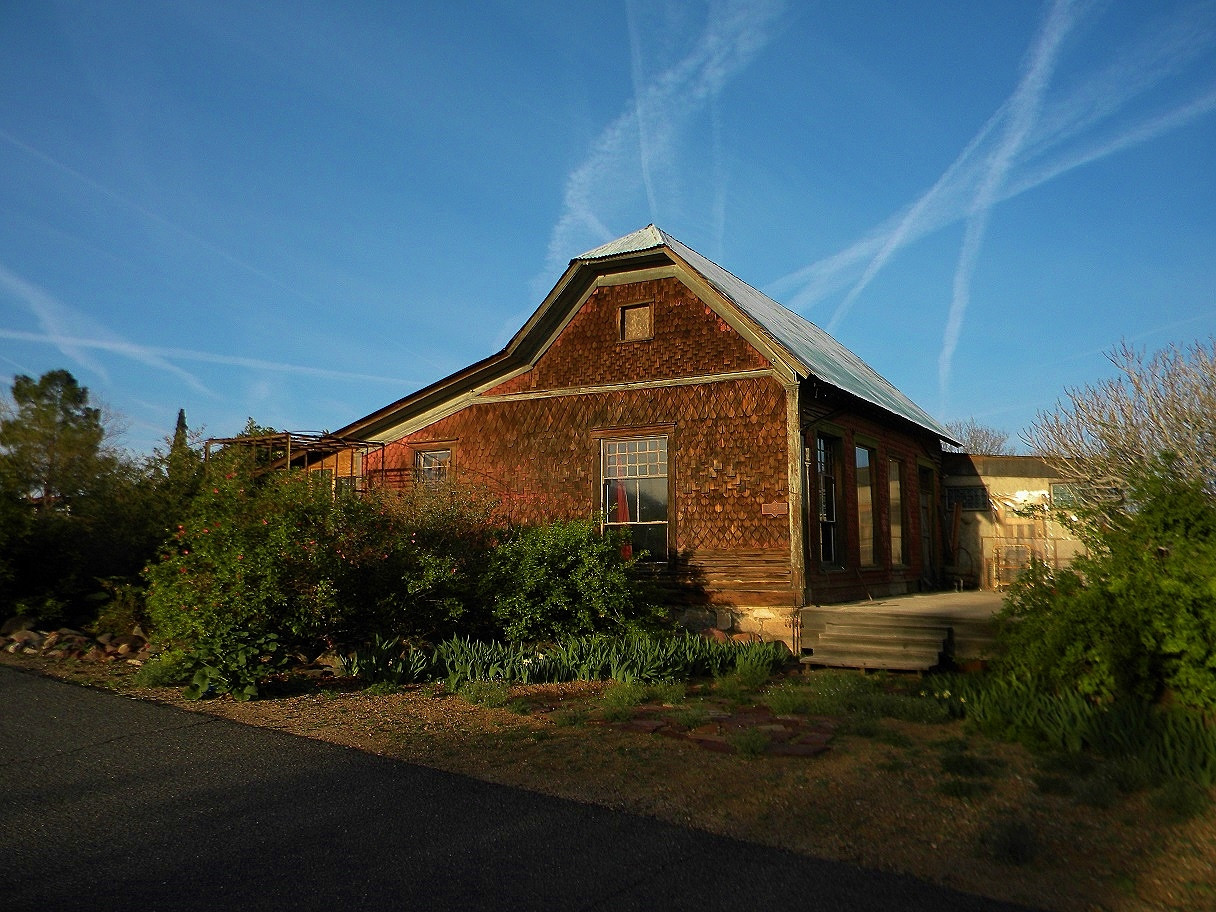
Foster S. Dennis House – 1889

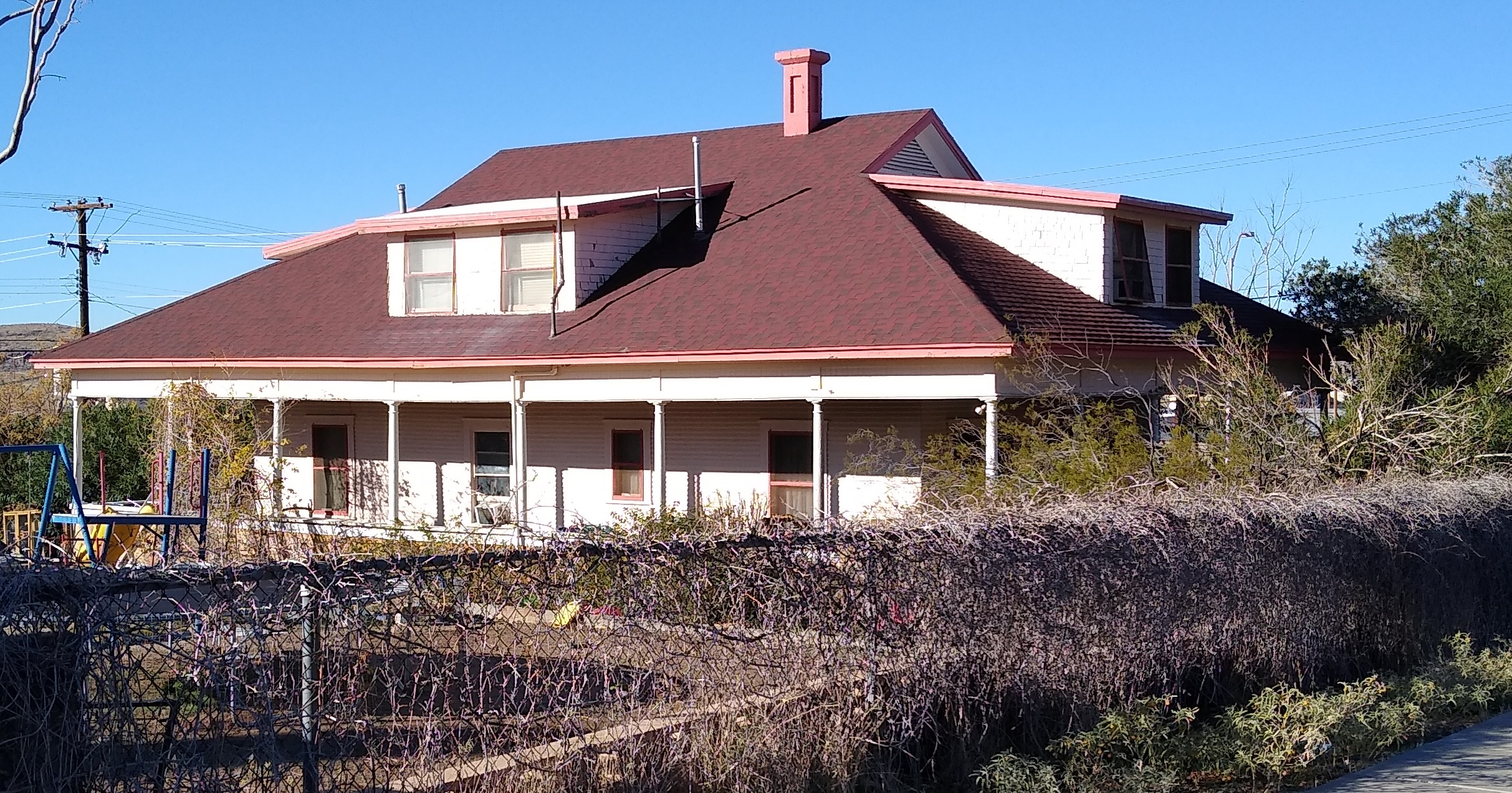
George R. Kayser House – 1911

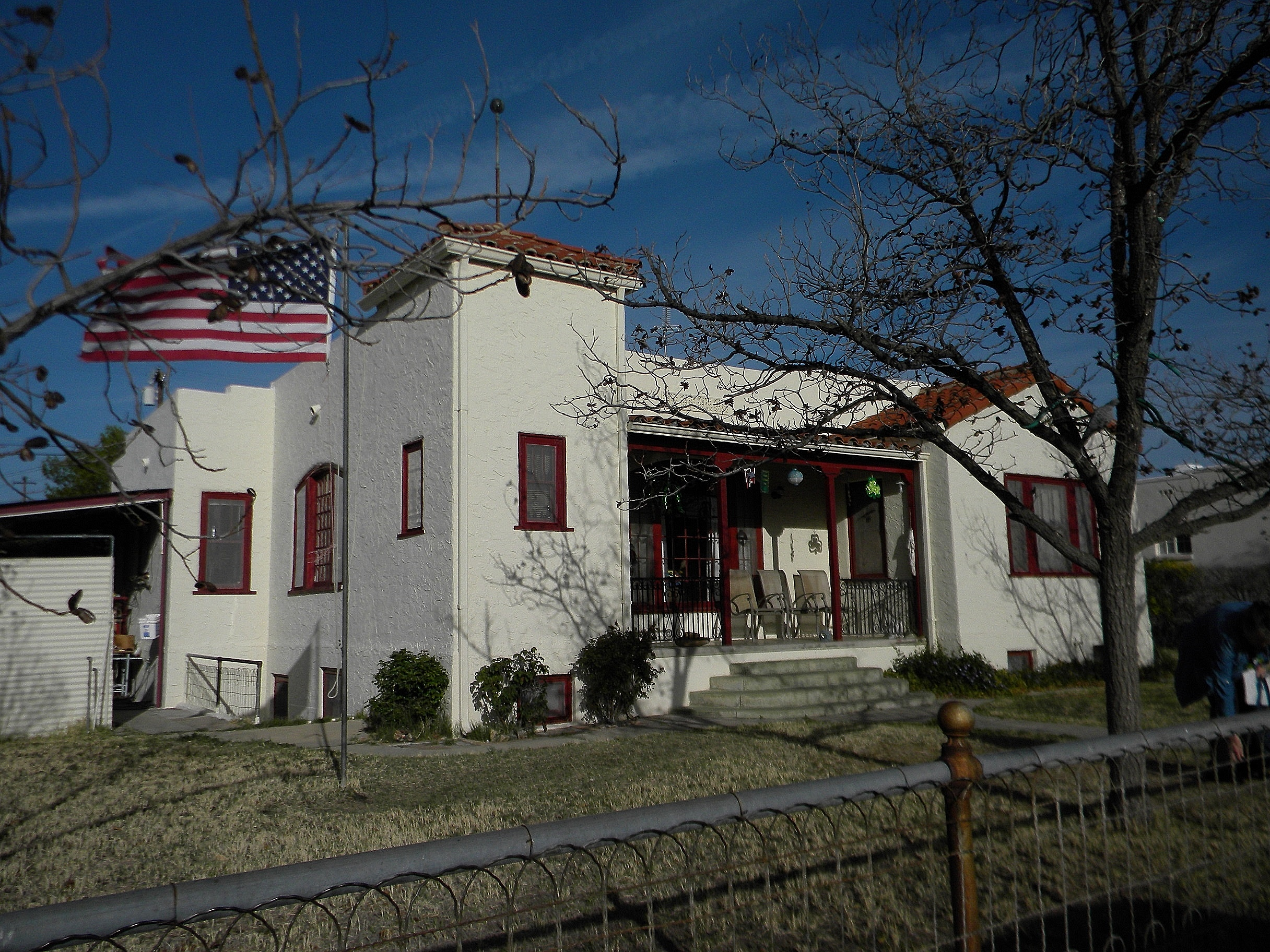
House on 809 Grandview – 1923

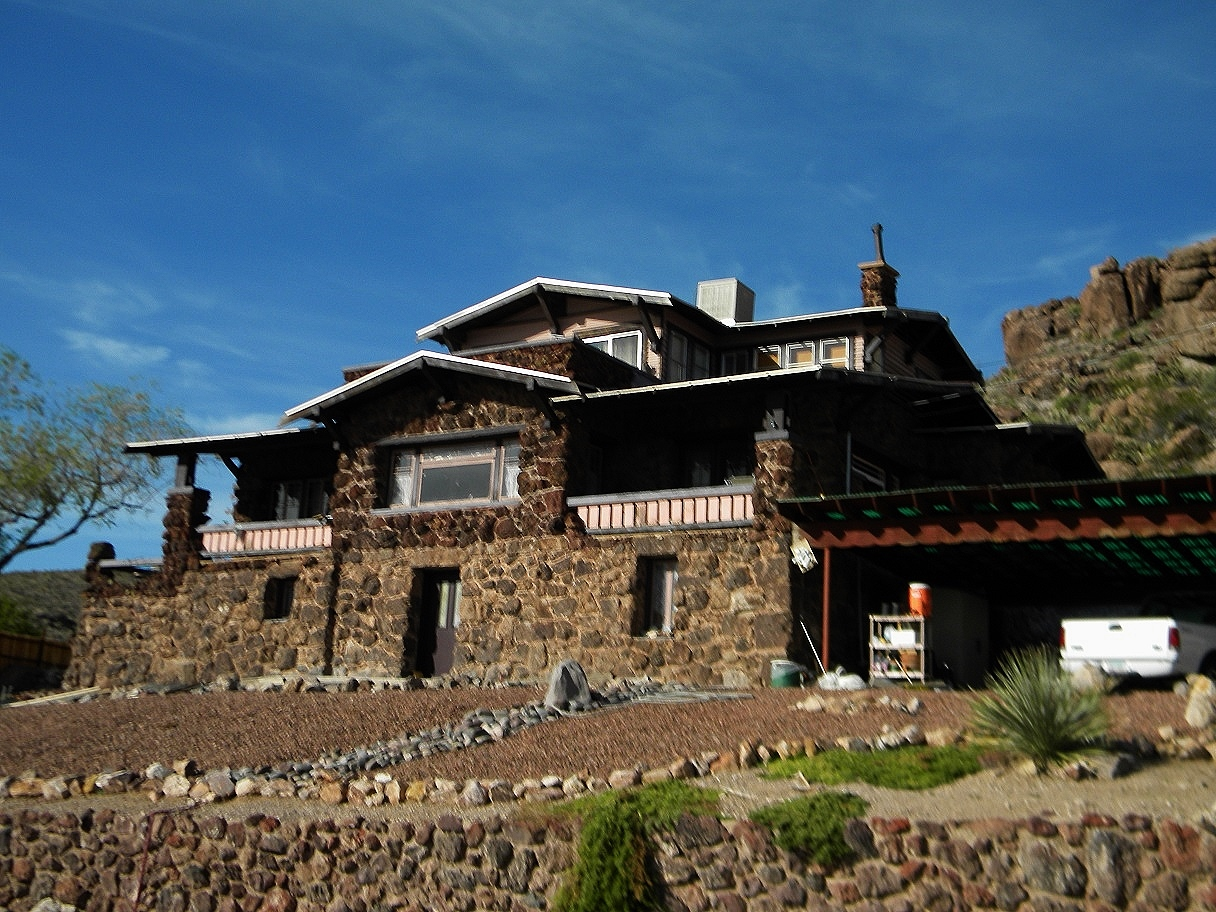
House at 527 Pine St. – 1917

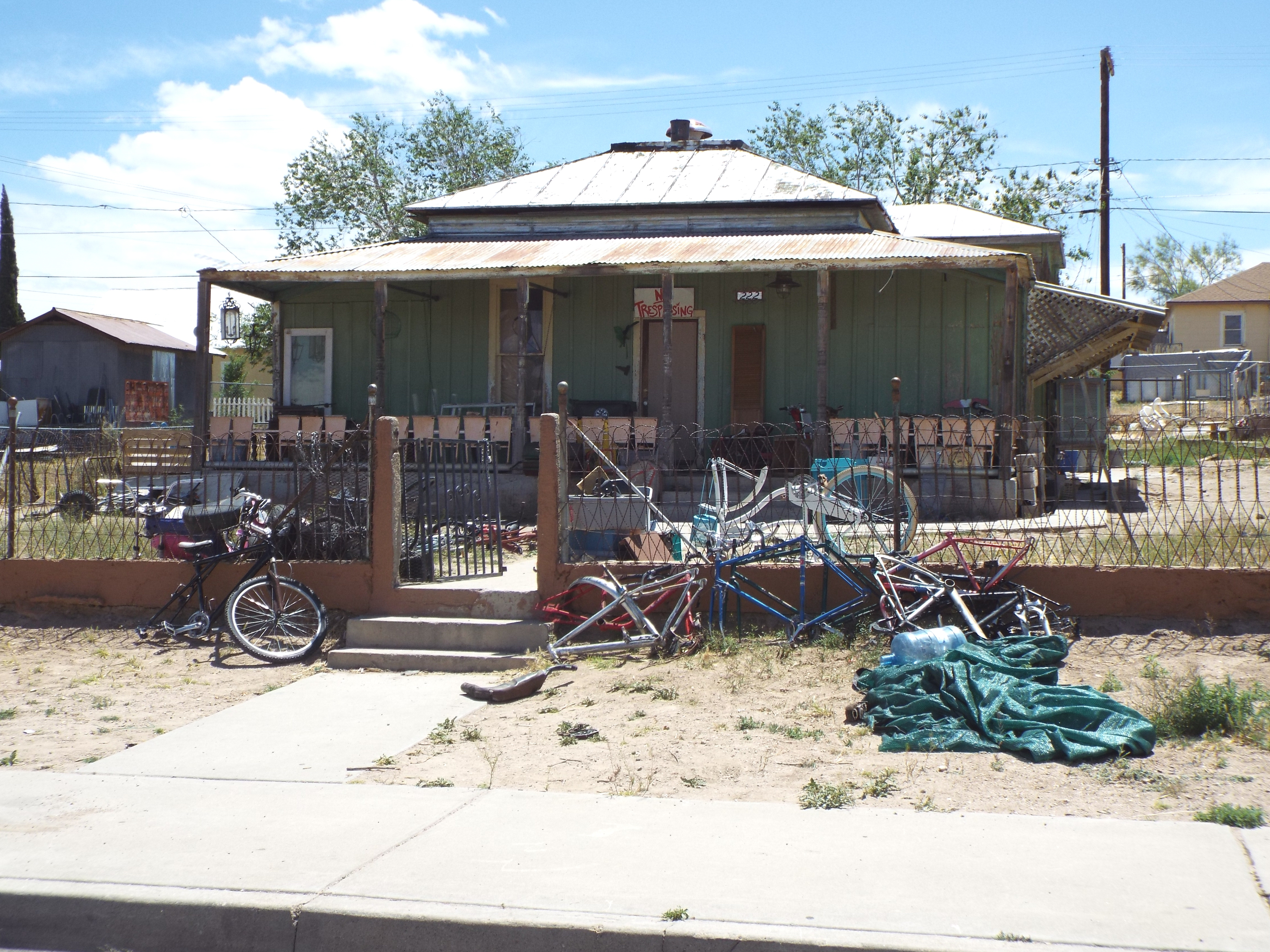
House at 536 East Park St – 1906

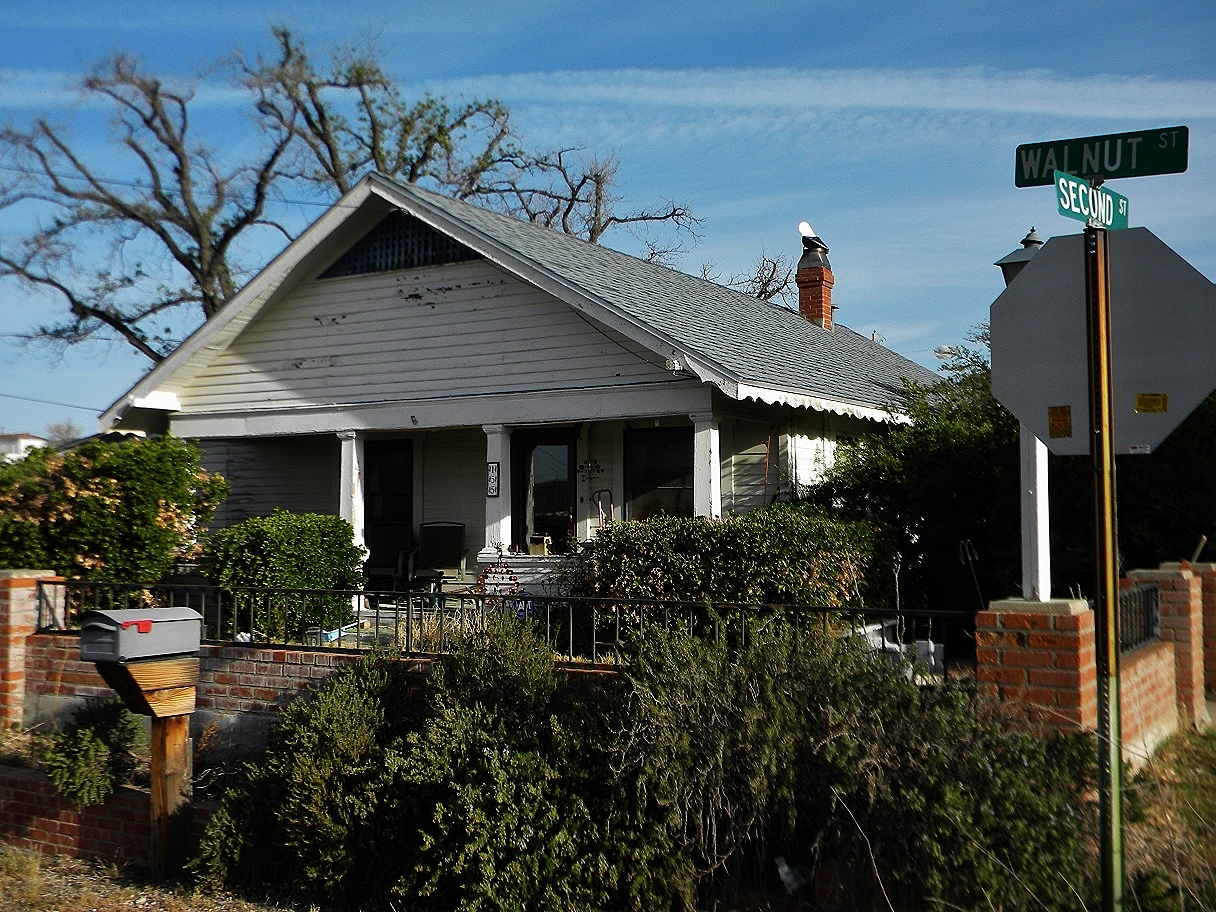
W. P. Mahoney House – 1919/1923

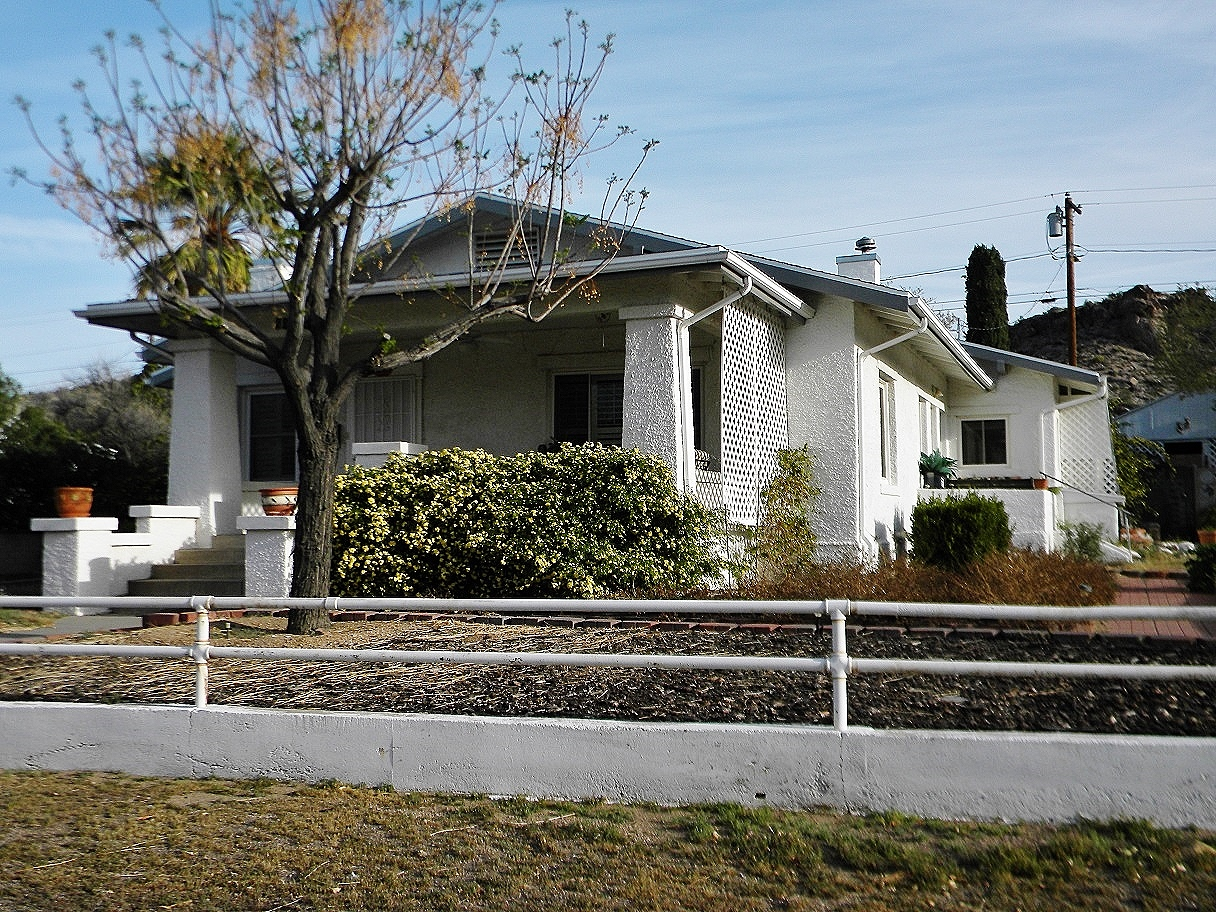
Dr. Toler White House – 1916

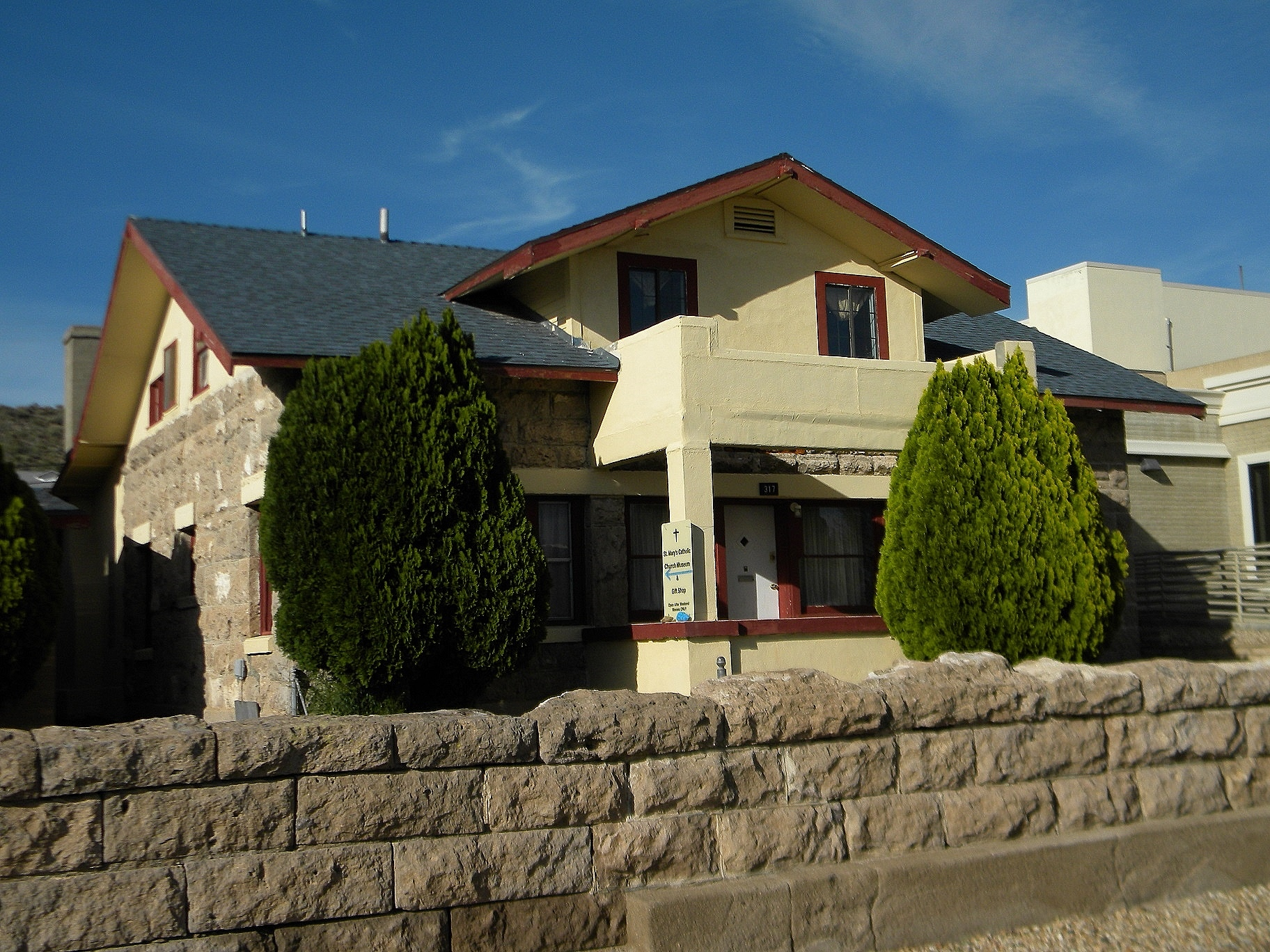
J. B. Wright House – 1912

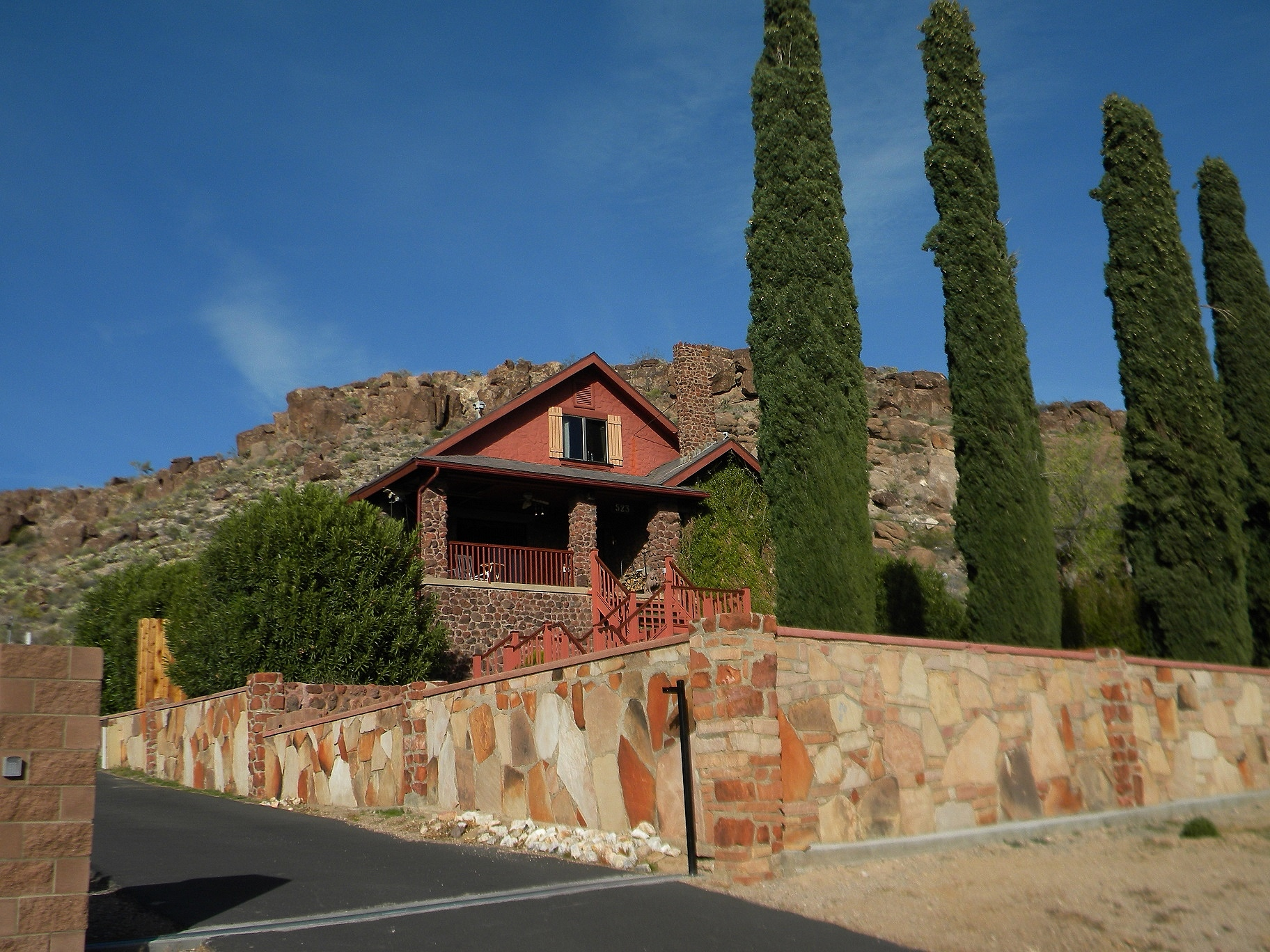
Max J. Anderson House – 1927

=== Restricted areas ===
Two properties which are listed in the National Register of Historic Places, but whose address is restricted by the government. However, Camp Beale Springs and its trails is now open to the public.

- Camp Beale Springs – Beale's Spring was used by Native Americans for centuries before Lt. Edward Beale traveled through the area in the 1850s. It was listed in the National Register of Historic Places on July 18, 1974, reference: #74000459.
- Northern Avenue Petroglyph Site – This is an archeological site which served as a ceremonial site and an animal facility, in Arizona's prehistory. It was listed in the National Register of Historic Places on October 3, 1996, reference #96001054.

== See also ==
- National Register of Historic Places listings in Mohave County, Arizona
