= National Register of Historic Places listings in Mohave County, Arizona =

Location of Mohave County in Arizona

This is a list of the National Register of Historic Places listings in Mohave County, Arizona. It is intended to be a complete list of the properties and districts on the National Register of Historic Places in Mohave County, Arizona, United States. The locations of National Register properties and districts for which the latitude and longitude coordinates are included below, may be seen in a map.

There are 70 properties and districts listed on the National Register in the county, including 1 that is also a National Historic Landmark.

This National Park Service list is complete through NPS recent listings posted May 1, 2026.

== Listings county-wide ==
	Name on the Register	Image	Date listed	Location	City or town	Description
1	J. Max Anderson House	J. Max Anderson House	May 14, 1986 (#86001110)	523 Pine St. 35°11′32″N 114°02′54″W	Kingman	House built of native stone in 1927.
2	R. L. Anderson House	R. L. Anderson House	May 28, 1987 (#87001160)	703 E. Beale; 35°11′20″N 114°02′47″W	Kingman	Brick house in Bungalow/Craftsman style, c. 1915.
3	Antelope Cave	Antelope Cave	October 10, 1975 (#75000351)	Address Restricted	Colorado City	
4	Armour and Jacobson Building	Armour and Jacobson Building	May 14, 1986 (#86001112)	426-430 Beale St. 35°11′21″N 114°03′03″W	Kingman	Early Commercial style building originally housing a bakery and an assay office
5	AT&SF Locomotive	AT&SF Locomotive	May 14, 1986 (#86001113)	City Park; 35°11′24″N 114°03′33″W	Kingman	
6	AT&T Building	AT&T Building	May 14, 1986 (#86001114)	Pine and 3rd Sts. 35°11′33″N 114°03′13″W	Kingman	
7	Big House	Big House	October 20, 1983 (#83003497)	W. Center St. 36°54′34″N 112°45′38″W	Moccasin	
8	Bighorn Cave		September 28, 1988 (#88001571)	Address Restricted	Oatman	
9	Arthur F. Black House		December 9, 1993 (#93001324)	707 Cerbat Ave. 35°11′41″N 114°03′30″W	Kingman	
10	William G. Blakely House	William G. Blakely House	May 14, 1986 (#86001115)	503 Spring St. 35°11′30″N 114°03′00″W	Kingman	
11	Ross H. Blakely House	Ross H. Blakely House	January 7, 1988 (#86003763)	519 E. Spring St. 35°11′29″N 114°02′56″W	Kingman	
12	Bonelli House	Bonelli House	April 24, 1975 (#75000352)	Spring and 5th Sts. 35°11′28″N 114°03′01″W	Kingman	
13	Duff T. Brown House	Duff T. Brown House	May 14, 1986 (#86001116)	541 E. Oak St. 35°11′25″N 114°02′54″W	Kingman	
14	Building at 218 Spring	Building at 218 Spring	May 14, 1986 (#86001117)	218 Spring St. 35°11′29″N 114°03′15″W	Kingman	
15	Camp Beale Springs		July 18, 1974 (#74000459)	Address Restricted	Kingman	
16	Raymond Carr House	Raymond Carr House	May 14, 1986 (#86001118)	620 E. Oak St. 35°11′22″N 114°02′50″W	Kingman	
17	Foster S. Dennis House	Foster S. Dennis House	May 14, 1986 (#86001119)	2nd and Park; 35°11′14″N 114°03′21″W	Kingman	
18	Desert Power & Water Co., Electric Power Plant	Desert Power & Water Co., Electric Power Plant	May 14, 1986 (#86001137)	Bounded by AT&SF railroad tracks, Spillway Ln., Park, and 1st Sts. 35°11′20″N 114°03′30″W	Kingman	
19	Durlin Hotel	Durlin Hotel	August 25, 1983 (#83002988)	Main St. 35°01′36″N 114°22′58″W	Oatman	
20	Elks' Lodge No. 468	Elks' Lodge No. 468	May 14, 1986 (#86001138)	4th and Oak Sts. 35°11′27″N 114°03′08″W	Kingman	
21	S. T. Elliott House	S. T. Elliott House	May 14, 1986 (#86001139)	537 Spring St. 35°11′29″N 114°02′54″W	Kingman	
22	J. M. Gates House		May 14, 1986 (#86001140)	714 E. Oak St. 35°11′21″N 114°02′46″W	Kingman	
23	Grand Wash Archeological District		February 8, 1980 (#80000369)	Address Restricted	Lake Mead	
24	W. A. Gruninger Building	W. A. Gruninger Building	May 14, 1986 (#86001141)	424 Beale St. 35°11′21″N 114°03′04″W	Kingman	
25	Gymnasium	Gymnasium	May 14, 1986 (#86001142)	1st St. 35°11′29″N 114°03′27″W	Kingman	
26	Hardyville Cemetery	Hardyville Cemetery	August 30, 2001 (#01000905)	1776 State Route 95; 35°07′15″N 114°35′11″W	Bullhead City	
27	Hoover Dam	Hoover Dam	April 8, 1981 (#81000382)	East of Las Vegas on U.S. Route 93; 36°00′58″N 114°44′12″W	Dolan Springs	
28	Horse Valley Ranch	Horse Valley Ranch	April 12, 1984 (#84000781)	Lake Mead National Recreation Area; 36°07′02″N 113°30′05″W	Littlefield	
29	House at 105 Spring St.	House at 105 Spring St.	May 14, 1986 (#86001143)	105 Spring St. 35°11′32″N 114°03′25″W	Kingman	
30	House at 519 Golconda		May 14, 1986 (#86001148)	519 Golconda; 35°11′08″N 114°03′01″W	Kingman	
31	House at 527 Pine	House at 527 Pine	May 14, 1986 (#86001145)	527 Pine St. 35°11′31″N 114°02′55″W	Kingman	
32	House at 536 Park	House at 536 Park	May 14, 1986 (#86001146)	536 Park; 35°11′09″N 114°02′58″W	Kingman	
33	House at 809 Grand View	House at 809 Grand View	May 14, 1986 (#86001144)	809 Grand View; 35°11′46″N 114°03′39″W	Kingman	
34	Ross E. Householder House	Ross E. Householder House	May 14, 1986 (#86001149)	431 Spring St. 35°11′30″N 114°03′01″W	Kingman	
35	Hubbs House	Hubbs House	June 15, 1978 (#78000554)	4th and Golconda Sts. 35°11′08″N 114°03′07″W	Kingman	
36	IOOF Building	IOOF Building	May 14, 1986 (#86001150)	208 N. 5th St. 35°11′22″N 114°03′00″W	Kingman	
37	John Osterman Gas Station	John Osterman Gas Station	March 15, 2012 (#09000543)	888 US 66; 35°31′44″N 113°25′33″W	Peach Springs	
38	George R. Kayser House	George R. Kayser House	May 14, 1986 (#86001151)	604 E. Oak St. 35°11′23″N 114°02′53″W	Kingman	
39	Kingman Army Air Forces Flexible Gunnery School Radio Tower	Kingman Army Air Forces Flexible Gunnery School Radio Tower	February 5, 1999 (#99000107)	7000 Flightline Dr. 35°15′31″N 113°56′38″W	Kingman	
40	Kingman Commercial Historic District	Kingman Commercial Historic District	May 14, 1986 (#86001153)	300 and 400 blocks of Andy Devine Ave. 35°11′20″N 114°03′08″W	Kingman	
41	Kingman Grammar School	Kingman Grammar School	May 14, 1986 (#86001154)	500 Maple St. 35°11′34″N 114°03′00″W	Kingman	
42	Lefever House	Lefever House	May 14, 1986 (#86001162)	525 E. Oak St. 35°11′26″N 114°02′57″W	Kingman	
43	Little Red School	Little Red School	May 14, 1986 (#86001156)	219 N. 4th St. 35°11′25″N 114°03′08″W	Kingman	
44	Dr. David S. Livingston House		May 14, 1986 (#86001158)	222 Topeka; 35°11′15″N 114°03′17″W	Kingman	
45	Lovin & Withers Investment House	Lovin & Withers Investment House	May 14, 1986 (#86001161)	722 E. Beale St. 35°11′17″N 114°02′44″W	Kingman	
46	Lovin and Withers Cottages	Lovin and Withers Cottages	May 14, 1986 (#86001159)	8th and Topeka; 35°11′10″N 114°02′44″W	Kingman	
47	W. P. Mahoney House	W. P. Mahoney House	May 14, 1986 (#86001163)	155 E. Walnut; 35°11′40″N 114°03′18″W	Kingman	
48	Masonic Temple	Masonic Temple	May 19, 1986 (#86001164)	212 N. 4th St. 35°11′24″N 114°03′07″W	Kingman	
49	Mohave County Courthouse and Jail	Mohave County Courthouse and Jail	August 25, 1983 (#83002990)	310 N. 4th St. 35°11′31″N 114°03′07″W	Kingman	
50	Mohave County Hospital	Mohave County Hospital	May 14, 1986 (#86001165)	W. Beale between Grand View and 1st St. 35°11′26″N 114°03′33″W	Kingman	
51	Northern Avenue Petroglyph Site		October 3, 1996 (#96001054)	Address Restricted	Kingman	
52	Oatman Drug Company Building	Oatman Drug Company Building	April 6, 2006 (#05001064)	1 Main St. 35°01′33″N 114°22′55″W	Oatman	
53	Old Trails Bridge	Old Trails Bridge	September 30, 1988 (#88001676)	Abandoned U.S. Route 66 over the Colorado River; 34°42′57″N 114°29′05″W	Topock	
54	Peach Springs Trading Post	Peach Springs Trading Post	November 21, 2003 (#03001196)	863 W. State Route 66; 35°31′44″N 113°25′37″W	Peach Springs	
55	Pipe Spring National Monument	Pipe Spring National Monument	October 15, 1966 (#66000186)	State Route 389; 36°51′43″N 112°43′47″W	Moccasin	
56	Saint John's Methodist Episcopal Church	Saint John's Methodist Episcopal Church	May 14, 1986 (#86001170)	Spring and 5th Sts. 35°11′28″N 114°03′00″W	Kingman	
57	Saint Mary's Catholic Church	Saint Mary's Catholic Church	May 14, 1986 (#86001166)	3rd and Spring Sts. 35°11′30″N 114°03′11″W	Kingman	
58	Sand Hollow Wash Bridge	Sand Hollow Wash Bridge	September 30, 1988 (#88001657)	Mohave County Route 91 (Old U.S. Route 91) over Sand Hollow Wash; 36°49′40″N 113°59′59″W	Littlefield	
59	Mrs. M. P. Sargent House	Mrs. M. P. Sargent House	May 14, 1986 (#86001167)	426 Topeka; 35°11′14″N 114°03′04″W	Kingman	
60	Schoolhouse at Truxton Canyon Training School	Schoolhouse at Truxton Canyon Training School	November 21, 2003 (#03001197)	State Route 66; 35°23′12″N 113°39′37″W	Valentine	
61	G. H. Sullivan Lodging House	G. H. Sullivan Lodging House	May 14, 1986 (#86001168)	218 E. Oak; 35°11′26″N 114°03′16″W	Kingman	
62	Tyrell House	Tyrell House	May 14, 1986 (#86001172)	133 Beale St. 35°11′24″N 114°03′20″W	Kingman	
63	US Post Office	US Post Office	May 14, 1986 (#86001173)	310 N. 4th St. 35°11′25″N 114°03′06″W	Kingman	
64	Van Marter Building	Van Marter Building	May 14, 1986 (#86001174)	423-427 Beale St. 35°11′23″N 114°03′04″W	Kingman	
65	O. E. Walker House	O. E. Walker House	May 14, 1986 (#86001175)	906 Madison; 35°11′04″N 114°02′36″W	Kingman	
66	Dr. Toler R. White House	Dr. Toler R. White House	May 14, 1986 (#86001176)	509 Spring St. 35°11′29″N 114°02′59″W	Kingman	
67	E. B. Williams House	E. B. Williams House	May 14, 1986 (#86001177)	531 E. Oak St. 35°11′26″N 114°02′59″W	Kingman	
68	Willow Beach Gauging Station	Willow Beach Gauging Station	March 21, 1986 (#86000587)	Lake Mead National Recreation Area; 35°53′17″N 114°40′57″W	Willow Beach	
69	J. B. Wright House	J. B. Wright House	May 14, 1986 (#86001178)	317 Spring St. 35°11′30″N 114°03′09″W	Kingman	
70	Charles Ziemer House		May 14, 1986 (#86001179)	507 E. Oak St. 35°11′26″N 114°03′00″W	Kingman	

== See also ==
- List of National Historic Landmarks in Arizona
- National Register of Historic Places listings in Arizona
