= Oatman =

Oatman may refer to:

- Oatman (surname)
- Oatman, Arizona, a former mining town in the Black Mountains of Mohave County, Arizona, United States
- County Route 10 (Mohave County, Arizona), also known as Oatman Highway or Oatman–Topock Highway.
- County Route 153 (Mohave County, Arizona), also known as Oatman Road or Boundary Cone Road.

== See also ==
- Oatman Drug Company Building, a historic building in Oatman, Arizona, United States
- Oatman Filling Station, a historic building in Eau Claire, Wisconsin, United States
