= Kingman Grammar School =

- U.S. National Register of Historic Places
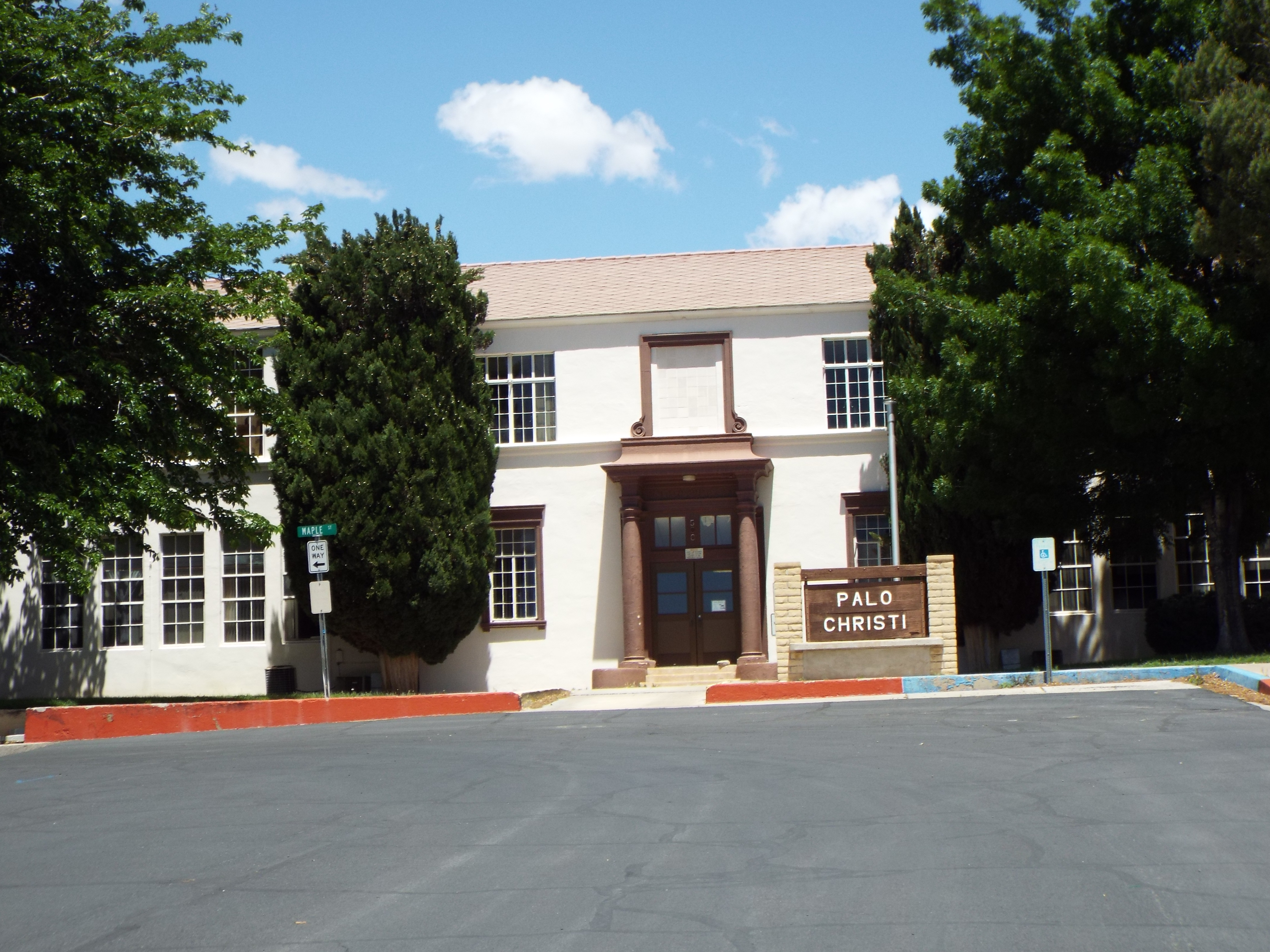

- Location within Arizona Location within the United States
- Location: 500 Maple St., Kingman, Arizona
- Coordinates: 35°11′34″N 114°03′03″W
- Built: 1928
- Architect: John S. Mulligan, Jr., Pierson & Johnson
- Architectural style: Late 19th And 20th Century Revivals
- MPS: Kingman MRA
- NRHP reference No.: 86001154
- Added to NRHP: May 14, 1986

Kingman Grammar School (now named Palo Christi Elementary School) is an elementary school building located in Kingman, Arizona, that was listed on the National Register of Historic Places in 1986.

== Description ==
Kingman Grammar School is located on Pine Street and was built in 1928. The school is in the style of the late 19th and 20th Century Revivals. John S. Mulligan Jr. was the architect and Pierson & Johnson were the contractors from Phoenix, Arizona. It replaced the Little Red Schoolhouse, which is a one-room school built in 1896. At the time, grades First to Eight were taught here. Today the school is known as Palo Christi Elementary School which teaches Kindergartner to Sixth Grades for the downtown area of Kingman.

== See also ==
- National Register of Historic Places listings in Mohave County, Arizona
- Kingman Unified School District
