= J. M. Gates House =

Historic house in Kingman, Arizona, United States

- U.S. National Register of Historic Places
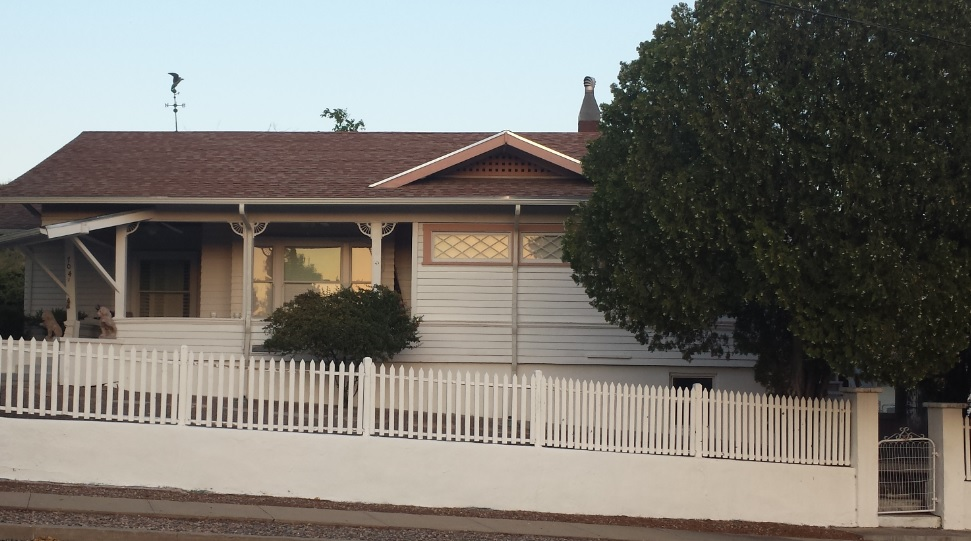
- Gates House, September 2015

- Location within Arizona Location within the United States
- Location: 714 East Oak Street; Kingman, Arizona
- Coordinates: 35°11′21″N 114°2′46″W
- Built: 1917
- Architectural style: Bungalow/Craftsman
- MPS: Kingman MRA
- NRHP reference No.: 86001140
- Added to NRHP: May 14, 1986

The J. M. Gates House is a Bungalow/Craftsman-style house located in Kingman, Arizona, United States. It was evaluated for National Register listing as part of a 1985 study of 63 historic resources in Kingman that led to this and many others being listed.

== Description ==
The J. M. Gates House is located at 714 East Oak Street in Kingman, Arizona. The house was built in 1915 in the Bungalow/Craftsman style with the only bungalow with a corner entry. Mr. Gates came to Arizona in 1910, worked at a mercantile store in Chloride, Arizona. In 1915, Gates and local businessmen Allen E. and John Ware started the Central Commercial Company. The store open in 1917, eventually the Gates family owned the business. The family occupied the home until 1952. The house was added to the National Register of Historic Places in 1986.

== See also ==
- National Register of Historic Places listings in Mohave County, Arizona
