= R. L. Anderson House =

Historic house in Kingman, Arizona, United States

- U.S. National Register of Historic Places
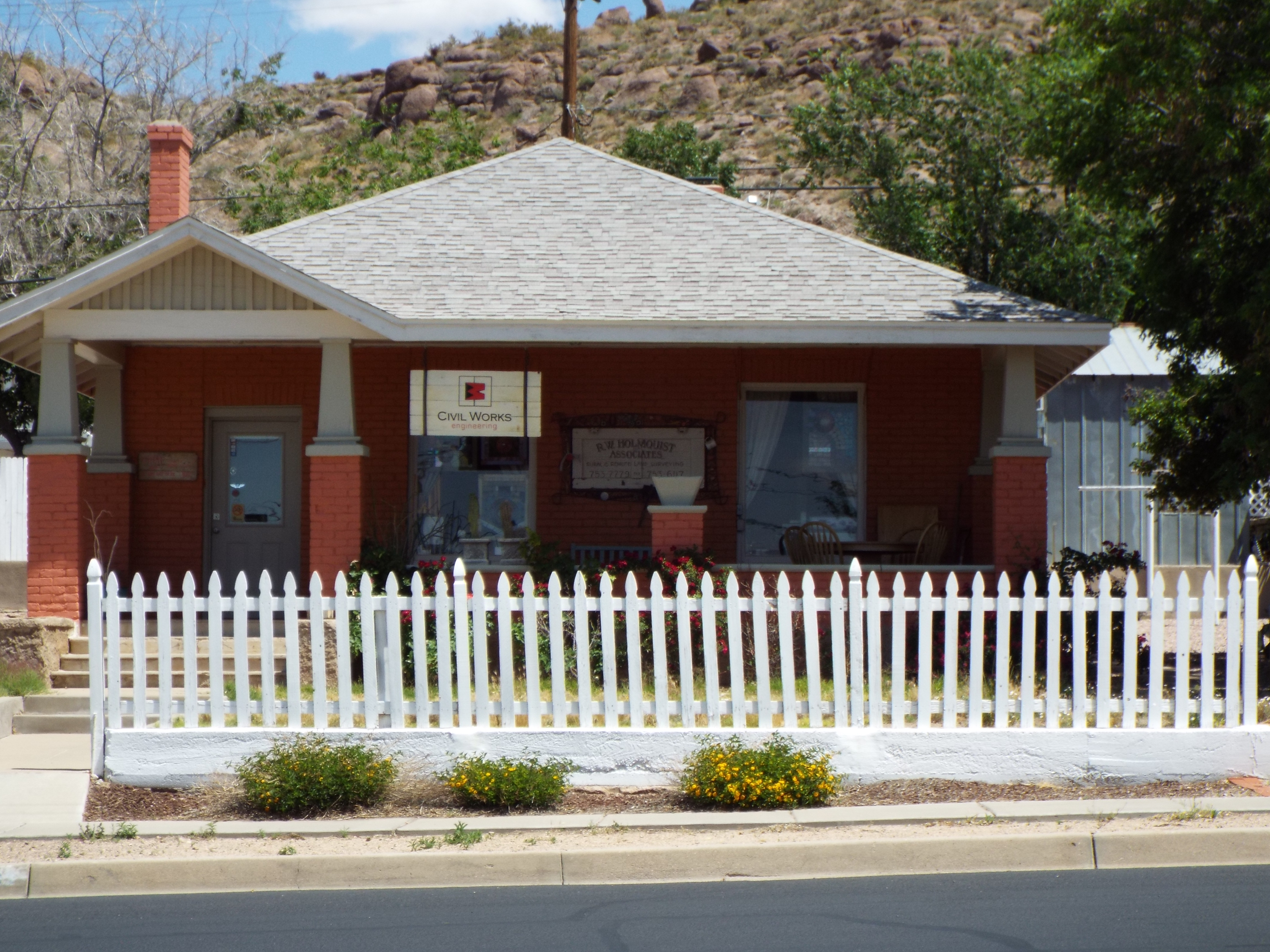
- Anderson House, May 2019

- Location within Arizona Location within the United States
- Location: Kingman, Arizona
- Coordinates: 35°11′20″N 114°2′47″W
- Built: 1915
- Architect: Lovin & Withers
- Architectural style: Bungalow/Craftsman style
- MPS: Kingman MRA
- NRHP reference No.: 87001160
- Added to NRHP: May 28, 1987

The R. L. Anderson House is a Bungalow/Craftsman style house located in Kingman, Arizona, United States. The house is listed on the National Register of Historic Places (NRHP).

== Description ==
The R. L. Anderson House is located at 703 Beale Street in Kingman. The home was built around 1915 by Lovin & Withers in the Bungalow/Craftsman style. It is one of the houses built with brick instead of stone or wood or adobe style.

== History ==
The residence was evaluated for NRHP listing as part of a 1985 study of 63 historic resources in Kingman that led to this and many others being listed. The house was added to the NRHP in 1986 as No. 87001160.

== See also ==
- National Register of Historic Places listings in Mohave County, Arizona
