= Armour and Jacobson Building =

- U.S. National Register of Historic Places
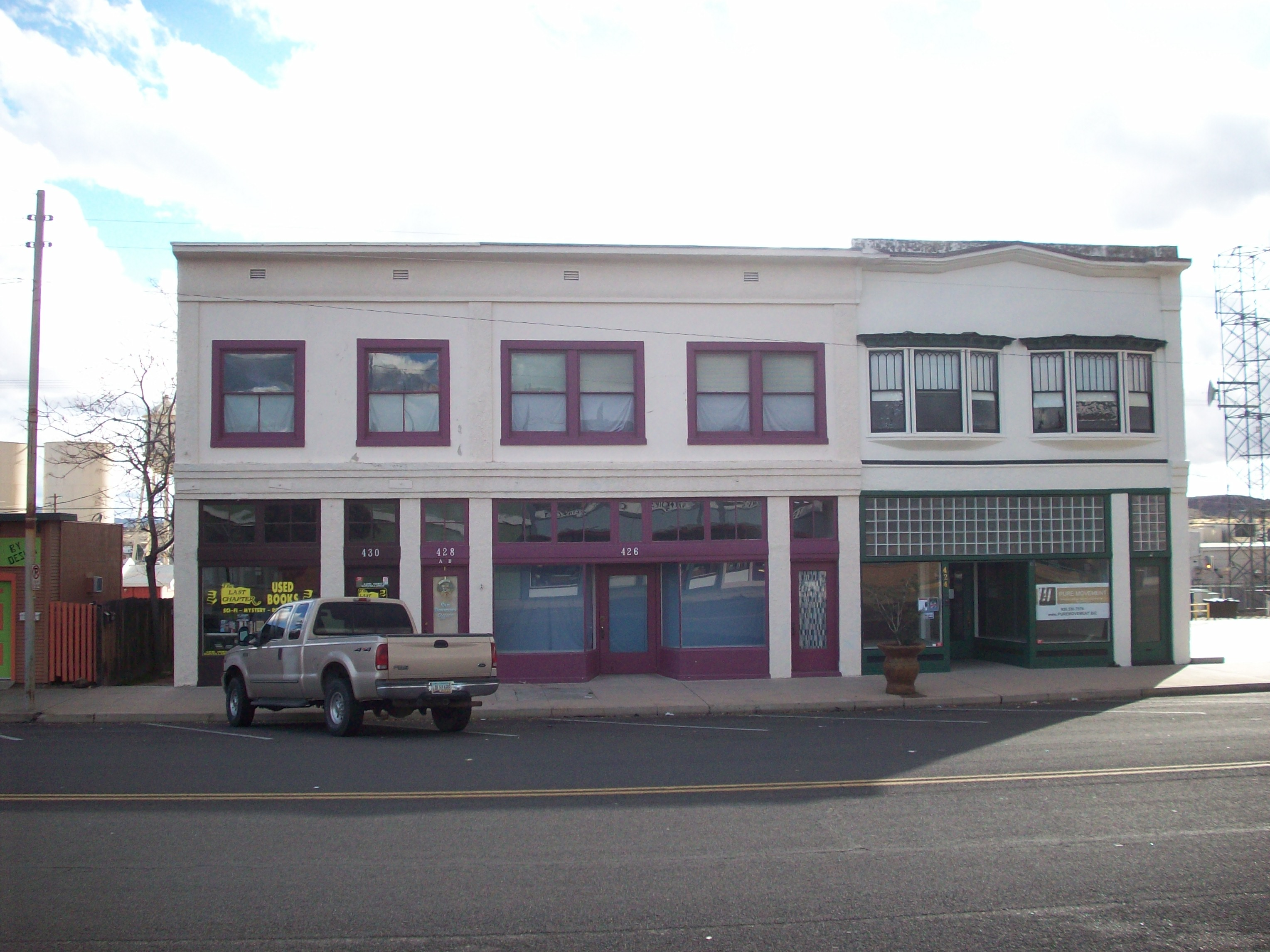

- Location within Arizona Location within the United States
- Location: 426 to 430 Beale Street; Kingman, Arizona
- Coordinates: 35°11′21″N 114°3′3″W
- Built: 1921
- Architect: W.A. Greninger, & Son
- Architectural style: Early Commercial
- MPS: Kingman MRA
- NRHP reference No.: 86001112
- Added to NRHP: May 14, 1986

The Armour & Jacobson Building is a commercial building located in Kingman, Arizona. It is listed on the National Register of Historic Places.

It was evaluated for National Register listing as part of a 1985 study of 63 historic resources in Kingman that led to this and many others being listed.

== Description ==
Armour & Jacobson Building is located at 426 to 430 Beale Street in Kingman, Arizona. The building was built in 1921 in the Early Commercial style. The building was built by Gruninger & Son for E. E. Armour, a baker and Robert Jacobson, a mining engineer. The building would house a bakery and an assay office. Mr. Jacobson came to Kingman in 1916, as he was consulting for several Mohave County mining companies. The W. A. Gruninger Building and Armour & Jacobson Building are right together on the same block of the street. The Armour & Jacobson Building also was an investment property, the first floor had store fronts and the second floor had office for the downtown area of Kingman.

The building was added the National Register of Historic Places in 1986.
