= Sand Hollow Wash Bridge =

- U.S. National Register of Historic Places
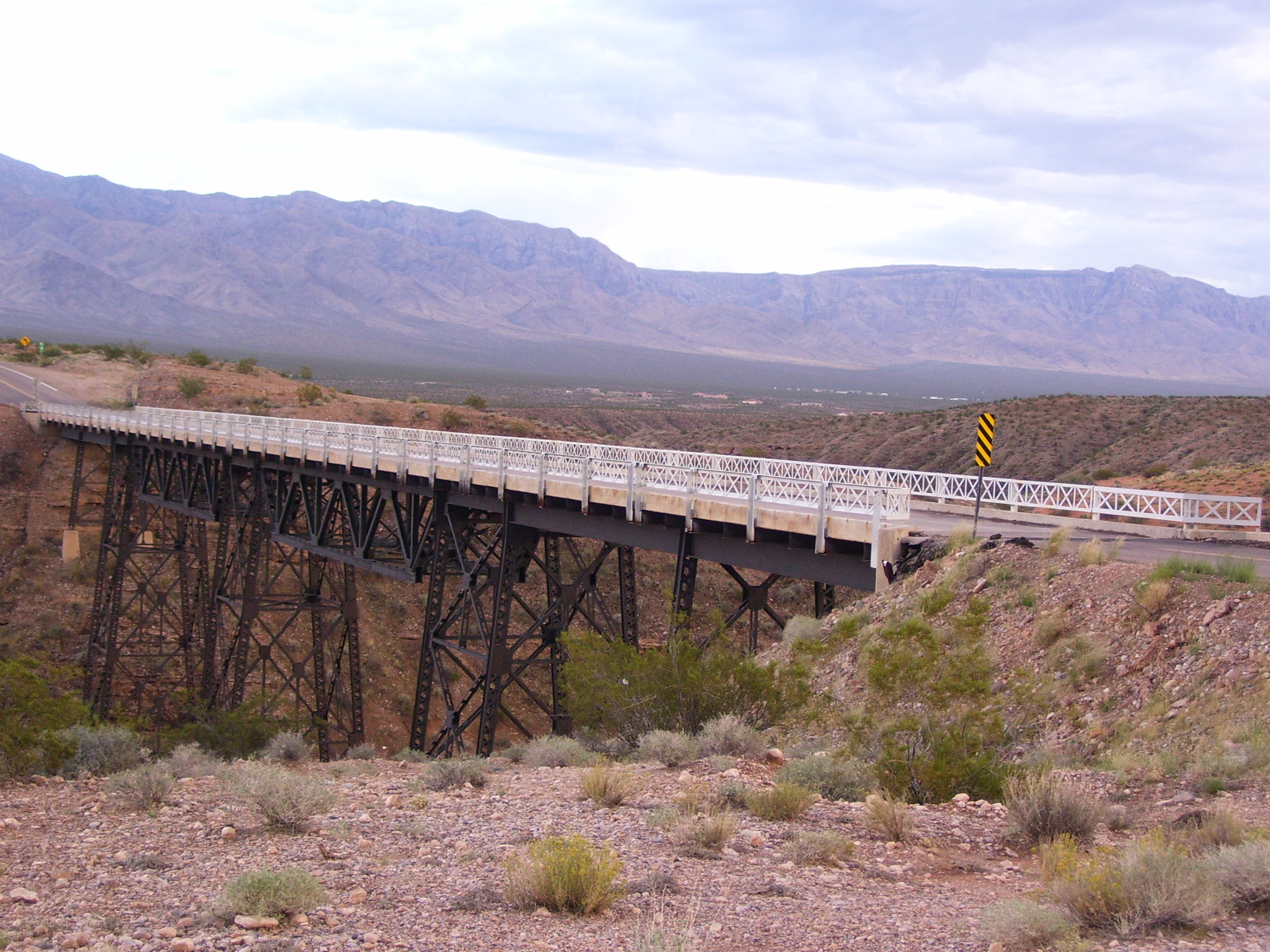
- The bridge in 2014

- Location within Arizona Location within the United States
- Location: Old US 91 over Sand Hollow Wash
- Nearest city: Littlefield, Arizona
- Coordinates: 36°49′40″N 113°59′59″W
- Area: 0.2 acres (0.081 ha)
- Built: 1929
- Built by: Arizona Highway Dept.; Burke, James J.
- Architectural style: Warren deck truss
- MPS: Vehicular Bridges in Arizona MPS
- NRHP reference No.: 88001657
- Added to NRHP: September 30, 1988

The Sand Hollow Wash Bridge near Littlefield, Arizona, United States, is a historic Warren deck truss bridge built in 1929. It brought the old U.S. Route 91 (US 91) over Sand Hollow Wash. It was listed on the National Register of Historic Places in 1988.

== See also ==
- List of bridges on the National Register of Historic Places in Arizona
- National Register of Historic Places listings in Mohave County, Arizona
