= Grand Wash Archeological District =

Archaeological site in Arizona, United States

- U.S. National Register of Historic Places
- U.S. Historic district
- Nearest city: Lake Mead, Arizona
- Area: 8,960 acres (3,630 ha)
- NRHP reference No.: 80000369
- Added to NRHP: February 8, 1980

The Grand Wash Archeological District is a 8,960-acre (3,630 ha) historic district in Mohave County, Arizona in the Lake Mead National Recreation Area that includes multiple archeological sites and was listed on the National Register of Historic Places in 1980. The area has 210 identified contributing sites, including prehistoric campsites, animal facilities, and manufacturing facilities. It was listed on the National Register for its potential to yield information in the future.

It includes 130 sites in the Tassi Spring area that were identified in 1978 and 1997 by the Western Archaeological Center.
