= Dr. Toler R. White House =

United States historic place in Kingman, Arizona

- U.S. National Register of Historic Places
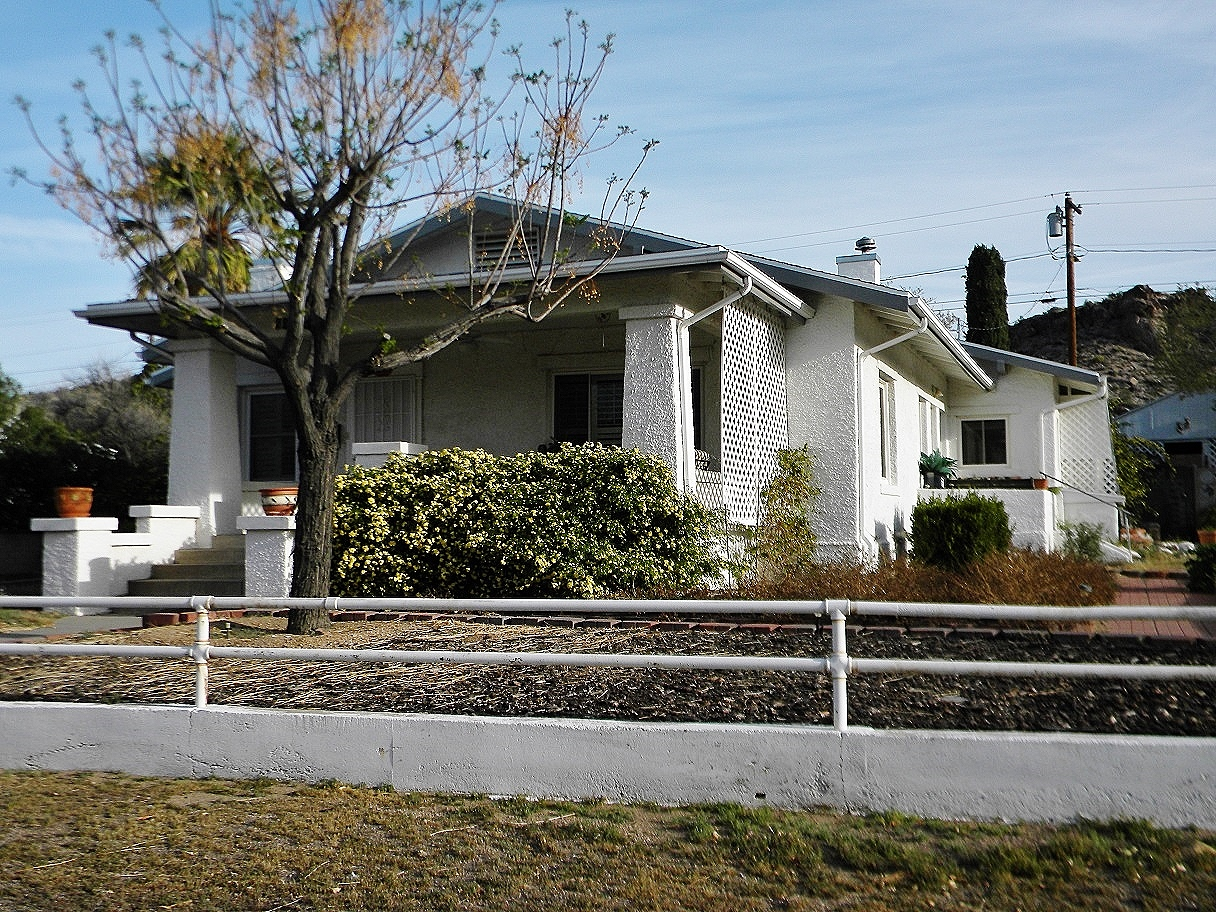

- Location within Arizona Location within the United States
- Location: 509 Spring St., Kingman, Arizona
- Coordinates: 35°11′29″N 114°2′59″W
- Area: less than one acre
- Built: 1916
- Architectural style: Bungalow/Craftsman
- MPS: Kingman MRA
- NRHP reference No.: 86001176
- Added to NRHP: May 14, 1986

The Dr. Toler R. White House is at 509 Spring Street, Kingman, Arizona. The house was built in 1916. The house is a bungalow/Craftsman style. Dr. White came to town in 1910 or so, after working in the mining and reservations doctor. He lived here until his death in 1945. The home is on the National Register of Historical Places, and its reference number is 86001176.

It was evaluated for National Register listing as part of a 1985 study of 63 historic resources in Kingman that led to this and many others being listed.
