= Van Marter Building =

- U.S. National Register of Historic Places
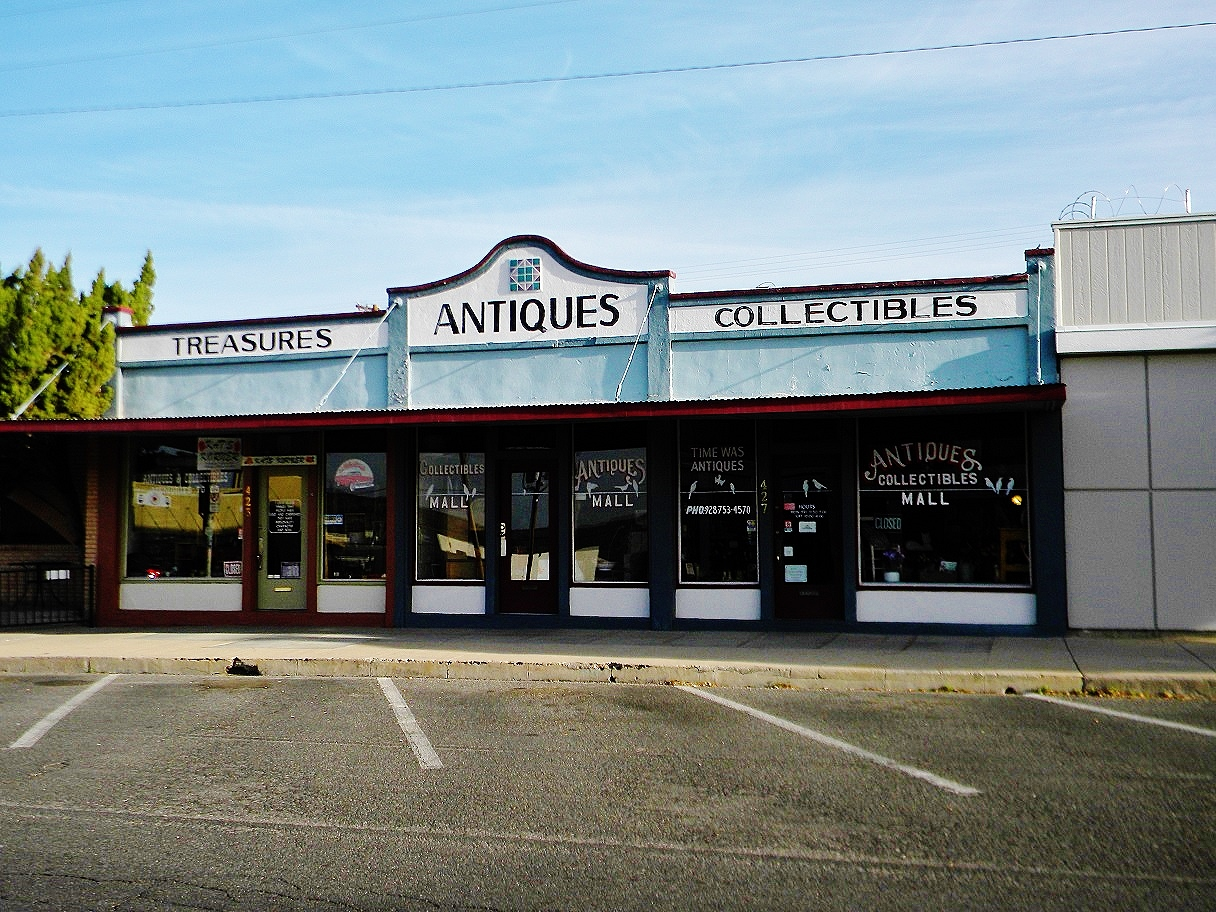

- Location within Arizona Location within the United States
- Location: 423–427 Beale Street; Kingman, Arizona
- Coordinates: 35°11′23″N 114°3′4″W
- Built: 1921
- Architect: Lammers, J.B.
- Architectural style: Mission/Spanish Revival
- MPS: Kingman MRA
- NRHP reference No.: 86001174
- Added to NRHP: May 14, 1986

The Van Marter Building, located at 423–427 East Beale Street in Kingman, Arizona, was built in 1921 and has been listed in the National Register of Historic Placed since May 14, 1986. The building was built with a Mission/Spanish Revival architectural style. J. B. Lammers of Flagstaff, Arizona was the contractor.

The building was the business location for Van Marter Enterprizes, housing his mortician and shoemaker shops. The building had office space, shoe shop, headstones sales, and lease office space.
