= IOOF Building (Kingman, Arizona) =

- U.S. National Register of Historic Places
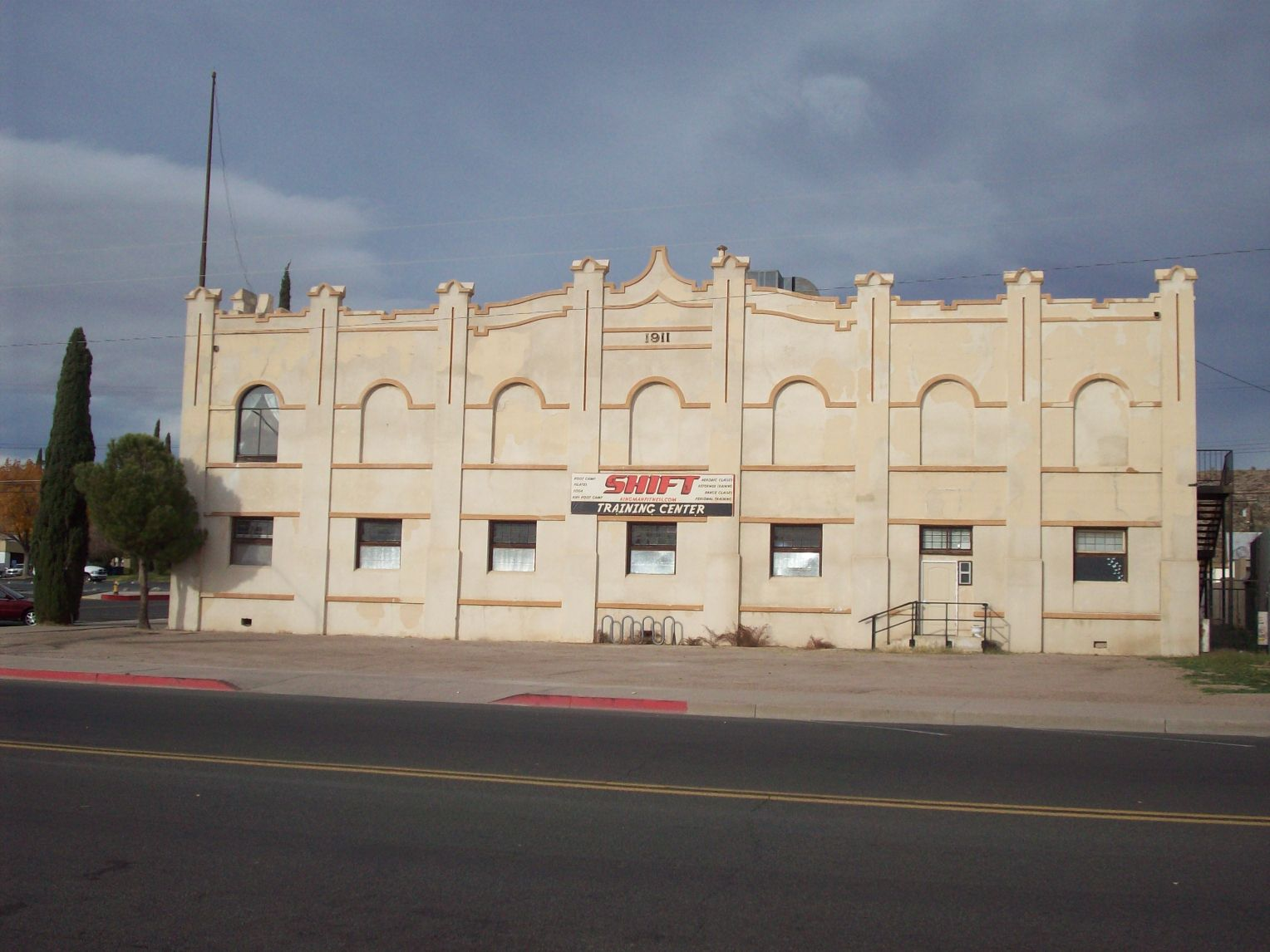

- Location within Arizona Location within the United States
- Location: 208 North Fifth Street, Kingman, Arizona
- Coordinates: 35°11′22″N 114°3′0″W
- Built: 1912
- Architectural style: Mission/Spanish Revival
- MPS: Kingman MRA
- NRHP reference No.: 86001150
- Added to NRHP: May 14, 1986

IOOF Building is a historic building in Kingman, Arizona. The two-story building was built in 1912. The building was in the Mission/Spanish Revival style. This was the second fraternal organization clubhouse in Kingman. In 1922, the first fire station in Kingman was built next door. IOOF is the Independent Order of Odd Fellows. Today, IOOF no longer owns the building, and it serves as the Kingman office of the Historic Electric Vehicle Foundation. This building is on the National Register of Historic Places and the number is 86001150.

It was evaluated for National Register listing as part of a 1985 study of 63 historic resources in Kingman that led to this and many others being listed.
