= O. E. Walker House =

United States historic place in Kingman, Arizona

- U.S. National Register of Historic Places
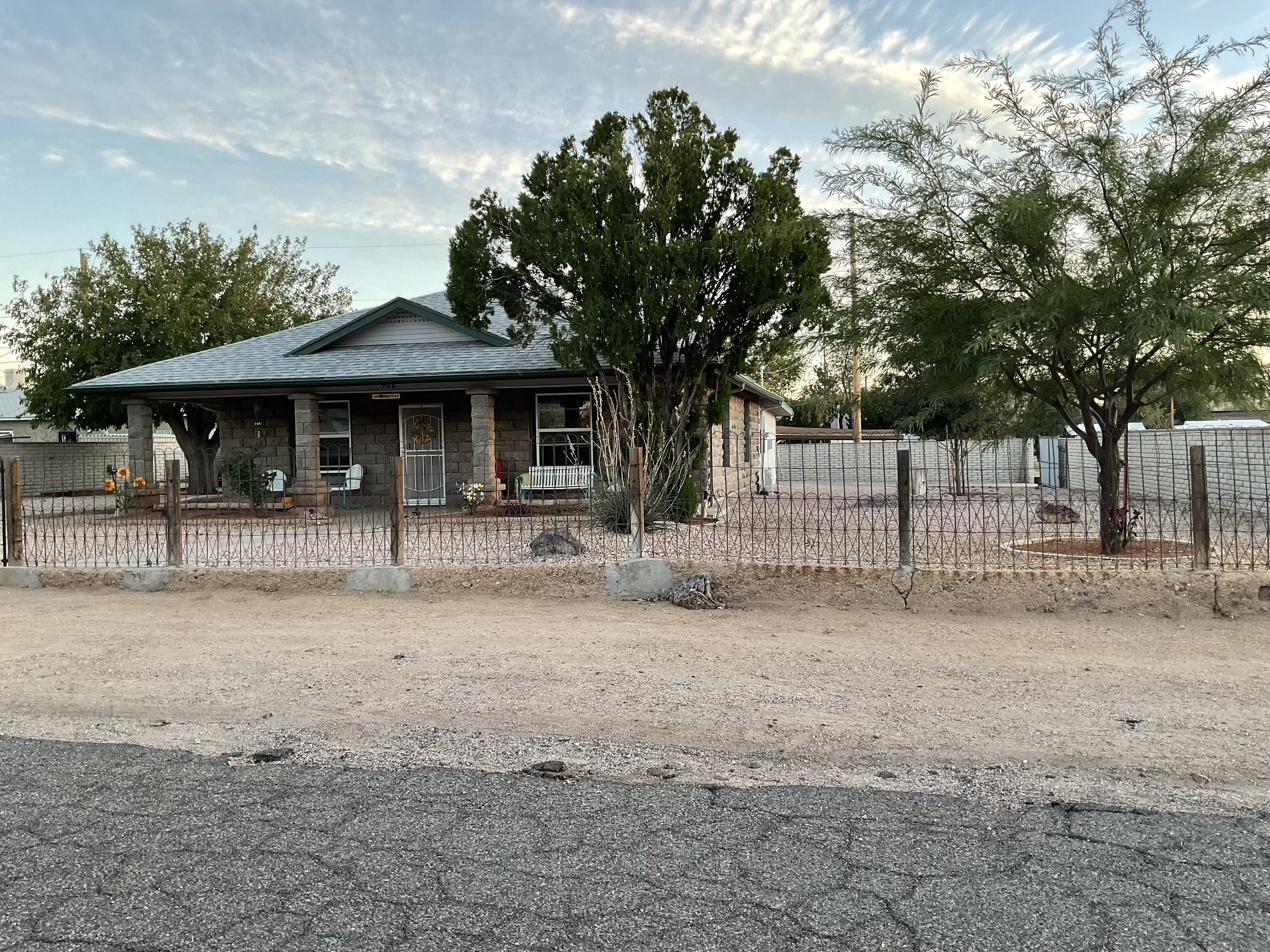
- O. E. Walker House in 2024

- Location within Arizona Location within the United States
- Location: 906 Madison; Kingman, Arizona
- Coordinates: 35°11′4″N 114°2′36″W
- Area: less than one acre
- Built: 1916
- Architectural style: Bungalow/Craftsman
- MPS: Kingman MRA
- NRHP reference No.: 86001175
- Added to NRHP: May 14, 1986

O. E. Walker House is at 906 Madison Street, Kingman, Arizona. The house was built around c. 1916. The house is in Bungalow/Craftsman style. The house is the only stone bungalow/Neo Colonial Revival style in Kingman. The house was built in native stone. Mr. Walker was member of Mohave County Board of Supervisors. Minnie E. Gulley set up operation of hospital in the house on August 19. It was known as the first hospital in Kingman. The house is on the National Register of Historical Places and the number is 86001175.

It was evaluated for National Register listing as part of a 1985 study of 63 historic resources in Kingman that led to this and many others being listed.
