= Lovin & Withers Investment House =

Historic house in Arizona, United States

- U.S. National Register of Historic Places
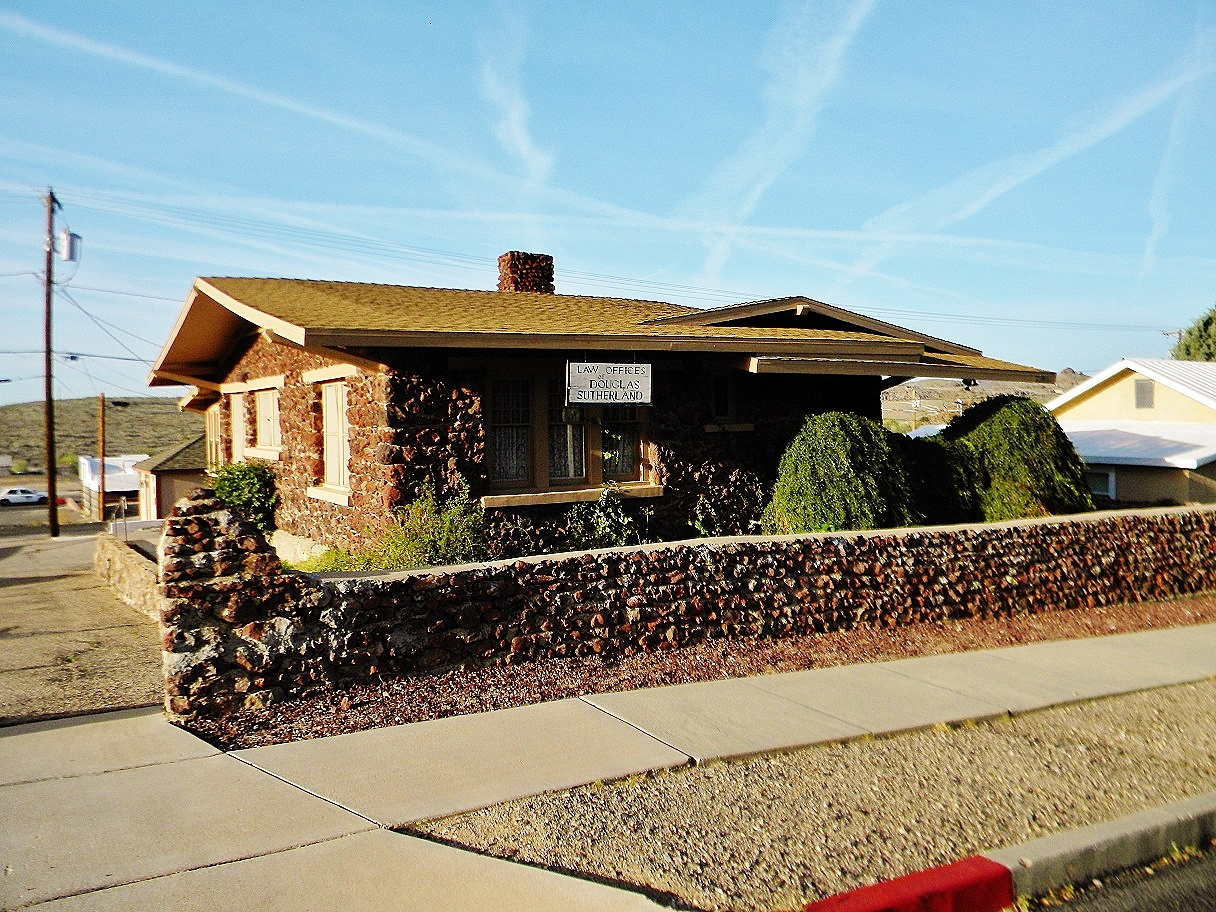

- Location within Arizona Location within the United States
- Location: 722 Beale Street; Kingman, Arizona
- Coordinates: 35°11′17″N 114°2′44″W
- Built: 1914
- Architect: Lovin & Withers, Inc.
- Architectural style: Bungalow/Craftsman
- MPS: Kingman MRA
- NRHP reference No.: 86001161
- Added to NRHP: May 14, 1986

Lovin & Withers Investment House, located at 722 Beale Street in Kingman, Arizona, was built c. 1914 in the Bungalow/Craftsman style. Lovin & Withers built the house as contractors, using native stone. It closely resembles the other two houses on Pine Street. The house was a rental property during a growth period, and today, it is an office for a local lawyer. It is on the National Register of Historic Places as number 86001161.

It was evaluated for National Register listing as part of a 1985 study of 63 historic resources in Kingman that led to this and many others being listed.
