= Saint Mary's Catholic Church (Kingman, Arizona) =

Historic church in Arizona, United States

- U.S. National Register of Historic Places
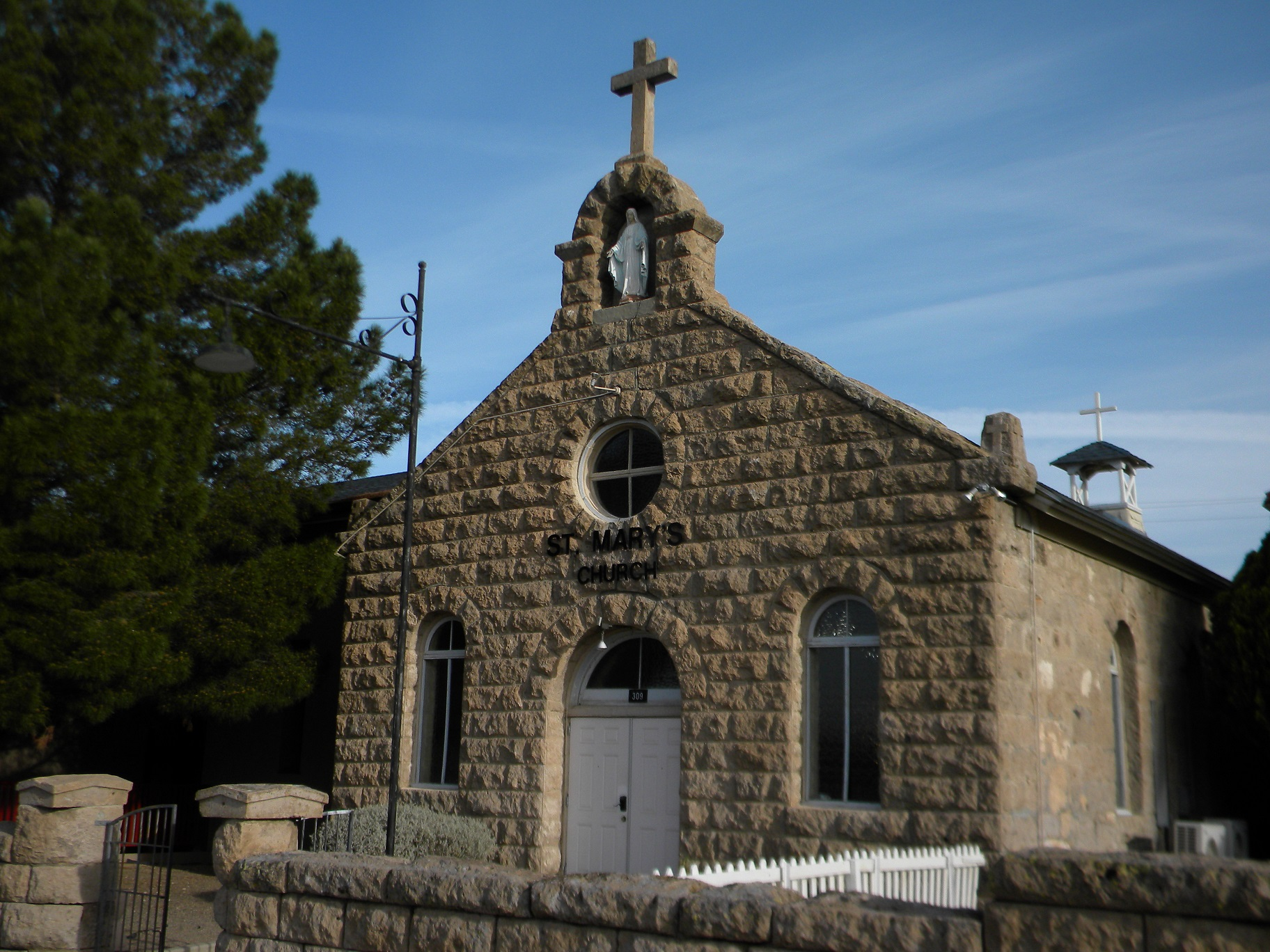

- Location within Arizona Location within the United States
- Location: Kingman, Arizona
- Coordinates: 35°11′30″N 114°3′11″W
- Built: 1906
- Architectural style: Mission/Spanish Revival
- MPS: Kingman MRA
- NRHP reference No.: 86001166
- Added to NRHP: May 14, 1986

Saint Mary's Catholic Church is between Third and Spring Streets in Kingman, Arizona. The church was built in 1906–07 with the Mission/Spanish Revival style. The native stone came from Metcalfe Quarry. The Catholic Church had two fundraising events to help raise money for St. Mary's and they were done in 1903 and 06. The church served Kingman from 1906 to 63. This church is on the National Register of Historic Places and the number is 86001166.

It was evaluated for National Register listing as part of a 1985 study of 63 historic resources in Kingman that led to this and many others being listed.
