= House at 527 Pine =

Historic place in Arizona, United States

- U.S. National Register of Historic Places
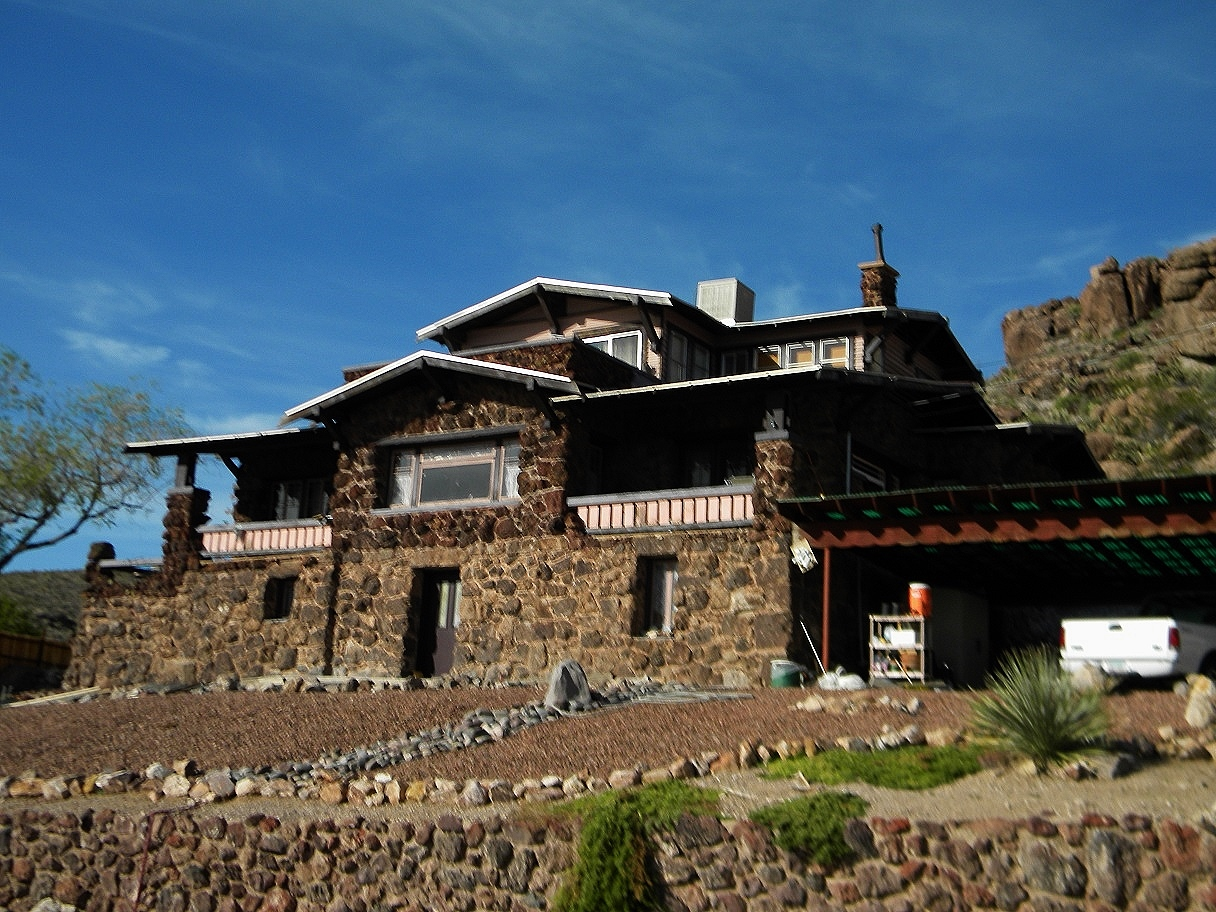

- Location within Arizona Location within the United States
- Location: 527 Pine St., Kingman, Arizona
- Coordinates: 35°11′31″N 114°2′55″W
- Built: 1917
- Architectural style: Bungalow/Craftsman
- MPS: Kingman MRA
- NRHP reference No.: 86001145
- Added to NRHP: May 14, 1986

The house at 527 Pine Street, Kingman, Arizona, is listed on the National Register of Historic Places. The house was built in 1917. The home is of the style of the Bungalow/Craftsman. The house was built with native stone. This home was built for Mr. Elliott's nephew. The home was considered an upper class. The nephew was very civic minded. During World War II, the home was used as the Jewish Religious Center for the Jewish Personnel of Kingman Army Air Field.

It was evaluated for National Register listing as part of a 1985 study of 63 historic resources in Kingman that led to this, and many others being listed.
