= Mrs. M. P. Sargent House =

Historic house in Arizona, United States

- U.S. National Register of Historic Places
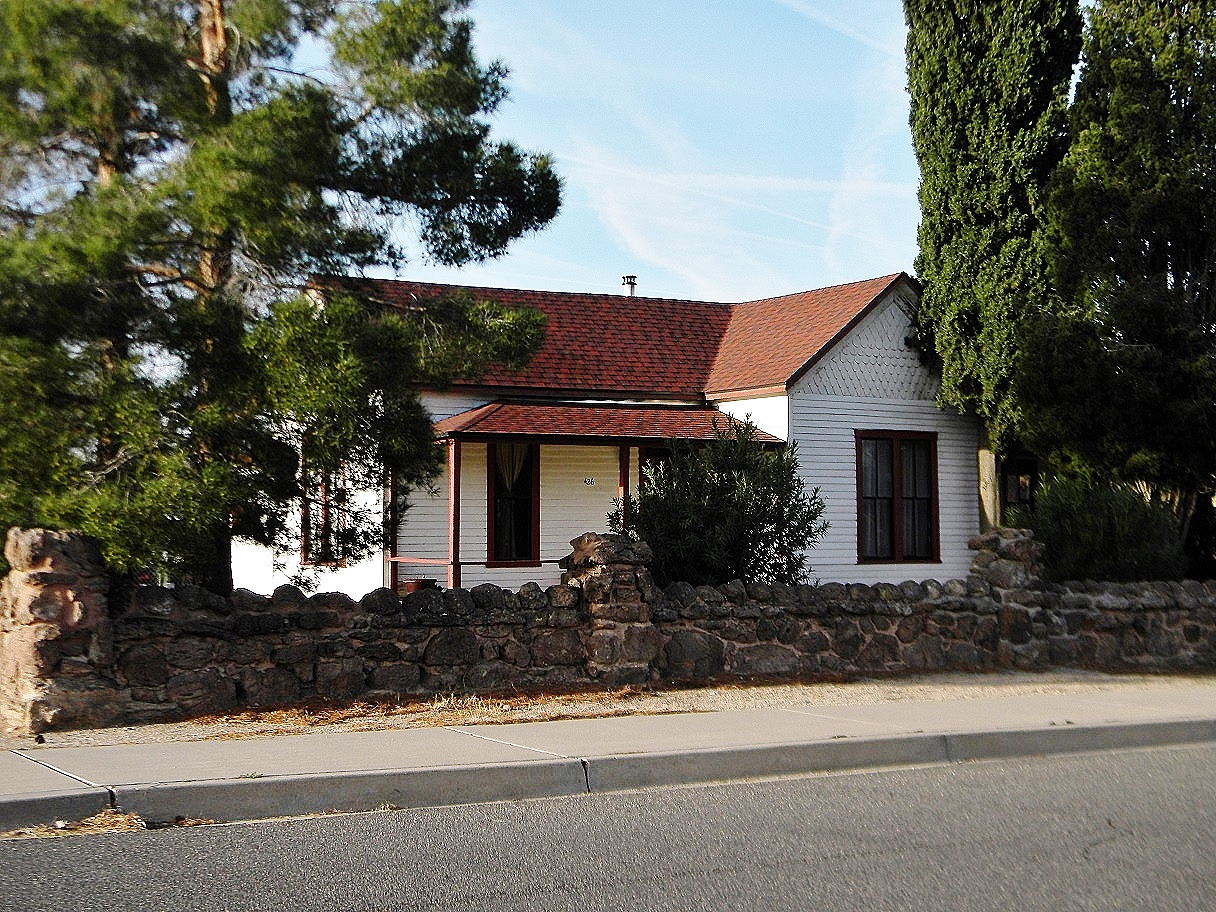

- Location within Arizona Location within the United States
- Location: 426 Topeka, Kingman, Arizona
- Coordinates: 35°11′14″N 114°3′4″W
- Area: less than one acre
- Built: 1897
- Architectural style: Queen Anne
- MPS: Kingman MRA
- NRHP reference No.: 86001167
- Added to NRHP: May 14, 1986

Mrs. M. P. Sargent House is located at 426 Topeka Street in Kingman, Arizona. The house was built in 1897. The home is of Queen Anne style. The house was added to the National Register of Historic Places on May 14, 1986, and its number is 86001167.

It was evaluated for National Register listing as part of a 1985 study of 63 historic resources in Kingman that led to this and many others being listed.
