= Building at 218 Spring =

United States historic place in Kingman, Arizona

- U.S. National Register of Historic Places
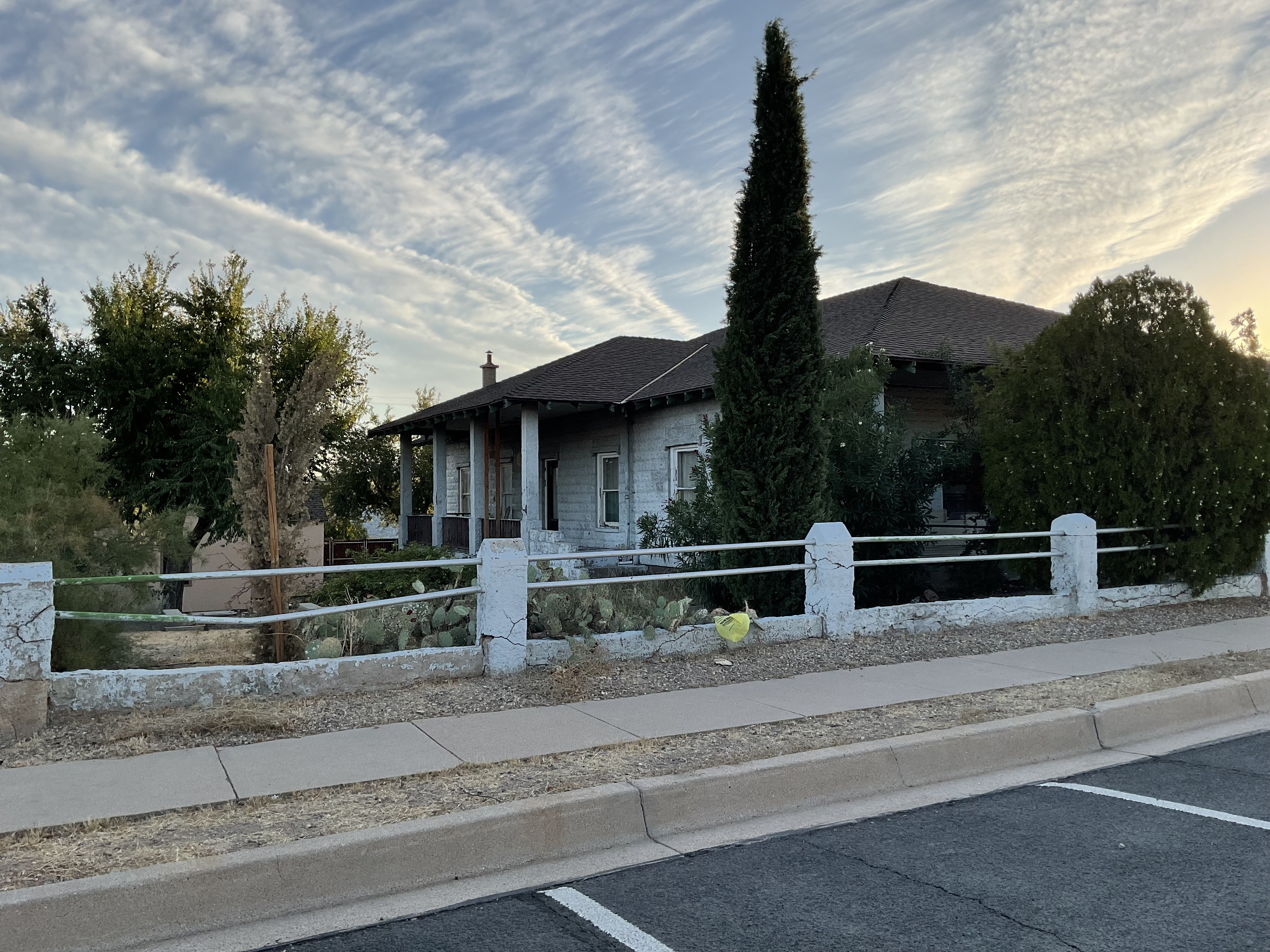
- The building in 2024

- Location within Arizona Location within the United States
- Location: 218 Spring St., Kingman, Arizona
- Coordinates: 35°11′29″N 114°3′15″W
- Built: 1917
- Architectural style: Bungalow/Craftsman
- MPS: Kingman MRA
- NRHP reference No.: 86001117
- Added to NRHP: May 14, 1986

The building at 218 Spring Street is a Bungalow/Craftsman-style apartment house located in Kingman, Arizona. It is listed on the National Register of Historic Places. It was evaluated for National Register listing as part of a 1985 study of 63 historic resources in Kingman that led to this and many others being listed.

== Description ==
218 Spring Street in Kingman, Arizona was built around 1917 in the Bungalow/Craftsman style, during the 1910s growth period. The building is a multi-residential or apartment house and is an investment or rental property. The major owner is unknown. The building was added to the National Register of Historic Places in 1986.
