= Peach Springs Trading Post =

- U.S. National Register of Historic Places
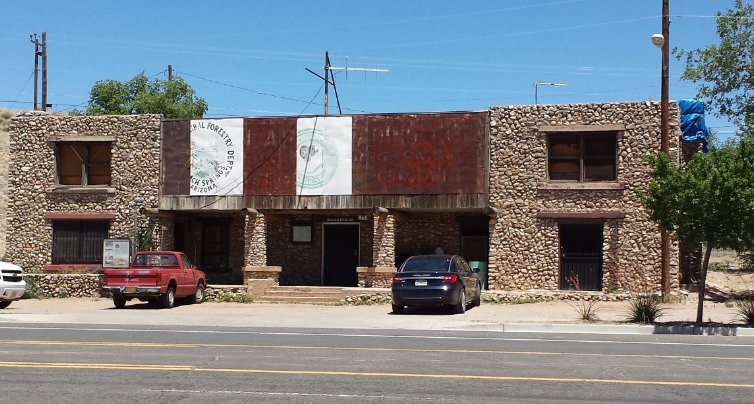

- Location within Arizona Location within the United States
- Location: 863 W. AZ 66, Peach Springs, Arizona
- Coordinates: 35°31′44″N 113°25′37″W
- Area: less than one acre
- Built: 1928
- Built by: Davis, Cecil
- Architectural style: Pueblo
- NRHP reference No.: 03001196
- Added to NRHP: November 21, 2003

The Peach Springs Trading Post, at 863 W AZ 66 in Peach Springs, Arizona, is a historic building built in 1928. It was built by Cecil Davis and includes Pueblo Revival architecture. It has served as a post office and a general store and also as a dwelling. It was listed on the National Register of Historic Places in 2003.

In 2003, it was owned by the Hualapai Indian Nation.

A 1936 postcard image depicts young men on horseback in front of the post, with a swastika in the signage of the post in the background.
