= Bighorn Cave =

- U.S. National Register of Historic Places
- Nearest city: Oatman, Arizona
- Area: less than one acre
- NRHP reference No.: 88001571
- Added to NRHP: September 28, 1988

Bighorn Cave, in Mohave County, Arizona near Oatman, is an archeological site that was listed on the National Register of Historic Places in 1988. It has also been listed as archeological site AZ F:15:1 (BLM) and as NA 18,616 (Museum of Northern Arizona).

It is located in the Black Mountains in west-central Arizona. Humans occupied the site during a 3,000 year period.
