= Oatman (surname) =

Oatman is a surname. Notable people with the surname include:

- Billy Oatman (1965–2023), left-handed American ten-pin bowler and a member of the Professional Bowlers Association
- Eddie Oatman (1889–1973), Canadian professional ice hockey player
- Mary Ann Oatman (1844–1851), the sister of Olive Oatman, and a survivor of abuse by the Yavapai people
- Olive Oatman (1837–1903), woman from Illinois who was famously abducted by a Native American tribe
- Russell Oatman (1905–1964), Canadian professional ice hockey player
