= Lovin and Withers Cottages =

United States historic place in Kingman, Arizona

- U.S. National Register of Historic Places
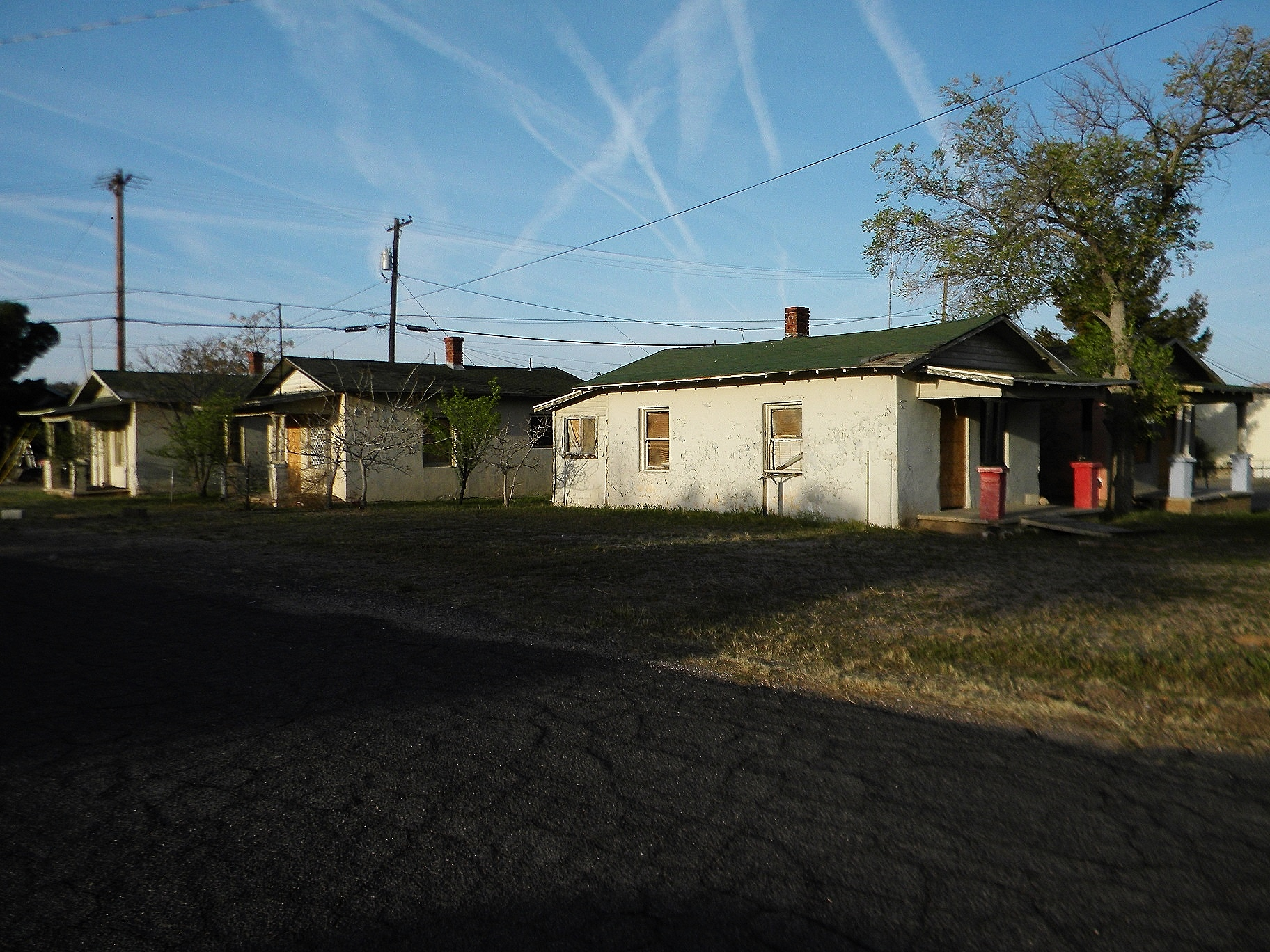

- Location within Arizona Location within the United States
- Location: Corner of Eighth and Topeka Streets; Kingman, Arizona
- Coordinates: 35°11′10″N 114°2′44″W
- Built: 1916
- Architect: Lovin & Withers, Inc.
- Architectural style: Bungalow/Craftsman
- MPS: Kingman MRA
- NRHP reference No.: 86001159
- Added to NRHP: May 14, 1986

Lovin and Withers Cottages are a complex of five Bungalow/Craftsman style cottages located in Kingman, Arizona. The cottages are listed on the National Register of Historic Places.

== Description ==
Lovin and Withers Cottages are located at the corner of Eighth and Topeka Streets in Kingman, Arizona. The five cottages were built in 1916 in the style Bungalow/Craftsman style. The five cottages are investment property, back then rentals were known as investments. There are five workers’ cottages as a complex. The five cottages were added to the National Register of Historic Places in 1986.

It was evaluated for National Register listing as part of a 1985 study of 63 historic resources in Kingman that led to this and many others being listed.
