= Foster S. Dennis House =

Historic house in Arizona, United States

- U.S. National Register of Historic Places
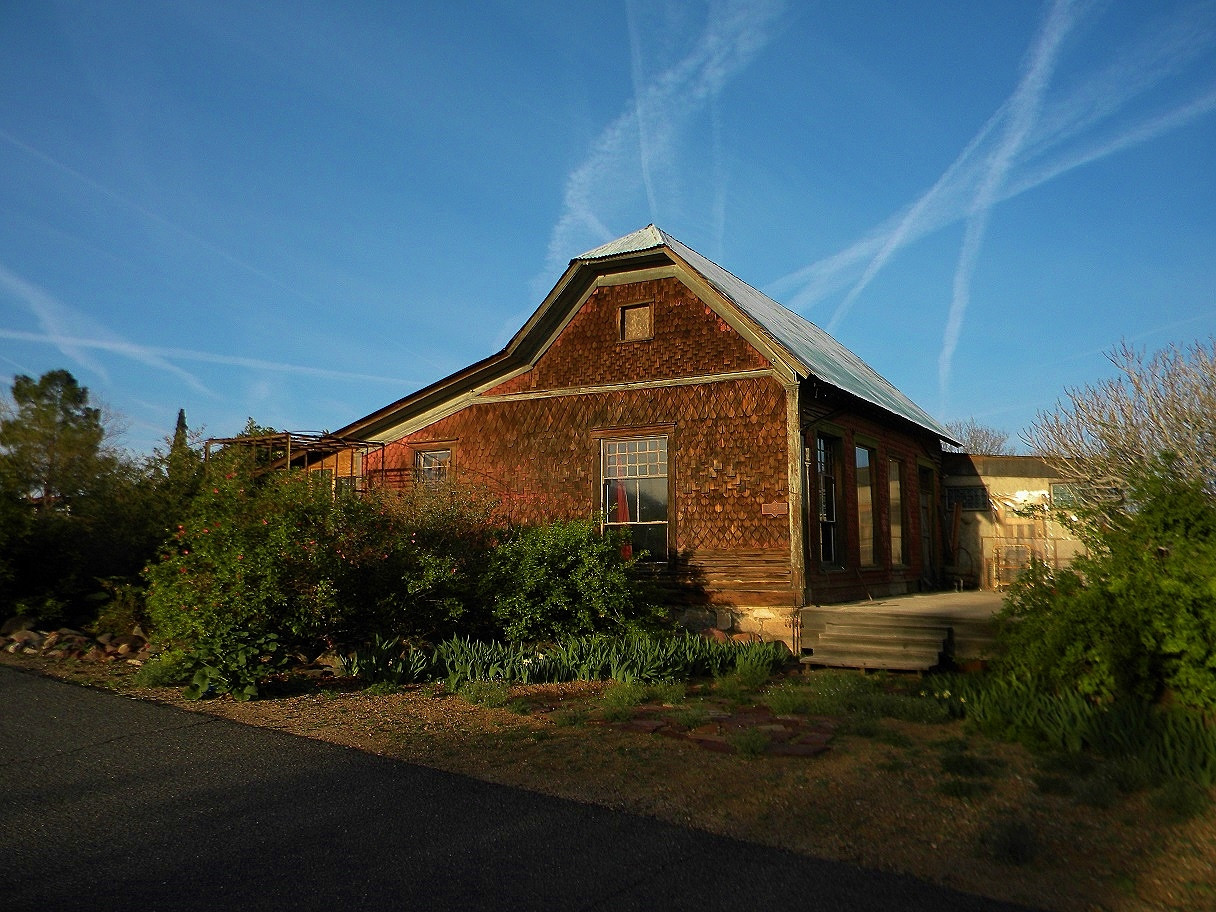

- Location within Arizona Location within the United States
- Location: Second and Park Streets; Kingman, Arizona
- Coordinates: 35°11′14″N 114°3′21″W
- Built: 1889
- Architectural style: Queen Anne
- MPS: Kingman MRA
- NRHP reference No.: 86001119
- Added to NRHP: May 14, 1986

The Foster S. Dennis House is a Queen Anne style house located in Kingman, Arizona. The house is listed on the National Register of Historic Places. It was evaluated for National Register listing as part of a 1985 study of 63 historic resources in Kingman that led to this and many others being listed.

== Description ==
The Foster S. Dennis House is located at corner of Second and Park Streets in Kingman, Arizona. The home was built in 1889 in Queen Anne Style architecture. There are shingles on the adobe. Mr. Dennis came to Arizona in 1883 as a miner. He set up a pipeline for water to Kingman from Beale Springs. He was Mohave County Treasurer for several terms and served in the Arizona Territorial Legislature for 1891–92. This house is on the National Register of Historic Places in 1986.
