= House at 105 Spring St. =

United States historic place in Kingman, Arizona

- U.S. National Register of Historic Places
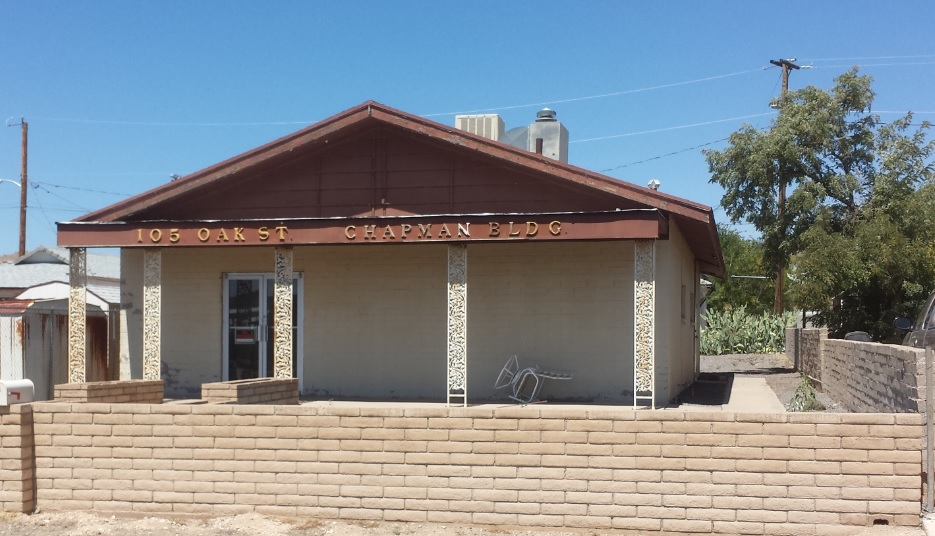

- Location within Arizona Location within the United States
- Location: 105 Spring St., Kingman, Arizona
- Coordinates: 35°11′32″N 114°3′25″W
- Built: 1911
- Architectural style: Bungalow/Craftsman
- MPS: Kingman MRA
- NRHP reference No.: 86001143
- Added to NRHP: May 14, 1986

The House at 105 Spring Street is a Bungalow/Craftsman style house located in Kingman, Arizona. The house is listed on the National Register of Historic Places. It was evaluated for National Register listing as part of a 1985 study of 63 historic resources in Kingman that led to this and many others being listed.

== Description ==
The house was built around 1911 by Mary Eleanor Cohenour, former wife of Jacob Neff Cohenour, Mohave County Sheriff and Postmaster during the 1880s. Mrs. Cohenour developed the Pleasant View addition to downtown Kingman, building her own home at the base point of the development in 1911. The home is in the Bungalow/Craftsman design. Mrs. Cohenour is also noted for having been the first woman to pilot her own automobile from Kingman to Signal, Arizona in 1928. (She was a very successful businesswoman, as well. The house has 4/1 lite double hung wood frame windows, porch columns and foundation done in native stone, lintels and sills in concrete. The house was added to the National Register of Historic Places in 1986. The house is also registered with the Arizona State Historic Buildings registry. The house shown in the Wikipedia image is NOT the house, obviously, since it clearly states the address as 105 Oak Street. As the current owners of 105 Spring, I can attest that it looks nothing like our house.
