= Lefever House =

Historic house in Arizona, United States

- U.S. National Register of Historic Places
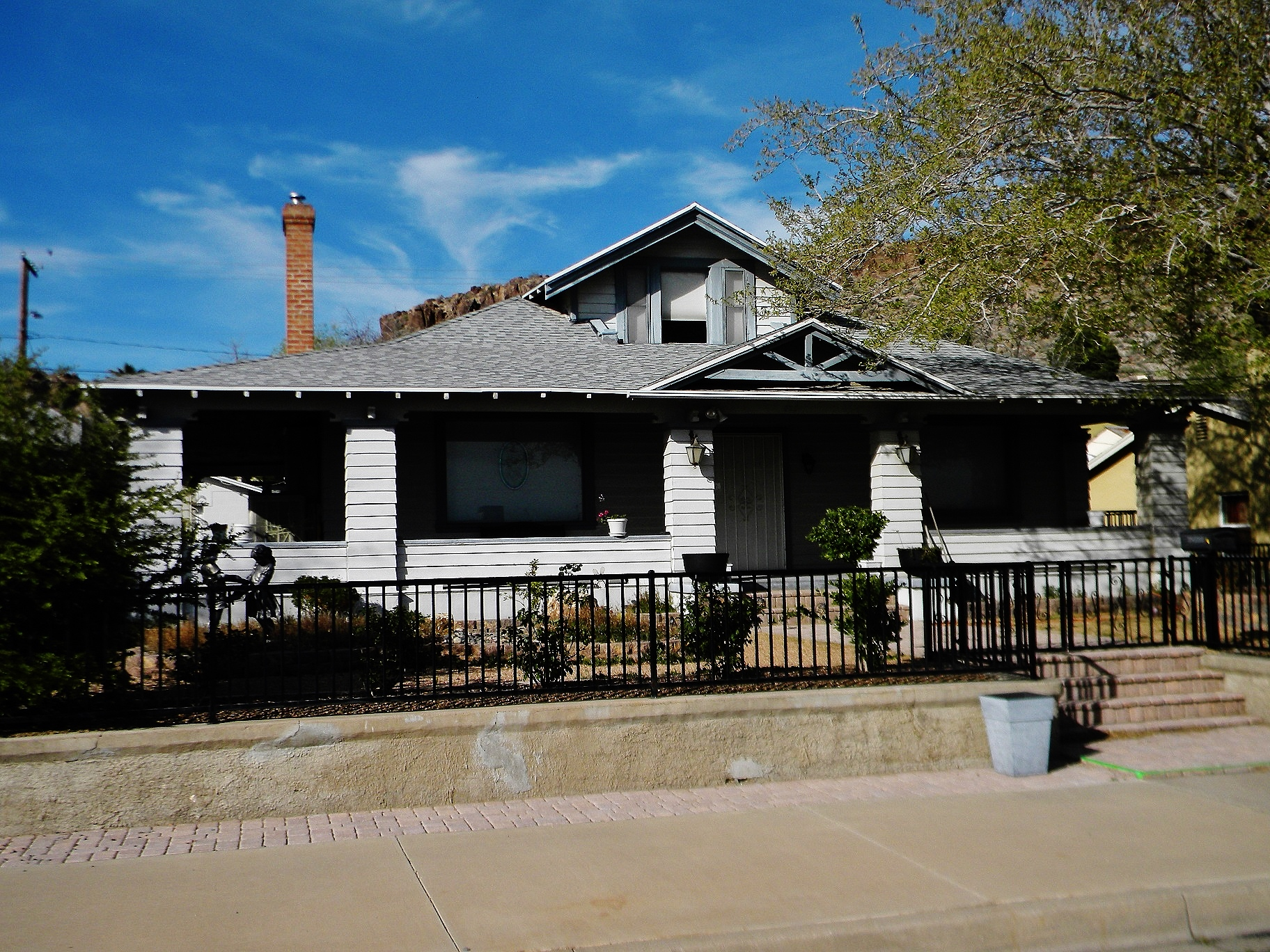

- Location within Arizona Location within the United States
- Location: 525 East Oak Street; Kingman, Arizona
- Coordinates: 35.1906°N 114.0492°W
- Built: 1900
- Architectural style: Bungalow/Craftsman
- MPS: Kingman MRA
- NRHP reference No.: 86001162
- Added to NRHP: May 14, 1986

Lefever House is a Bungalow/Craftsman style house located in Kingman, Arizona. The house is listed on the National Register of Historic Places.

== Description ==
Lefever House was built around 1900 and is of the Bungalow/Craftsman style. The home is one of the oldest wood-frame home in the city. Mr. Lefever was the Mohave County Recorder starting in 1898. The home was added to the National Register of Historic Places in 1996.

It was evaluated for National Register listing as part of a 1985 study of 63 historic resources in Kingman that led to this and many others being listed.
