= Little Red School (Kingman, Arizona) =

- U.S. National Register of Historic Places
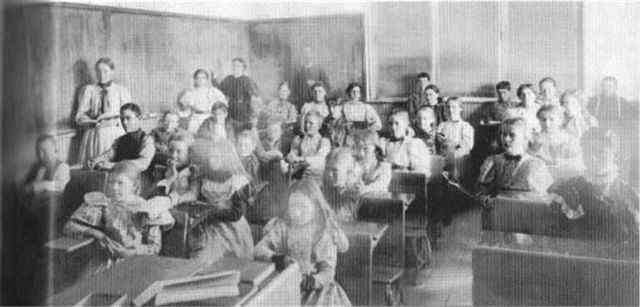
- Students inside the Little Red School

- Location within Arizona Location within the United States
- Location: 219 North Fourth Street, Kingman, Arizona, USA
- Coordinates: 35°11′25″N 114°3′8″W
- Built: 1896
- Architect: Hartley, Cooper & Hines
- Architectural style: Queen Anne
- MPS: Kingman MRA
- NRHP reference No.: 86001156
- Added to NRHP: May 14, 1986

The Little Red School is a former school building located in Kingman, Arizona, that was listed on the National Register of Historic Places on May 14, 1986.

The Little Red School is located at 219 Fourth Street in Kingman, Arizona. The building was constructed for the Kingman Elementary School District in 1896 in the Queen Anne style, with the firm Hartley, Cooper & Hines recorded as the architects or builders or both. It replaced an earlier school building, Kingman's first, and remained in use until 1928. Actor Andy Devine was an alumnus of the school.

After the closure of the school the building hosted the activities of several local groups. Kingman's Catholic community met there until the construction of St. Mary's church, and the Christian Science Church and the Elks Lodge used the building at various periods. During World War II the Ration Board operated out of the schoolhouse. After the war Kingman's Chamber of Commerce briefly used the building as their office, sharing it with the Public Library. After the library outgrew the premises the building came under the ownership of the City of Kingman; it is today the city's Magistrate's Office.

The building was mentioned in a survey of historic properties in Kingman.

== See also ==
- National Register of Historic Places listings in Mohave County, Arizona
