= J. B. Wright House =

United States historic place in Kingman, Arizona

- U.S. National Register of Historic Places
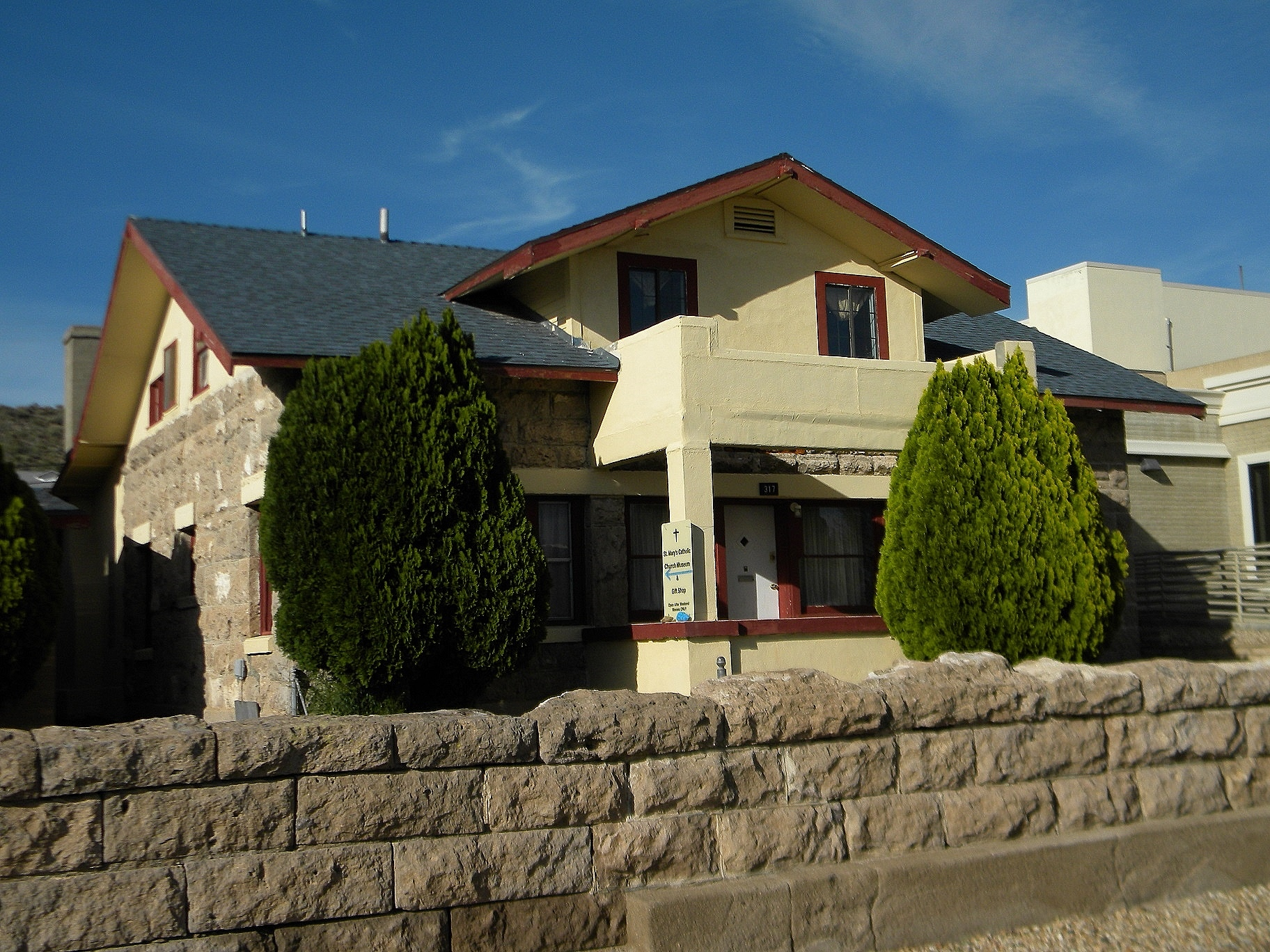

- Location within Arizona Location within the United States
- Location: 317 Spring Street, Kingman, Arizona
- Coordinates: 35°11′30″N 114°3′9″W
- Built: 1912
- Architectural style: Colonial Revival
- MPS: Kingman MRA
- NRHP reference No.: 86001178
- Added to NRHP: May 14, 1986

J. B. Wright House is a historic house in Kingman, Arizona. The house was built in 1912 in the Neo-Colonial Revival style. The house was built with native stone. The house is next door to the Mohave County Court House. Mr. Wright was a civil engineer and contractor, who help in building the Mohave County Court House 1914–15. He owned the house until his death in 1944. The house is on the National Register of Historic Places.

It was evaluated for National Register listing as part of a 1985 study of 63 historic resources in Kingman that led to this and many others being listed.
