= House at 536 Park =

United States historic place in Kingman, Arizona

- U.S. National Register of Historic Places
- Location within Arizona Location within the United States
- Location: 536 Park Street; Kingman, Arizona
- Coordinates: 35°11′9″N 114°2′58″W
- Built: 1906
- Architectural style: Bungalow/Craftsman
- MPS: Kingman MRA
- NRHP reference No.: 86001146
- Added to NRHP: May 14, 1986

The house at 536 Park Street is a Bungalow/Craftsman style house located in Kingman, Arizona. The house is listed on the National Register of Historic Places. It was evaluated for National Register listing as part of a 1985 study of 63 historic resources in Kingman that led to this and many others being listed.

== Description ==
The house at 536 Park Street in Kingman, Arizona was built around 1906 in the Bungalow/Craftsman style as another south side home for the workers. The house was added to the National Register of Historic Places in 1986.
