= House at 519 Golconda =

United States historic place in Kingman, Arizona

- U.S. National Register of Historic Places
- Location within Arizona Location within the United States
- Location: Kingman, Arizona
- Coordinates: 35°11′8″N 114°3′1″W
- Built: 1897
- MPS: Kingman MRA
- NRHP reference No.: 86001148
- Added to NRHP: May 14, 1986

The house at 519 Golconda Avenue is a cottage located in Kingman, Arizona. It is listed on the National Register of Historic Places. It was evaluated for National Register listing as part of a 1985 study of 63 historic resources in Kingman that led to this and many others being listed.

== Description ==
The house at 519 Golconda Avenue in Kingman, Arizona was built in 1897. The house is an indigenous cottage. This is another south side home across the railroad track. This house was a typical workers' home. The house is on the National Register of Historical Places in 1986.
