= G. H. Sullivan Lodging House =

United States historic place in Kingman, Arizona

- U.S. National Register of Historic Places
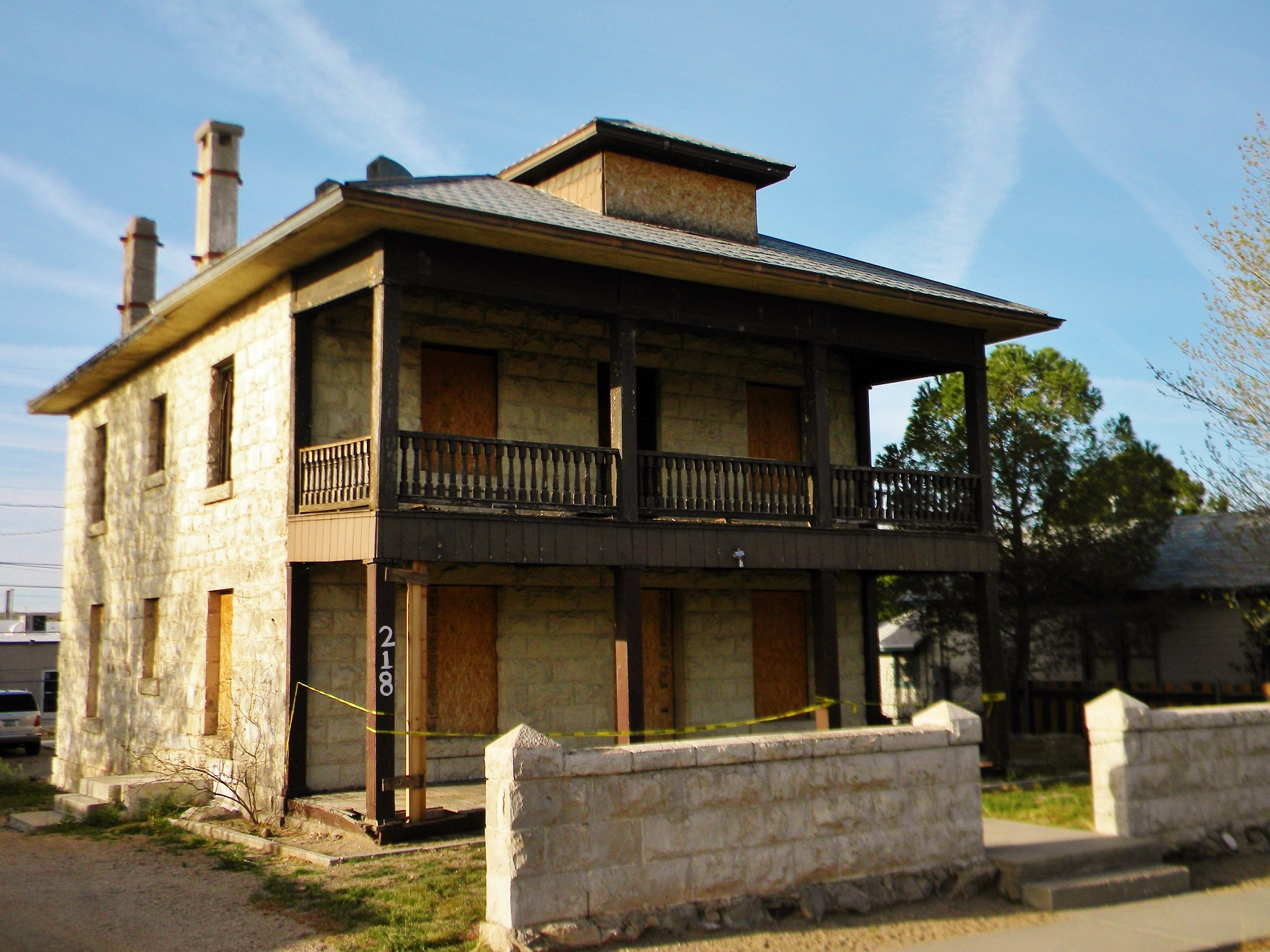

- Location within Arizona Location within the United States
- Location: 218 Oak Street; Kingman, Arizona
- Coordinates: 35°11′26″N 114°3′16″W
- Built: 1911
- Architect: Gruninger & Sons
- Architectural style: Colonial Revival
- MPS: Kingman MRA
- NRHP reference No.: 86001168
- Added to NRHP: May 14, 1986

G. H. Sullivan Lodging House is a Colonial Revival style building located in Kingman, Arizona.

== Description ==
G. H. Sullivan Lodging House is located at 218 Oak Street in Kingman, Arizona. The building was built by Gruninger & Sons starting in 1907 in the Colonial Revival style. It was completed in 1911. The native stone came from Metcalfe Quarry. The building was an investment property for Mr. Sullivan, who was an early developer of Kingman. The building was added to the National Register of Historic Places in 1986.

It was evaluated for National Register listing as part of a 1985 study of 63 historic resources in Kingman that led to this and many others being listed.
