= Horse Valley Ranch =

- U.S. National Register of Historic Places
- Drawing of the ranch

- Location within Arizona Location within the United States
- Nearest city: Littlefield, Arizona
- Coordinates: 36°7′2″N 113°30′5″W
- Area: 28.5 acres (11.5 ha)
- Built: 1916
- Built by: Waring, J. D. "Slim"
- NRHP reference No.: 84000781
- Added to NRHP: April 12, 1984

The Horse Valley Ranch, also known as Waring Ranch, near Littlefield, Arizona, dates from 1916. A 28.5-acre (11.5 ha) area of the ranch was listed on the National Register of Historic Places in 1984. The listing included two contributing buildings, two other contributing structures, and a contributing site. The ranch was acquired by the National Park Service in 1967-1968 and is now part of Grand Canyon–Parashant National Monument.
