= E. B. Williams House =

United States historic place in Kingman, Arizona

- U.S. National Register of Historic Places
- Location within Arizona Location within the United States
- Location: 531 Oak Street, Kingman, Arizona
- Coordinates: 35°11′26″N 114°2′59″W
- Built: 1887
- Architectural style: Queen Anne
- MPS: Kingman MRA
- NRHP reference No.: 86001177
- Added to NRHP: May 14, 1986

Ebenezeb B. Williams House is a historic house in Kingman, Arizona. The house was built in 1887. It is a Queen Anne style home. This is one of the earliest homes on Oak Street. Williams was the Mohave County Attorney in the 1880s. This house is on the National Register of Historic Places.

It was evaluated for National Register listing as part of a 1985 study of 63 historic resources in Kingman that led to this and many others being listed.
