= House at 809 Grand View =

United States historic place in Kingman, Arizona

- U.S. National Register of Historic Places
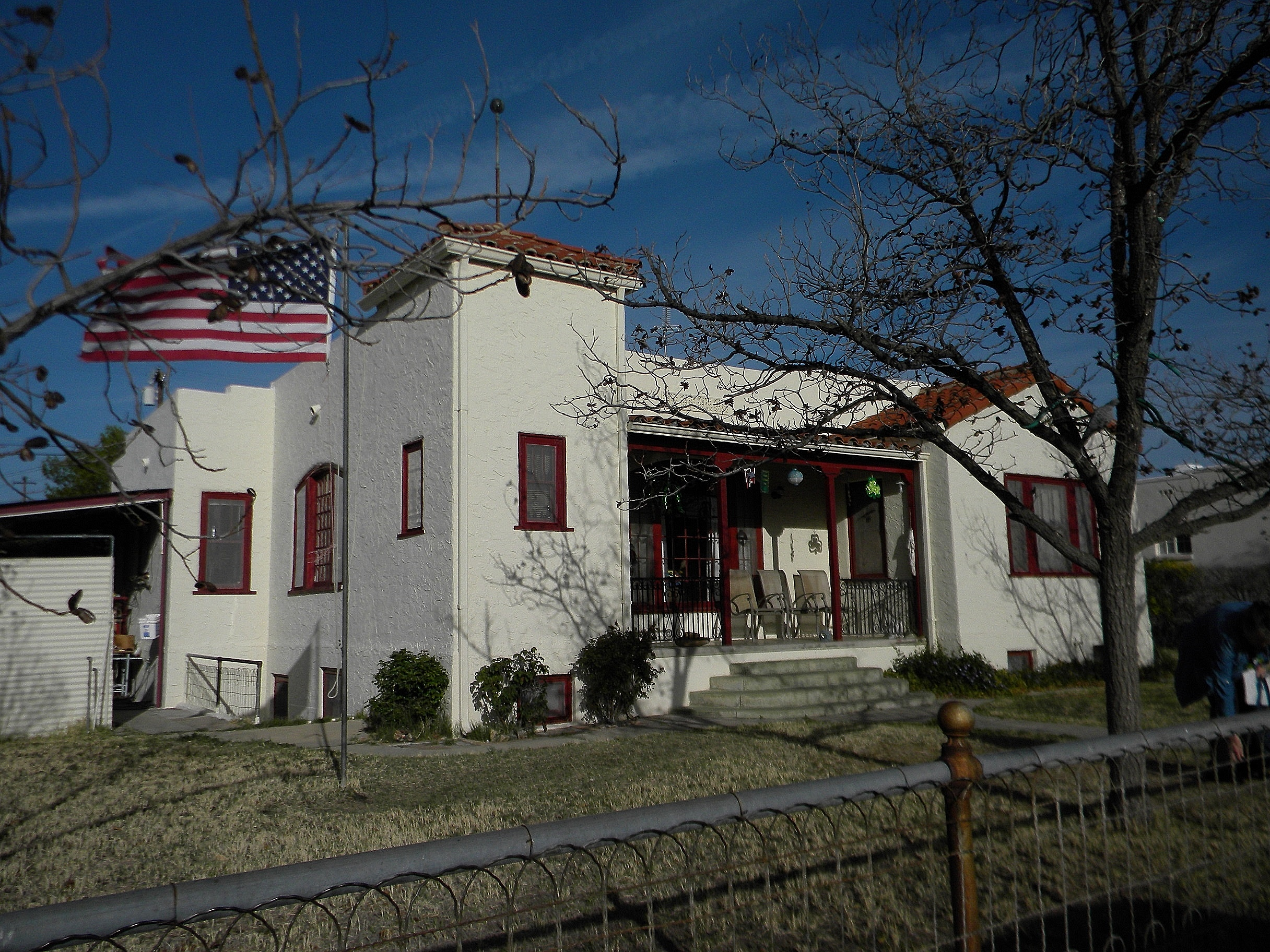

- Location within Arizona Location within the United States
- Location: 809 Grand View Avenue; Kingman, Arizona
- Coordinates: 35°11′46″N 114°3′39″W
- Built: 1923
- Architect: John Osterman
- Architectural style: Mission/Spanish Revival
- MPS: Kingman MRA
- NRHP reference No.: 86001144
- Added to NRHP: May 14, 1986

The house at 809 Grand View Avenue is a Mission/Spanish Revival style house located in Kingman, Arizona. It is listed on the National Register of Historic Places. It was evaluated for National Register listing as part of a 1985 study of 63 historic resources in Kingman that led to this and many others being listed.

== Description ==
The house on 809 Grand View Avenue in Kingman, Arizona was built around 1923 in the Mission/Spanish Revival style. John Osterman was the architect. He was a local contractor. The house is built in the new Metcalfe Addition of downtown Kingman, an early suburban area of Kingman. This represents the shift in home building in a new area of Kingman and expansion of the town. 809 Grand view is one of three homes at the time of Mission/Spanish Revival. The home has a square corner tower and recessed central entry. The house was added to the National Register of Historic Places in 1986.
