= Charles Ziemer House =

Historic house in Arizona, United States

- U.S. National Register of Historic Places
- Location within Arizona Location within the United States
- Location: 507 East Oak Street; Kingman, Arizona
- Coordinates: 35°11′26″N 114°3′0″W
- Built: 1898
- Architectural style: Colonial Revival
- MPS: Kingman MRA
- NRHP reference No.: 86001179
- Added to NRHP: May 14, 1986

The Charles Ziemer House is a Colonial Revival style house located in Kingman, Arizona. The house is listed on the National Register of Historic Places.

== Description ==
The Charles Ziemer House is located at 507 East Oak Street in Kingman, Arizona. It was built in 1898 in the Colonial Revival style and is on the National Register of Historic Places both for its architecture and its significance in the history of Kingman. The builder of the house, Charles Ziemer, was a local businessman and mine owner who lived in Kingman from at least 1886 to his death in 1902. The house is currently a private residence.
