= Durlin Hotel =

- U.S. National Register of Historic Places
- Location within Arizona Location within the United States
- Location: Main St., Oatman, Arizona
- Coordinates: 35°1′36″N 114°22′58″W
- Area: less than one acre
- Built: 1924
- Architectural style: Spanish Colonial Revival
- NRHP reference No.: 83002988
- Added to NRHP: August 25, 1983

The Durlin Hotel, which was renamed the Oatman Hotel, is located on Main St. in Oatman, Arizona, United States. It was built in 1924 by John Durlin and includes Spanish Colonial Revival architecture.

It was listed on the National Register of Historic Places in 1983. It is significant as the only two-story adobe building in Mohave County, Arizona, and for association with the gold mining era of Oatman.

== Images ==
Historic Oatman (Durlin) Hotel

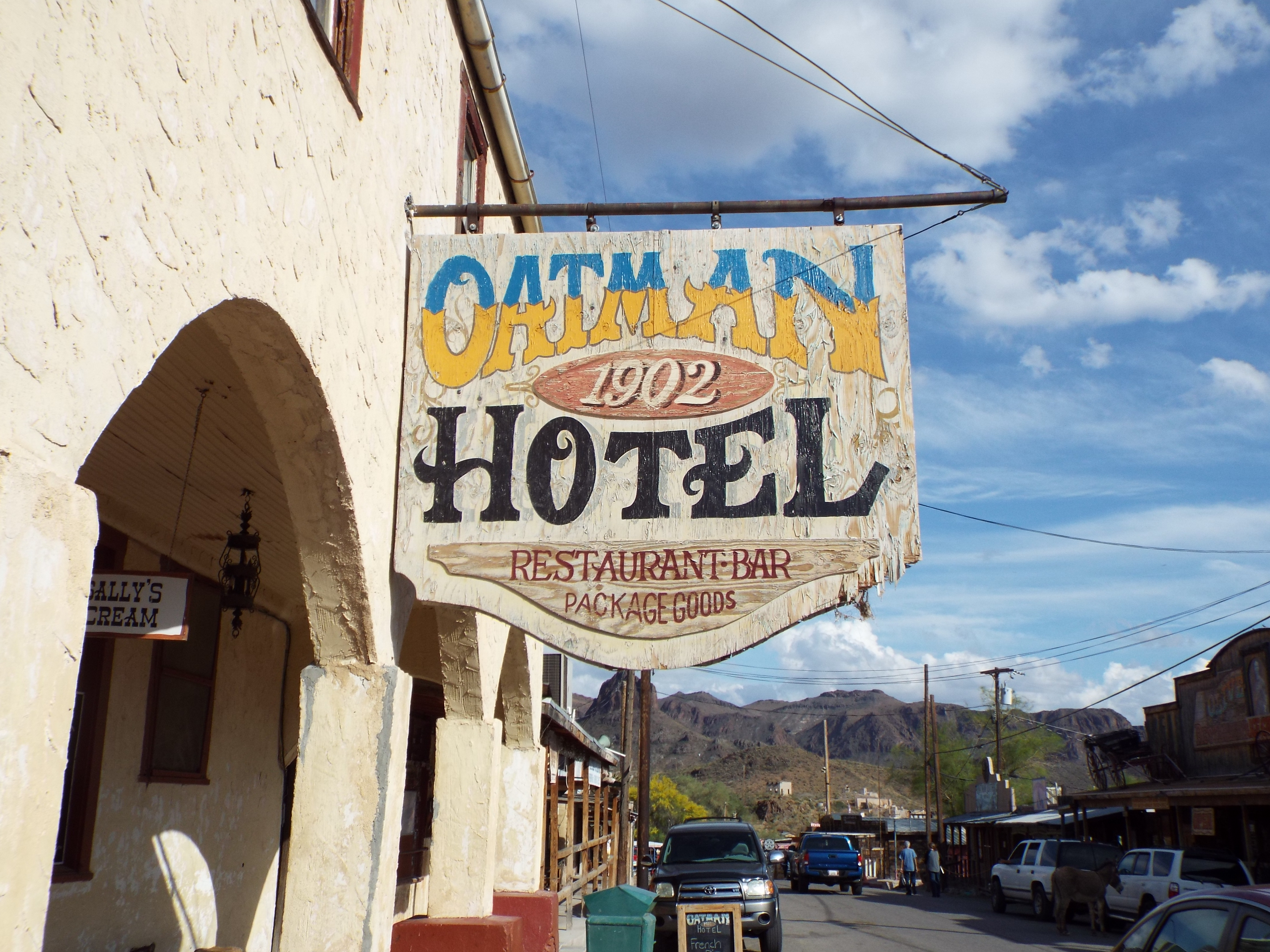
Oatman entrance sign

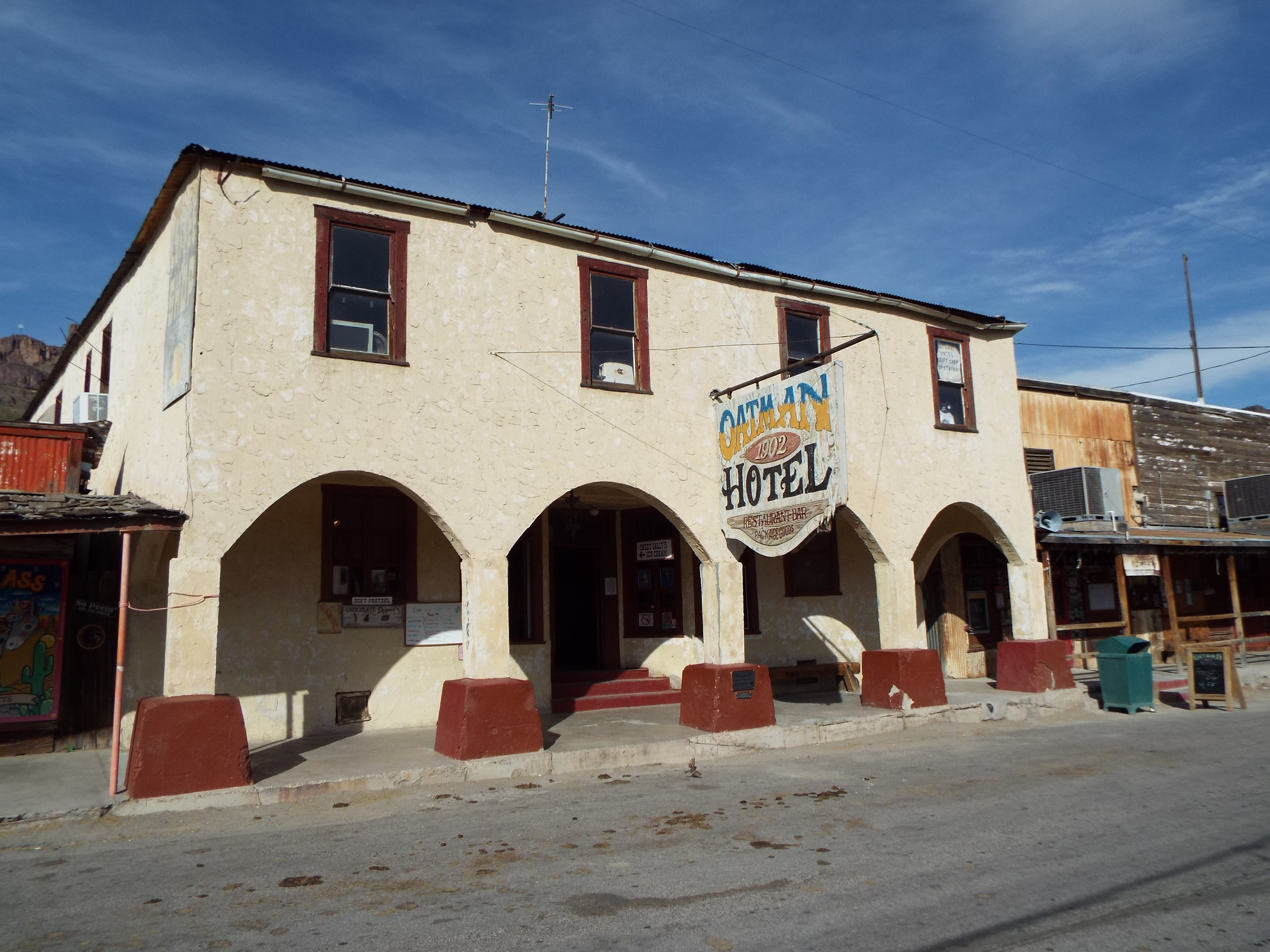
Oatman Hotel originally the Durlin Hotel built in 1902

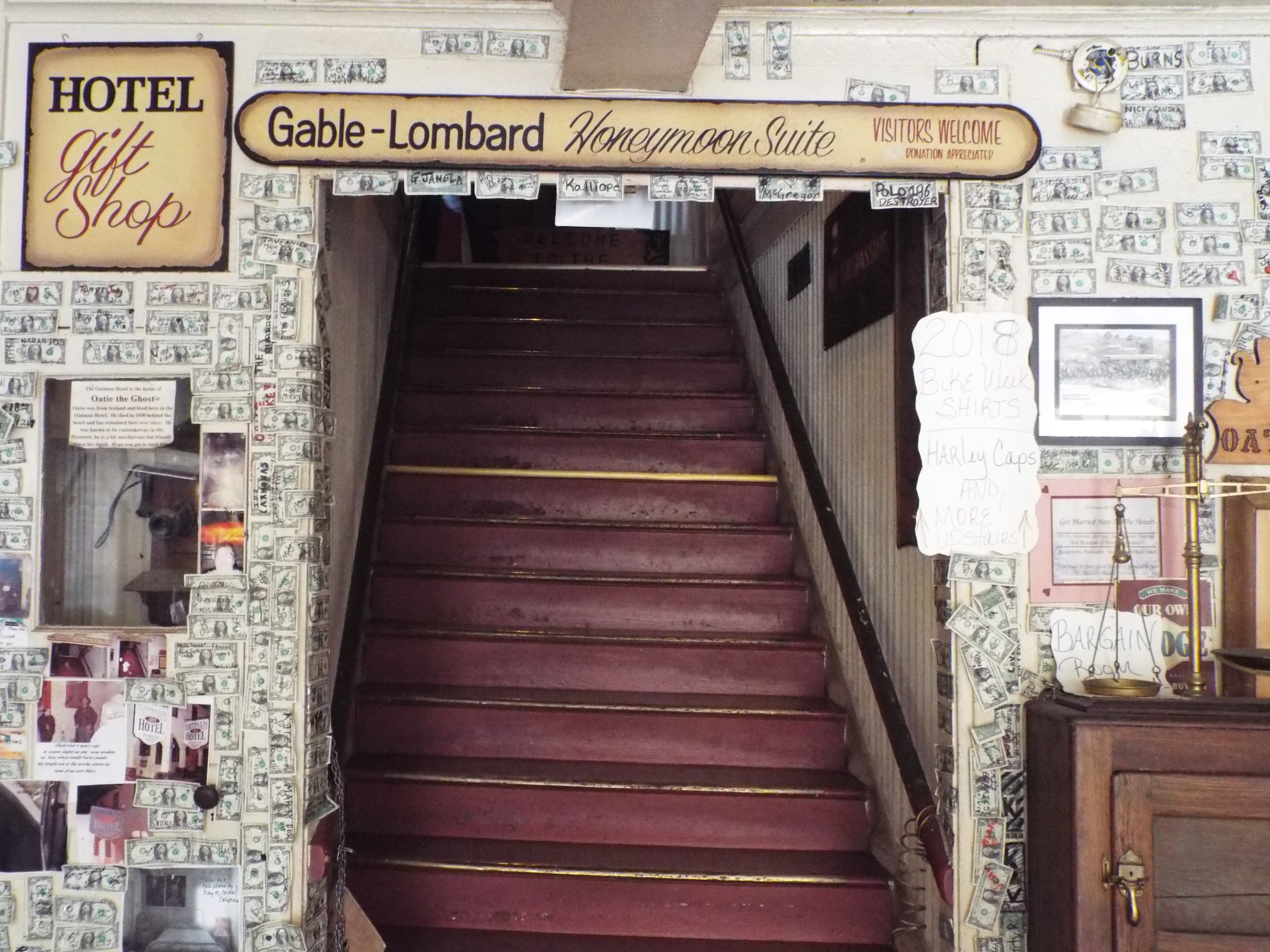
Inside the Oatman Hotel

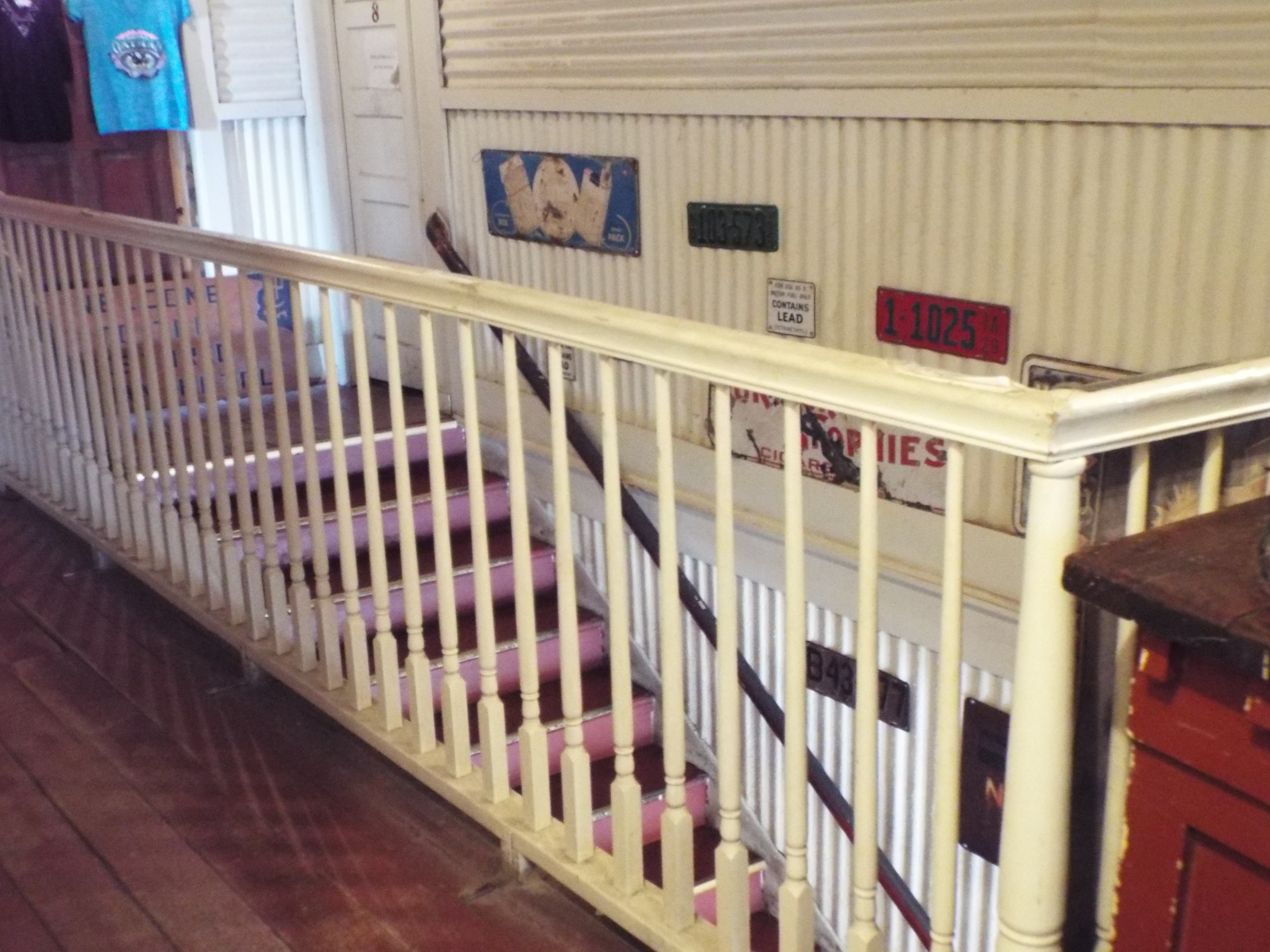
Second floor of the hotel

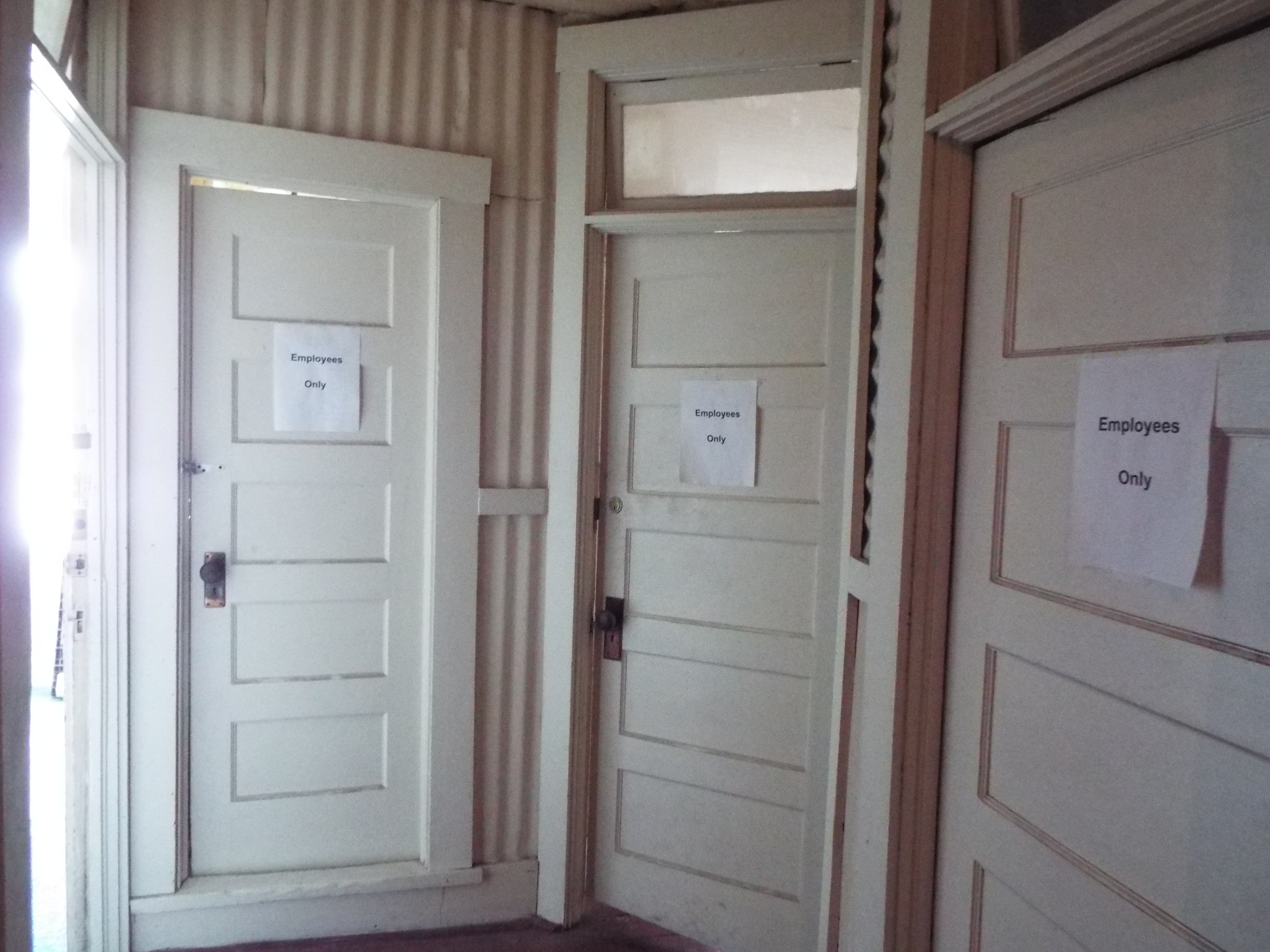
Hotel room doors on the second floor

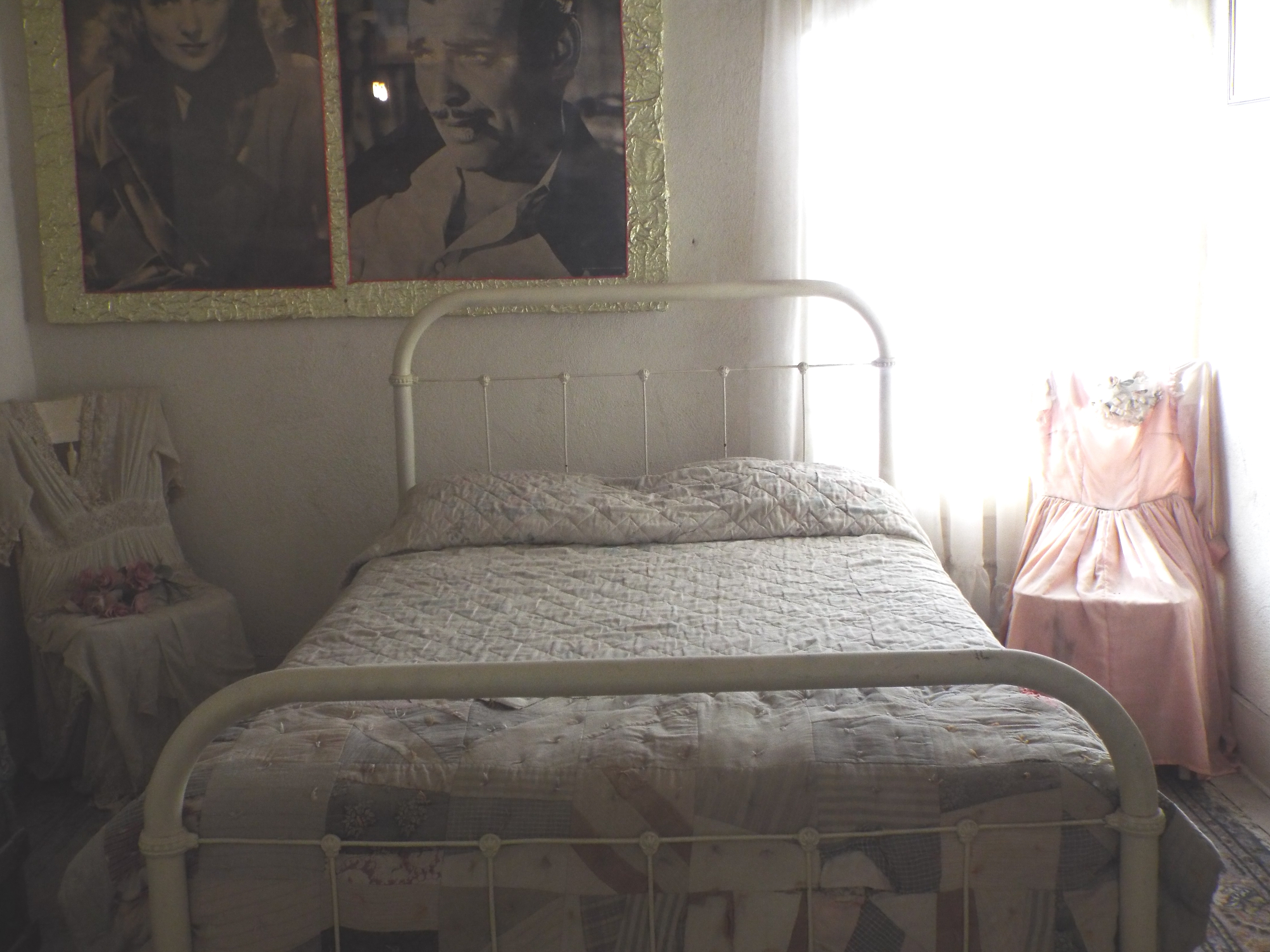
The Clark Gable and Carole Lombard honeymoon suite
