= Tyrell House =

Historic house in Arizona, United States

- U.S. National Register of Historic Places
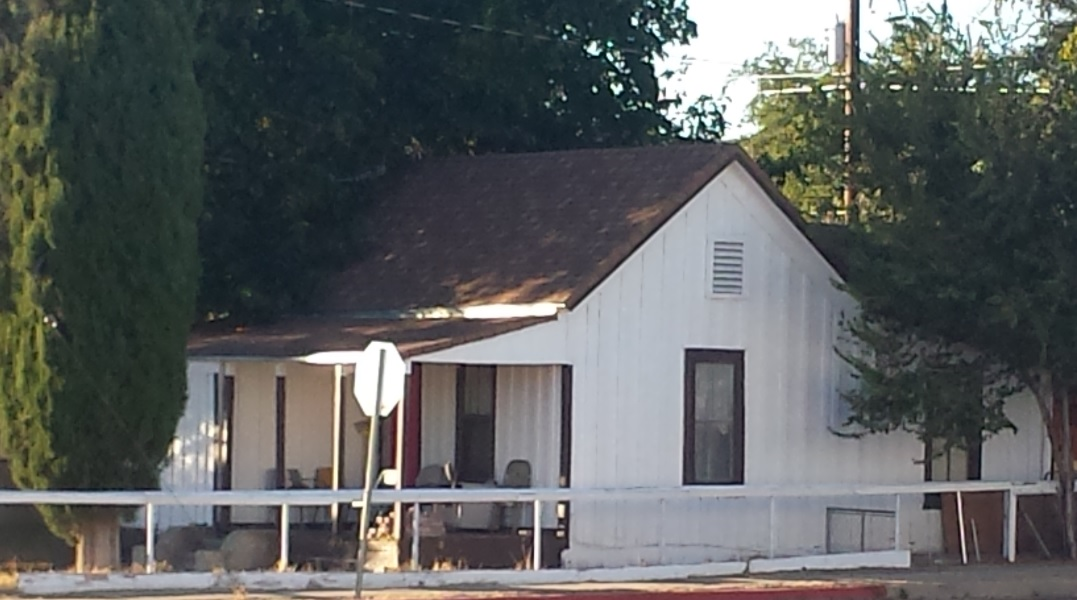

- Location within Arizona Location within the United States
- Location: 133 Beale St., Kingman, Arizona
- Coordinates: 35°11′41″N 114°3′30″W
- Built: 1897
- NRHP reference No.: 86001172
- Added to NRHP: May 14, 1986

Thomas Tyrell House is a historic house in Kingman, Arizona. The home was built in 1897 and is an indigenous cottage. Mr. Tyrell built this house and lived in there for two years. His main profession was a painter. The property also has a pump house. This is the first house to have indoor plumbing. The house is on the National Register of Historic Places, number 86001172.

It was evaluated for National Register listing as part of a 1985 study of 63 historic resources in Kingman that led to this and many others being listed.
