= W. A. Gruninger Building =

- U.S. National Register of Historic Places
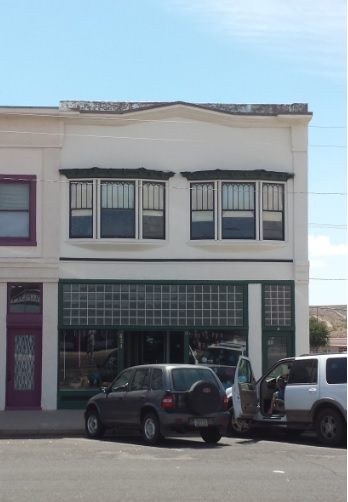

- Location within Arizona Location within the United States
- Location: 424 Beale Street; Kingman, Arizona
- Coordinates: 35°11′21″N 114°3′4″W
- Built: 1921
- Architect: W.A. Gruninger, & Son
- Architectural style: Early Commercial
- MPS: Kingman MRA
- NRHP reference No.: 86001141
- Added to NRHP: May 14, 1986

The W. A. Gruninger Building is a commercial building located in Kingman, Arizona. It was evaluated for National Register listing as part of a 1985 study of 63 historic resources in Kingman that led to this and many others being listed.

== Description ==
W. A. Gruninger Building is located at 424 Beale Street in Kingman, Arizona. The building was designed and built by Gruninger & Son in 1921 in an Early Commercial style. Gruninger & Son built it as an investment property. The first floor was a store front for rent. The second floor had office space. The Gruningers had their own office there. Today the building is still used for a store and office space for the downtown area of Kingman. The building was added to the National Register of Historic Places in 1986.

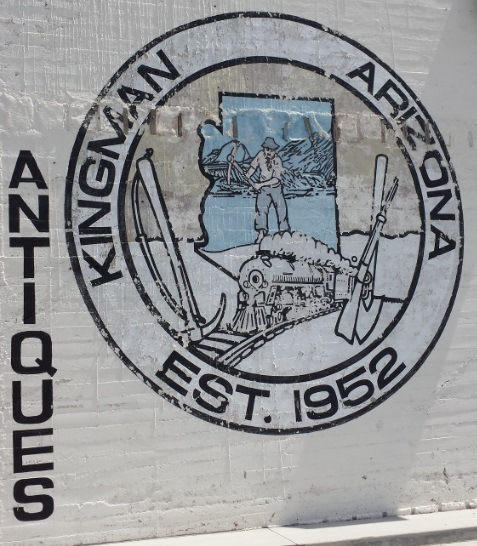
Mural on side of Gruninger building in kingman, az
