= Oatman Drug Company Building =

- U.S. National Register of Historic Places
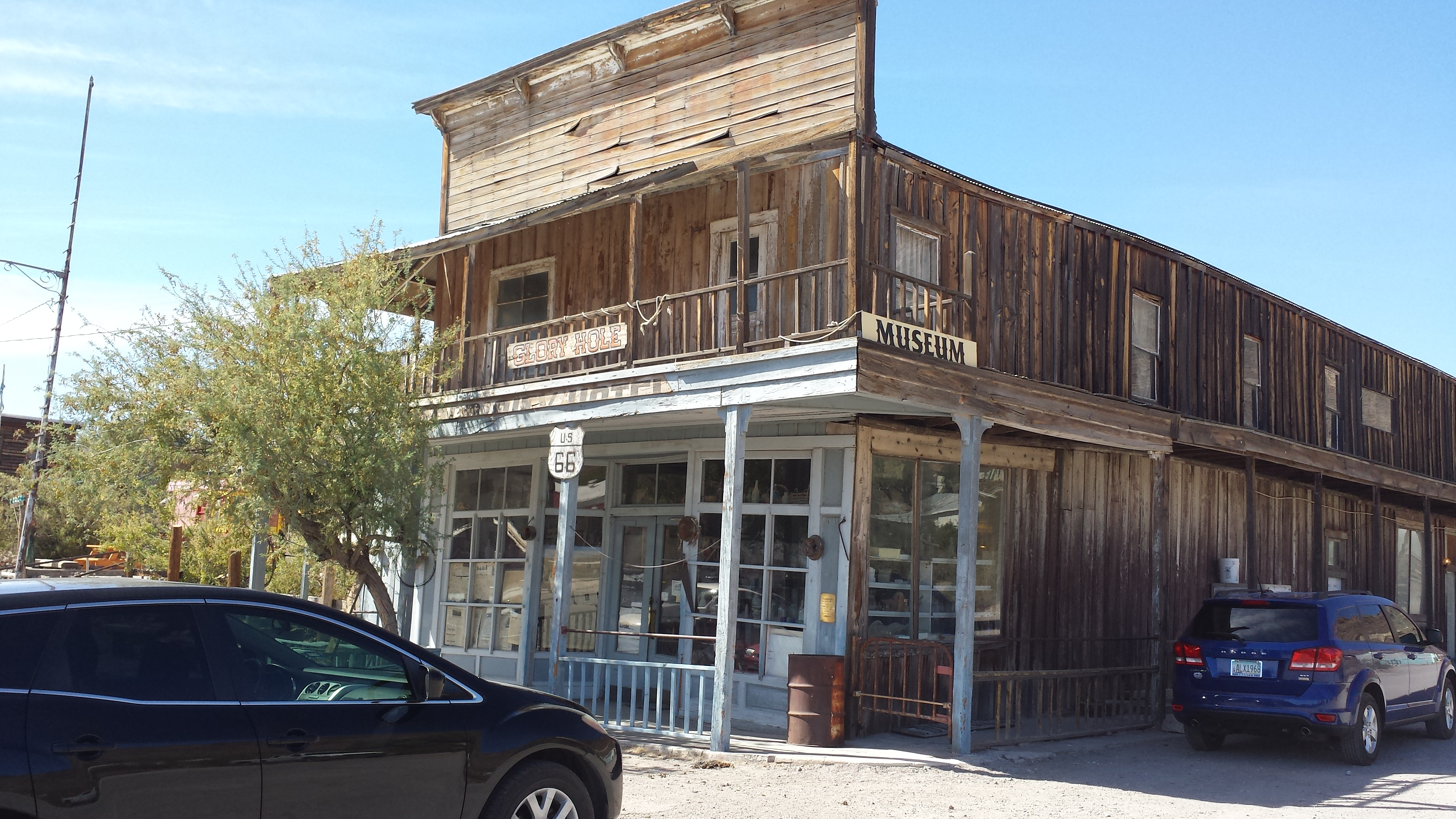

- Location within Arizona Location within the United States
- Location: 1 Main St., Oatman, Arizona
- Coordinates: 35°1′33″N 114°22′55″W
- Area: less than one acre
- Built: 1915
- Built by: Force, M.H.
- Architectural style: Western vernacular
- NRHP reference No.: 05001064
- Added to NRHP: April 6, 2006

The Oatman Drug Company Building, located at 1 Main St. in Oatman, Arizona, was built in 1915. It has been listed on the National Register of Historic Places since 2006. The building has served as a restaurant, as a drug/general store, as a medical business/office, as a professional building, and as a financial institution.

It is a 120-by-30-foot (36.6 m × 9.1 m) two-story false front building, at the eastern edge of Oatman near the locally noted "Elephant's Tooth" rock outcropping.

The building is significant for association with commercial activity—including historic Route 66 business in Oatman. It is one of few surviving buildings from Oatman's boom years, c. 1913–1934, since many buildings were destroyed in a 1921 fire.
