= Bonelli House =

United States historic place in Kingman, Arizona

- U.S. National Register of Historic Places
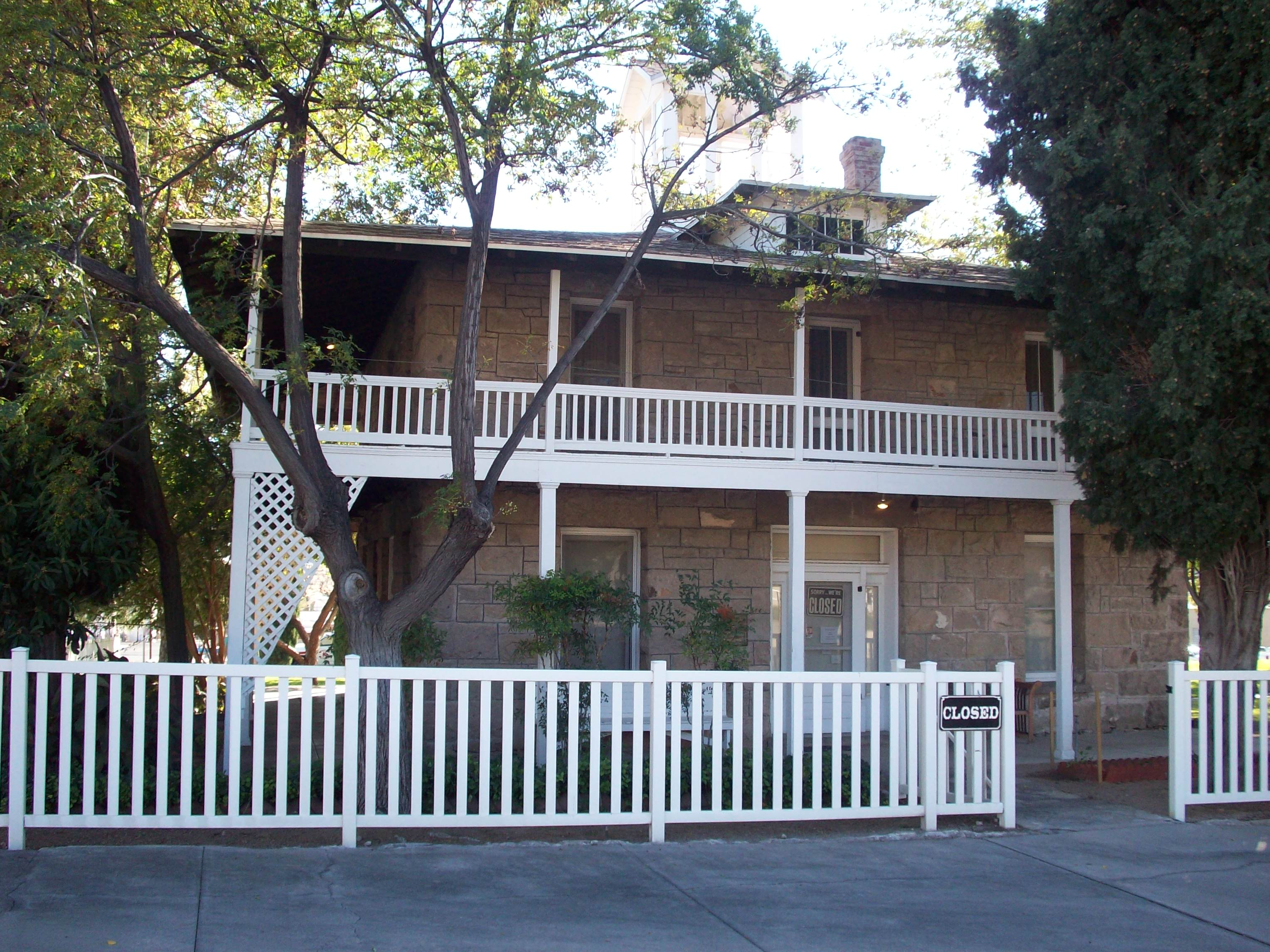

- Location within Arizona Location within the United States
- Interactive map showing the location of Bonelli House
- Location: Fifth and Spring Streets Kingman, Arizona
- Coordinates: 35.1913°N 114.0513°W
- Area: less than one acre
- Built: 1915
- MPS: Kingman MRA (AD)
- NRHP reference No.: 75000352
- Added to NRHP: April 24, 1975

Bonelli House is at the corner of Fifth and Spring Streets in Kingman, Arizona, United States. The house was built in October of 1915. It was evaluated for National Register listing as part of a 1985 study of 63 historic resources in Kingman that led to this and many others being listed.

== Construction ==
George Bonelli built the house in 1915 with local Peach Springs Tuff stone from Metcalfe Quarry. The home is two stories, rectangular, and has a low hipped-roof with dormers. The veranda on three sides is supported by square wooden pillars. The decorative front center entry door has a transom and sidelights. The house features interior chimneys, doors and tall windows for ventilation. The stone walls are 18- to 22-inches wide, with lathe-and-plaster interior. The early plumbing and wiring is intact but has been brought up to code and many original furnishings remain. This is Anglo-territorial-style architecture well suited for the desert climate.

== History ==
This was the second home and built on the same property but not same location; the original home burned down in January, 1915. The family raised nine children and ran four businesses in the area. In Kingman, the Bonellis owned a large ranch, a general store and jewelry store; about 20 miles to the northwest, the Bonelli family owned and operated a general store and meat market in Chloride, Arizona.

The property belongs to the City of Kingman and is operated as a historic house museum by the Mohave County Historical Society. The Society also operates the Mohave Museum of History and Arts and the AZ Route 66 Museum.
