= Mohave Museum of History and Arts =

Museum in Kingman, Arizona

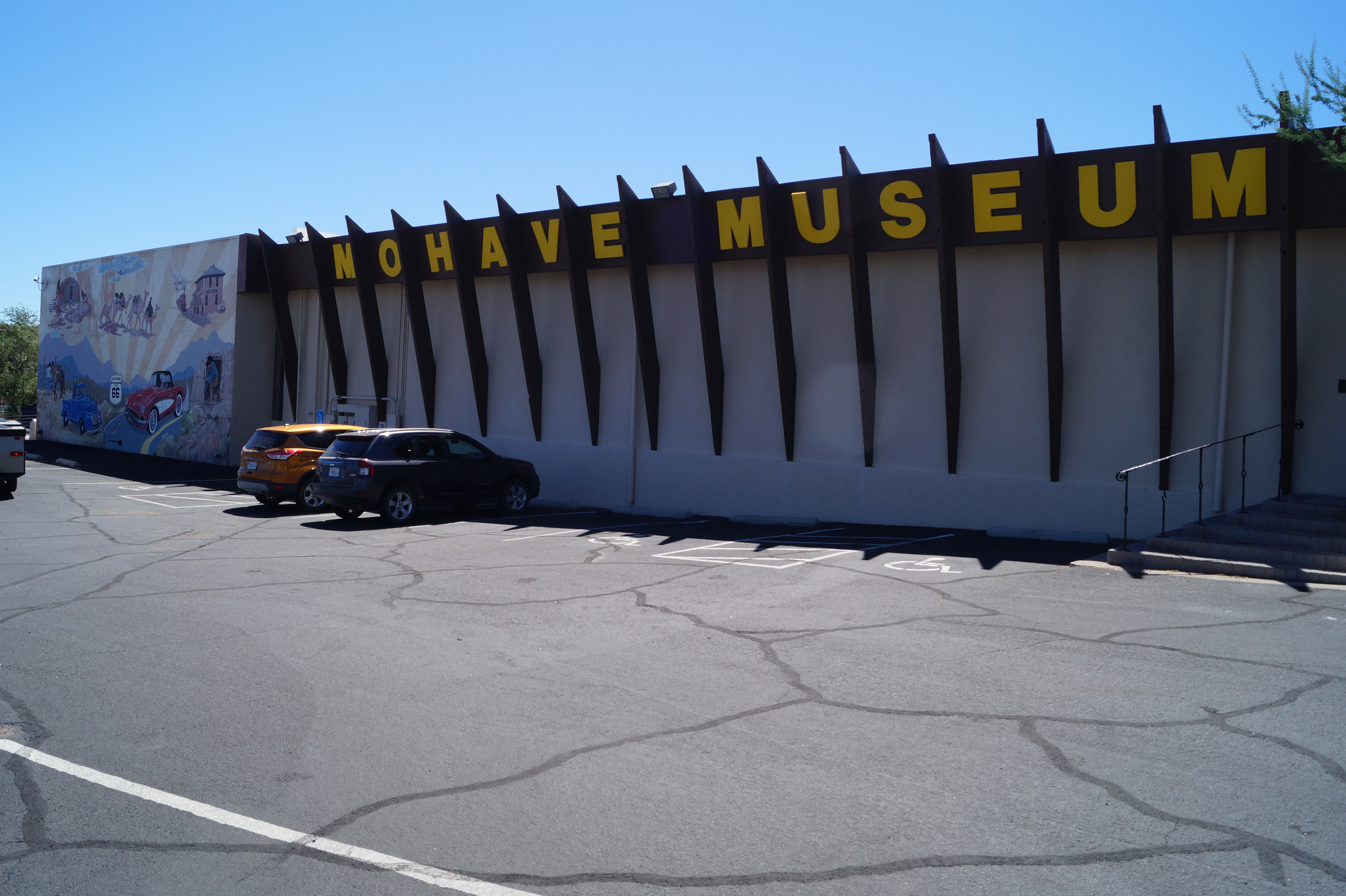
- Established: 1961; 65 years ago
- Location: 400 W. Beale Street, Kingman, Arizona
- Coordinates: 35.189992°N 114.061561°W
- Website: www.mohavemuseum.org

The Mohave Museum of History and Arts in Kingman, Arizona is a private, not-for-profit organization, which was founded in 1961. It focuses on the preservation of the heritage of Northwestern Arizona and of the presentation of history and arts to the public.

== History ==
The Mohave Museum of History and Arts was originally an archive room in the office of the Chamber of Commerce, founded in August 1961 by the Daughters of the Pioneers and operated by the Mohave Pioneers Historical Society. In 1967, the first building was erected and inaugurated in 1968 in the Chamber's parking lot. The artist Roy Purcell, who painted the ‘Journey’ rock murals in Chloride, Arizona was the first director in the new building and he developed many of the displays still in use today, including the Hualapai Indian room and the Mohave History room. The Museum expanded in 1979 with additional exhibit space. By 2000 the Chamber offices were relocated and their building was removed to make room for Museum parking. The museum's library was built and opened in 2005.

The Museum introduces visitors to the history of Northwestern Arizona. The collection of dioramas, murals and many artifacts show development from prehistoric times to the present. It displays also paintings, photographs, sculptures and crafts in the art gallery and carved turquoise mined in the Kingman area. The Hualapai Native American Room contains a full-size wickiup brush shelter, pottery, baskets, and other crafts. The museum has also a pipe organ used in concerts, and a special exhibit on local-boy-turned-movie-star Andy Devine. Outdoor exhibits display ranching and mining machinery, storefronts, a mine replica, and a 1923 railroad caboose. The museum's library collects documents, manuscripts, maps, and photos about Mohave County, Arizona and the American Southwest. A mining exhibit was added in 2008, a ranching exhibit added in 2010. The museum also includes an Andy Devine exhibit, a local boy turned movie star in the 1930s known for his funny voice. Outdoor exhibits include murals, mining machinery and a 1923 wooden railroad caboose.

== Exhibits ==
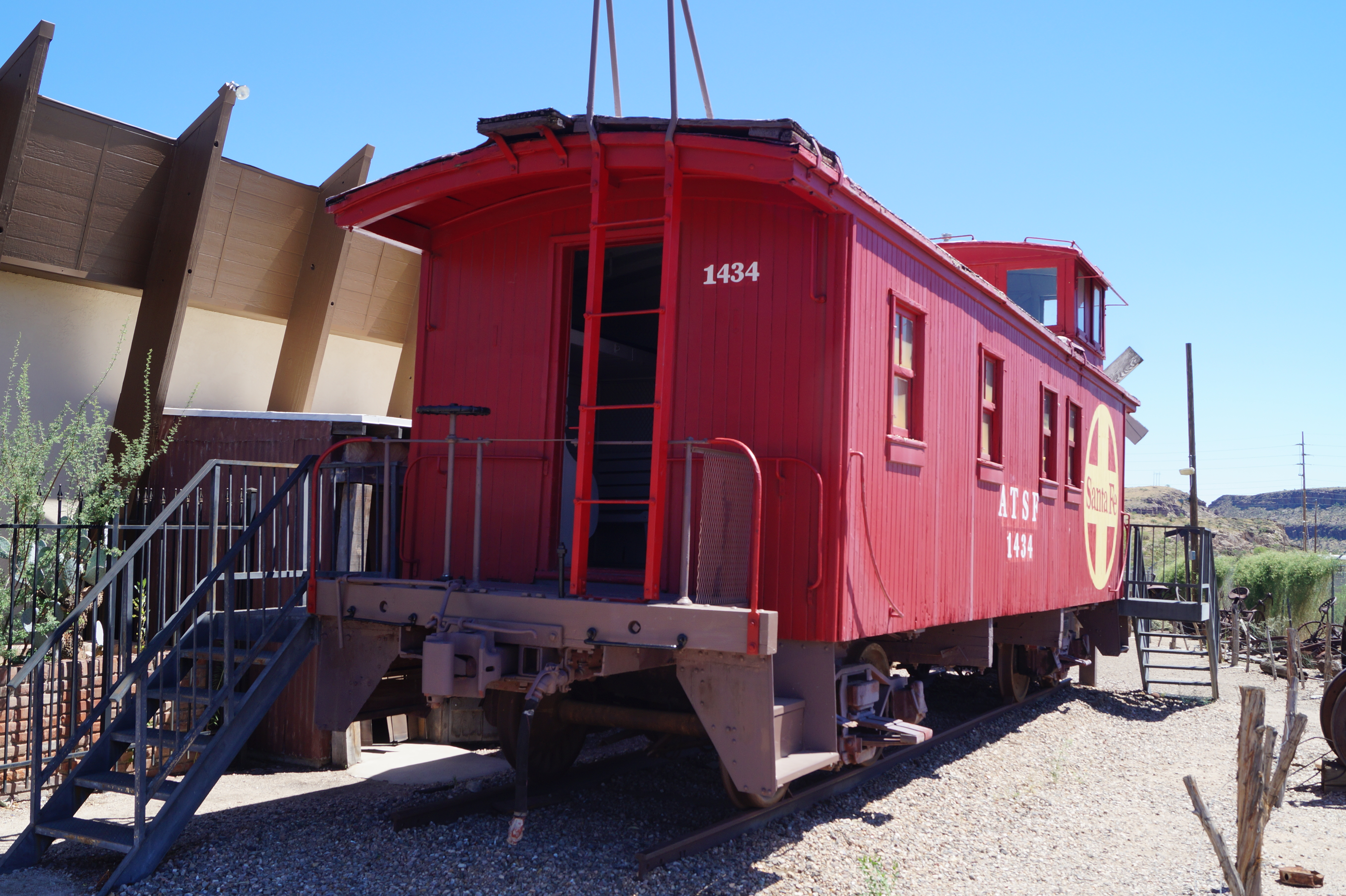
Caboose

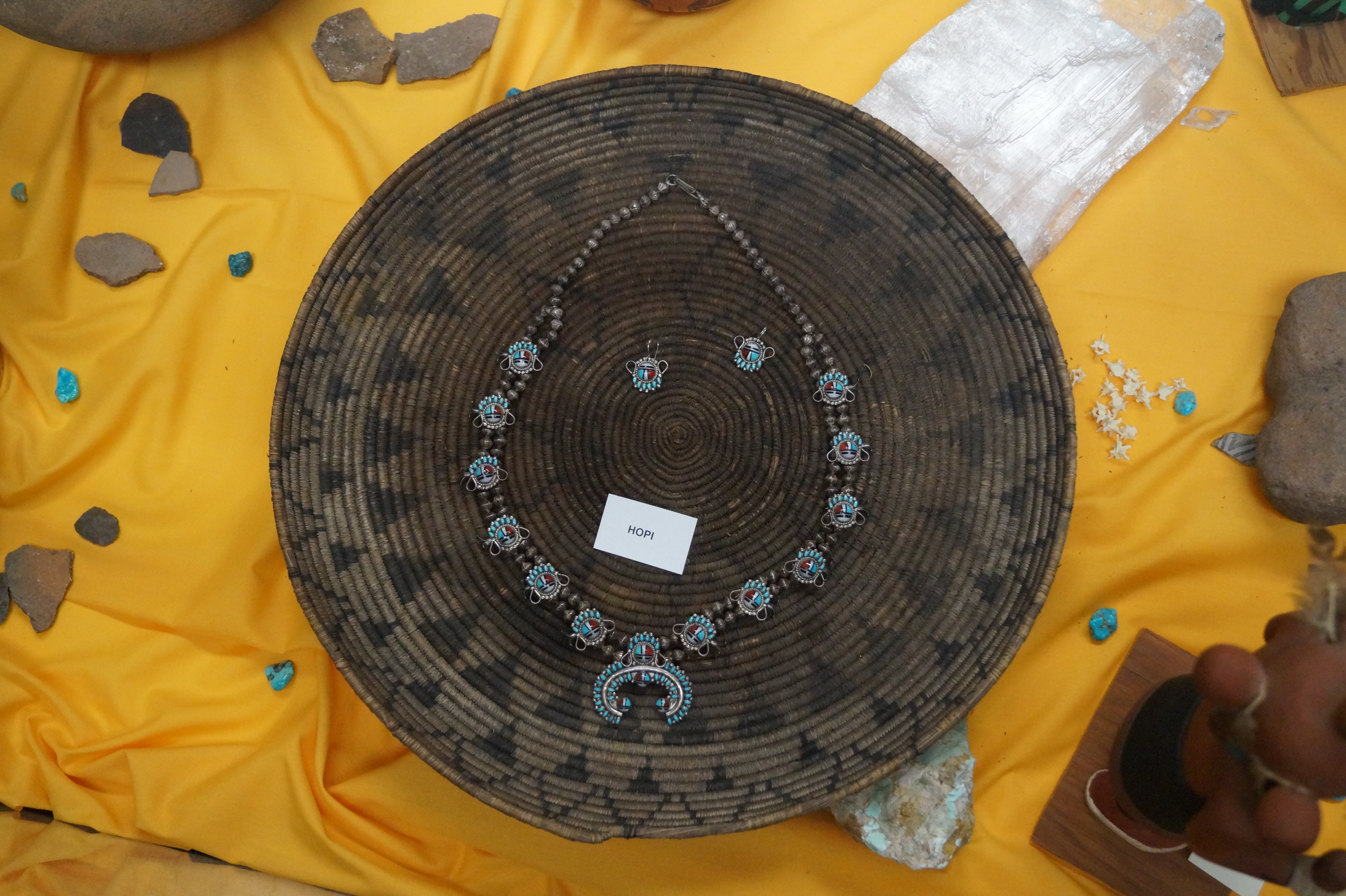
Hopi necklace

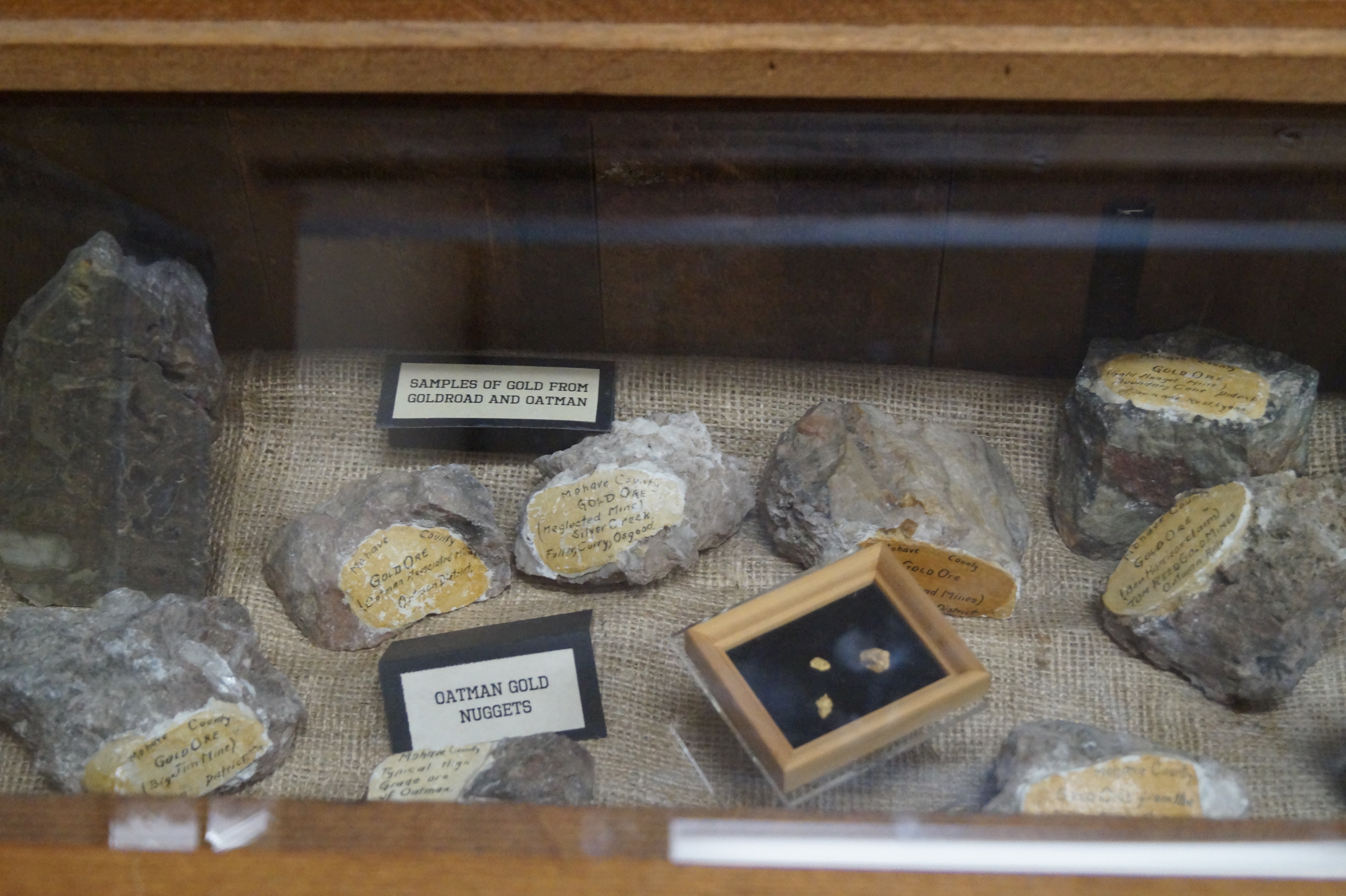
Samples of gold ore and nuggets

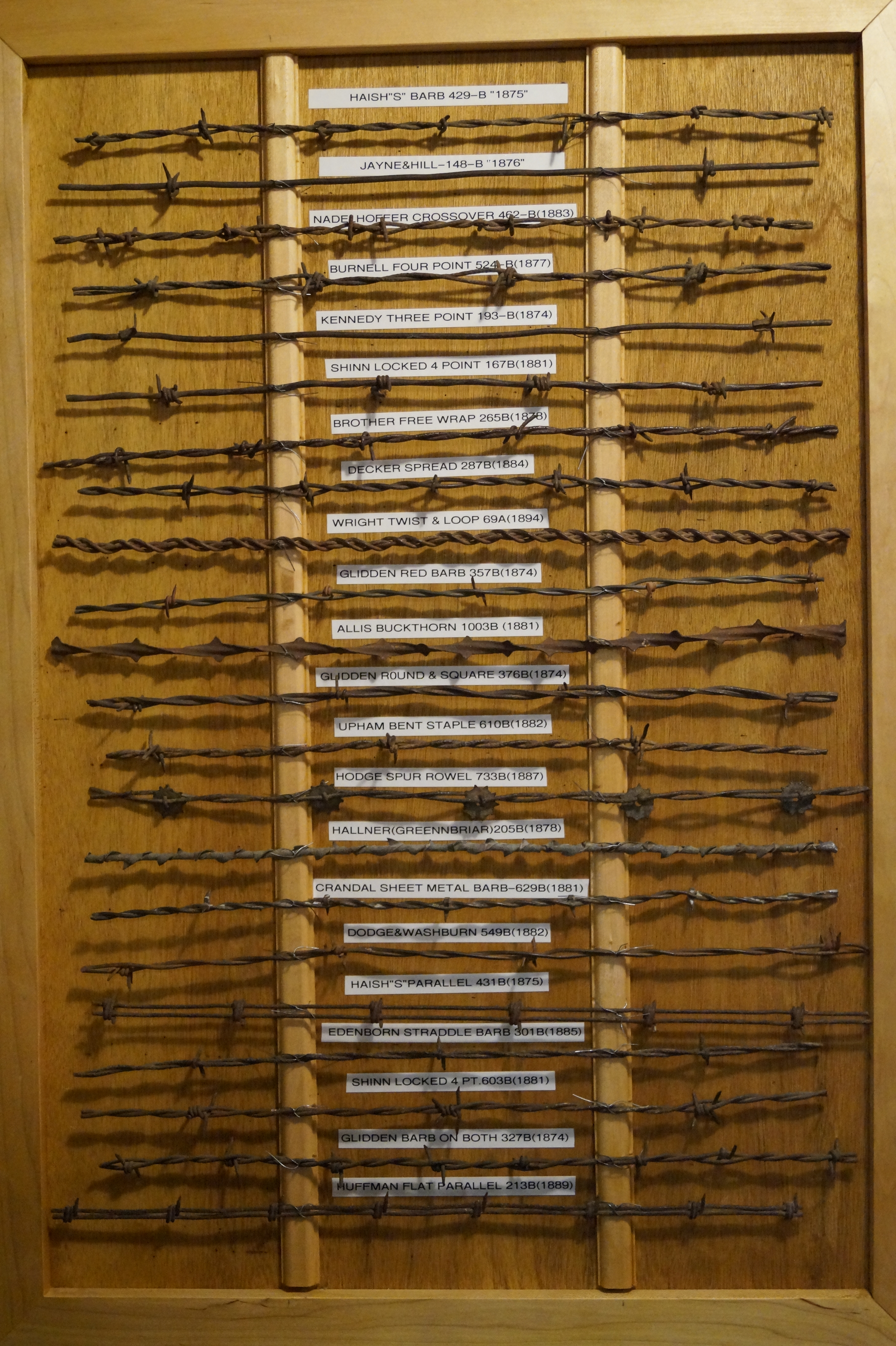
Barbed wire

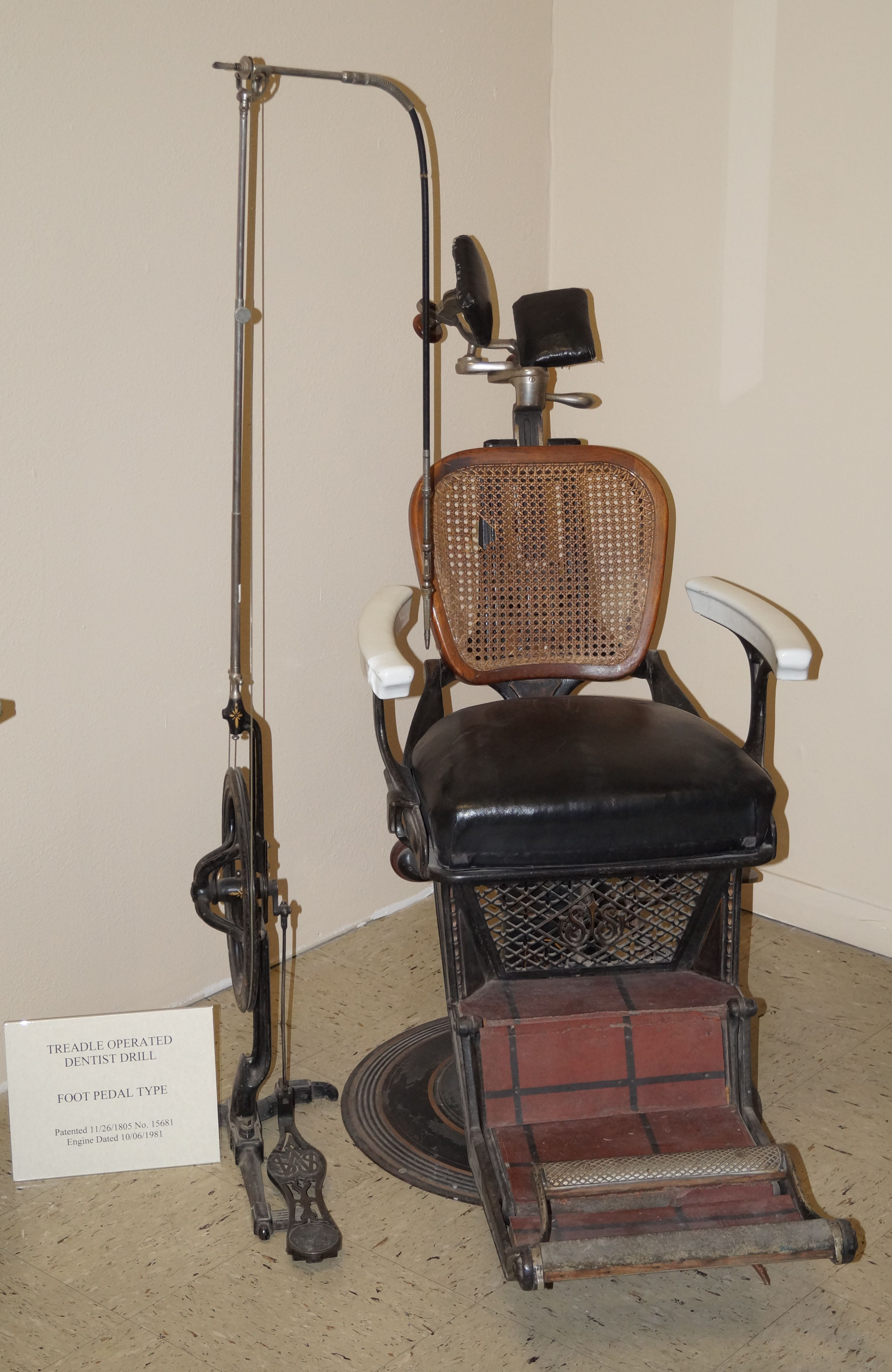
Wilkerson dental chair

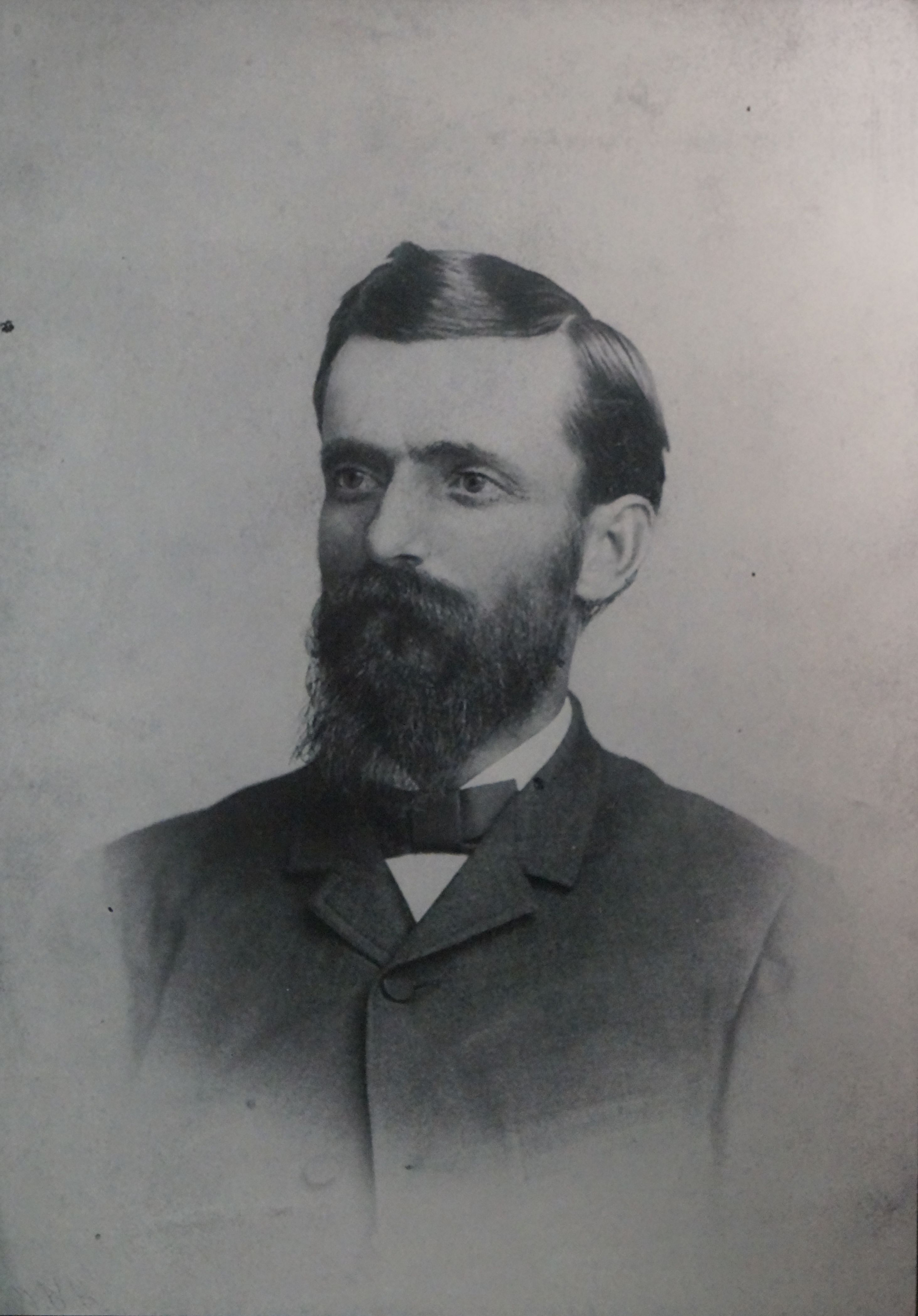
Lewis Kingman 1845-1912

== See also ==
- Lewis Kingman
- Wilkerson dental chair
