= Desert Power & Water Co. Electric Power Plant =

- Desert Power & Water Co., Electric Power Plant
- U.S. National Register of Historic Places
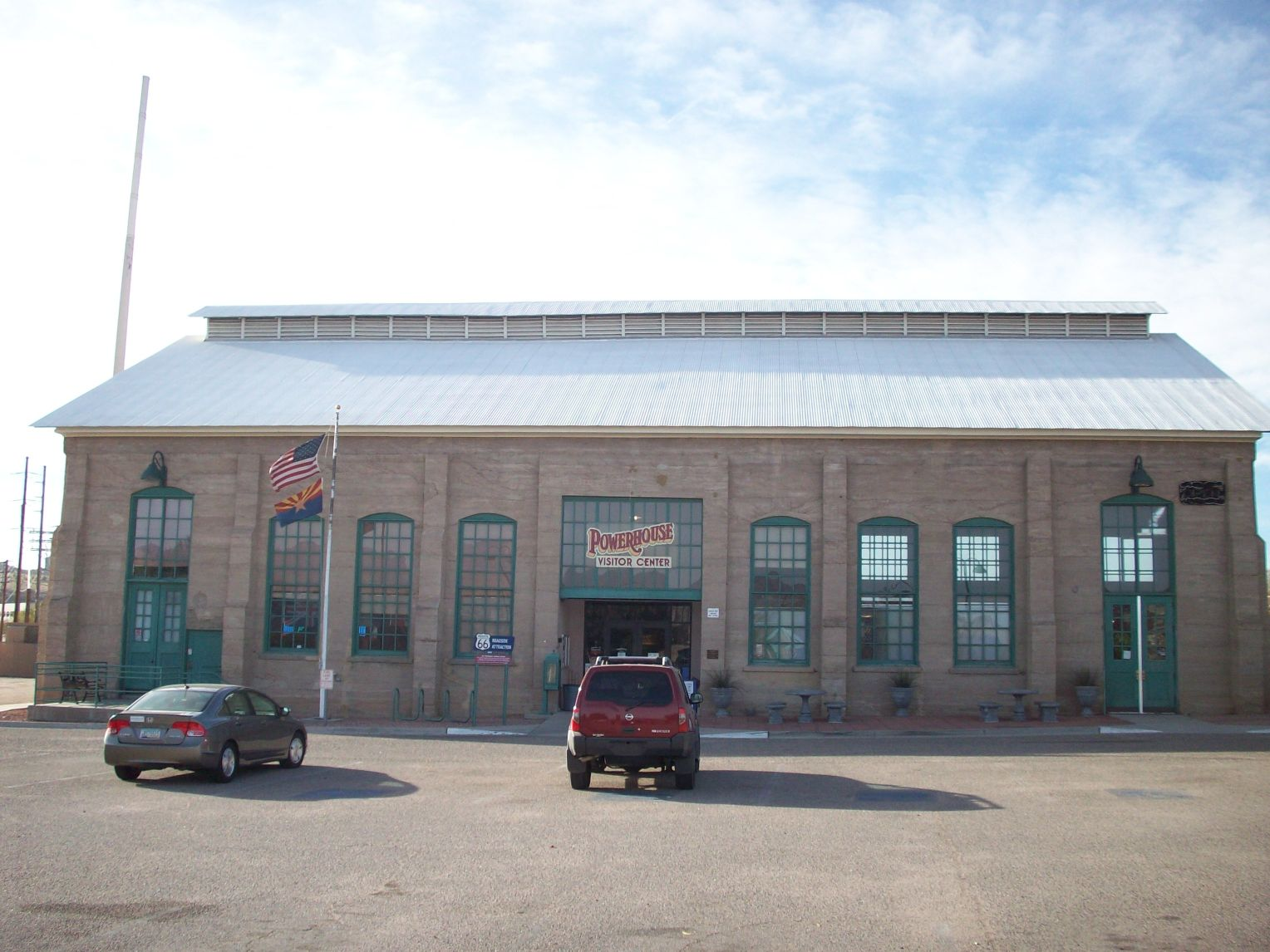

- Location within Arizona Location within the United States
- Location: Kingman, Arizona
- Coordinates: 35°11′20″N 114°3′30″W
- Built: 1907
- Architect: Tracy Engineering Co., McCafe Construction Co.
- MPS: Kingman MRA
- NRHP reference No.: 86001137
- Added to NRHP: May 14, 1986

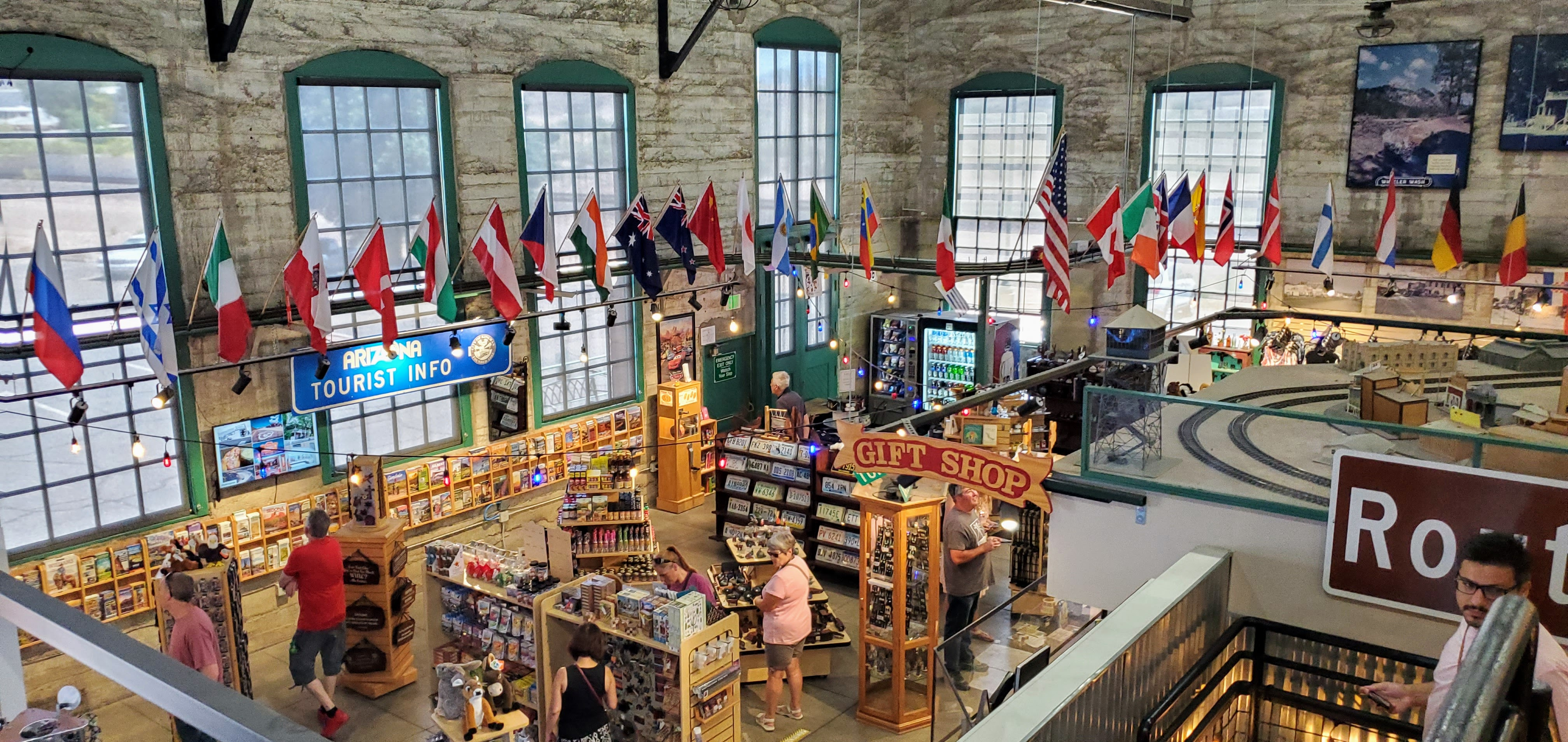
Kingman Visitor Center Interior, 2022

Desert Power & Water Co. Electric Power Plant is located at 120 Andy Devine Avenue in Kingman, Arizona. The building was built in 1907–08 with additions in the following years 1909 through 1911. Tracy Engineering Company was the architect and McCafe Contracting Company of Los Angeles was the contractor. The oil-fired plant was considered one of the largest steam electric power plants in the Western United States. It had a powerhouse, transformer house and office for Desert Power and Water. It operated until 1938; Hoover Dam took over the power supply. The building was vacant for some time, then used as a salvage yard.

In 1984, two local woman (Lilia Bumbullis & Cynthia McCafferty) got together and formed a group known as "The Powerhouse Gang." The group began a fund-raising pitch: “Join the Powerhouse Gang – Electrify Kingman”. In 1997, the building was open to the public as the "Powerhouse Visitor Center” and housed an Arizona Visitor Information Center, the Historic Route 66 Association of Arizona Gift Shop, and Memory Lane 50's Diner (closed in 2003). A front-page article in The Kingman Daily Miner (local paper) on October 22, 1997, wrote that “…the building officially begins its new life as a visitor center designed to generate tourism energy”.

The building belongs to the City of Kingman and is the home of the Kingman Tourism Office and Visitor Center, the Historic Route 66 Association of Arizona and the "Arizona Route 66 Museum".

The building was placed on the National Register of Historic Places on May 4, 1986.
