= Kingman, Arizona =

City in Arizona, United States

- City
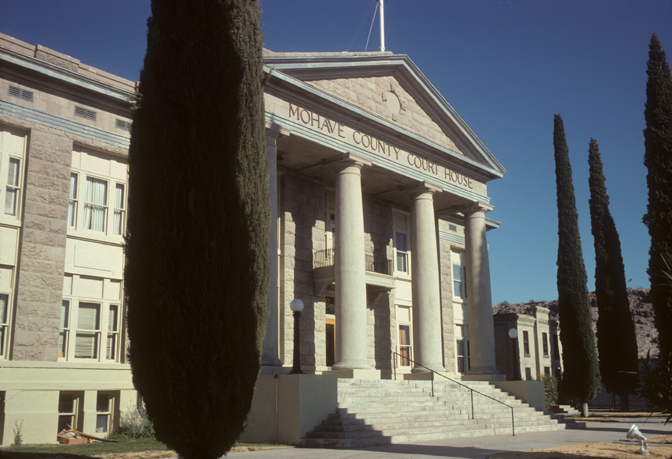
- The Mohave County Courthouse in Kingman

- Flag Seal
- Motto: The Heart of Historic Route 66
- Interactive map of Kingman, Arizona
- Location within Arizona
- Coordinates: 35.2170°N 114.0105°W
- Country: United States
- State: Arizona
- County: Mohave
- Founded: 1882
- Incorporated: January 21, 1952
- Named for: Lewis Kingman

Government
  - Type: Mayor–council
  - Mayor: Ken Watkins
  - Vice mayor: Cherish Sammeli
  - Councilmembers: Jim Dykens; Shawn Savage; Jamie Scott Stehly; Keith Walker; Smiley Ward
  - City manager: Timothy Walsh Jr., P.E.

Area
  - City: 37.547 sq mi (97.247 km^{2})
  - Land: 37.547 sq mi (97.247 km^{2})
  - Water: 0 sq mi (0.000 km^{2}) 0.00%
- Elevation: 3,471 ft (1,058 m)

Population (2020)
  - City: 32,689
  - Estimate (2025): 35,829
  - Density: 870.61/sq mi (336.14/km^{2})
  - Urban: 46,953
  - Metro: 228,102 (US: 212nd)
- Time zone: UTC–7 (Mountain (MST))
- ZIP Codes: 86401, 86402, 86409
- Area code: 928
- FIPS code: 04-37620
- GNIS feature ID: 2411547
- Highways: CR 20, US 93, CR 151, CR 157
- Website: www.cityofkingman.gov

Kingman is a city in and the county seat of Mohave County, Arizona, United States. It is named after Lewis Kingman, an engineer for the Atlantic and Pacific Railroad. The population was 32,689 as of the 2020 census, and was estimated at 35,829 in 2025.

== History ==
Lt. Edward Fitzgerald Beale, a U.S. Navy officer in the service of the Army Corps of Topographical Engineers, was ordered by the U.S. War Department to build a federal wagon road across the 35th parallel. His secondary orders were to test the feasibility of the use of camels as pack animals in the Southwestern desert. Beale traveled through the present-day Kingman in 1857 surveying the road and in 1859 to build the road. Beale's Wagon Road became part of U.S. Route 66 and later Interstate 40. Remnants of the wagon road can still be seen in White Cliffs Canyon in Kingman.

Kingman was founded in 1882 before statehood, in Arizona Territory. Situated in the Hualapai Valley between the Cerbat and Hualapai mountain ranges, Kingman had its modest beginnings as a simple railroad siding near Beale Springs. Civil engineer Lewis Kingman supervised the building of the railroad from Winslow to Beale Springs. This spring had been used by Native Americans living in the area for centuries.

The Mohave County seat was originally located in Mohave City from 1864 to 1867. In 1865, the portion of Arizona Territory west of the Colorado River was transferred to Nevada after Nevada's statehood, and became part of Lincoln County, now Clark County, Nevada. The remaining territory of Pah-Ute County became part of Mohave County. Its seat was moved to Hardyville (now within Bullhead City) in 1867. The county seat transferred to the mining town of Cerbat in 1873, then to Mineral Park near Chloride. After some time, the county seat and all instruments were permanently moved to Kingman in 1887.

During World War II, Kingman was the site of a United States Army Air Forces (USAAF) airfield. The Kingman Army Airfield (now Kingman Airport) was founded at the beginning of the war as an aerial gunnery training base. It became one of the USAAF's largest, training some 35,000 soldiers and airmen. The airfield and Kingman played a significant role in this important era of America's history. Following the war, the Kingman Airfield was one of the largest reclamation sites for obsolete military aircraft.

Postwar, Kingman experienced growth as several major employers moved into the vicinity. In 1953, Kingman was used to detain those men accused of practicing polygamy in the Short Creek raid, which was at the time one of the largest arrests in American history. In 1955, Ford Motor Company established a proving ground (now one of the Chrysler Proving Grounds) in nearby Yucca at the former Yucca Army Airfield. Several major new neighborhoods in Kingman were developed to house the skilled workers and professionals employed at the proving ground. Likewise, the development of the Mineral Park mine near adjacent Chloride, and construction of the Mohave Power Station in nearby Laughlin, Nevada, in 1971 contributed to Kingman's population growth. Also, the location of a General Cable plant at the Kingman Airport Industrial Park provided steady employment.

=== Kingman explosion ===
The Kingman Explosion, also known as the Doxol Disaster or Kingman BLEVE, was a catastrophic boiling liquid expanding vapor explosion (BLEVE) that occurred on July 5, 1973, during a propane transfer from a Doxol railroad car to a storage tank on the Getz rail siding near Andy Devine Avenue/Route 66. Firefighters Memorial Park in Kingman is dedicated to the 11 firefighters who died in the blaze.

=== 1980s and on ===
The 1915-built Mohave County Courthouse and 1909-built Jail were listed on the National Register of Historic Places in 1983. The downtown and other areas of Kingman were evaluated for historic resources in a 1985 study, the Kingman Multiple Resources Area study. The study identified 63 historic resources in Kingman and led to many of them being listed on the National Register of Historic Places in 1986. The county courthouse and jail, a 1928-built locomotive (the Santa Fe 3759), a World War II gunnery school radio tower, and about 50 various houses and other buildings in Kingman are listed on the National Register, comprising the majority of National Register listings in Mohave County.

== Geography ==
Kingman is in central Mohave County, along Interstate 40 and U.S. Route 93. The city is served by three exits on I-40, which leads east 147 miles (237 km) to Flagstaff and southwest 62 miles (100 km) to Needles, California. US-93 leads northwest 107 miles (172 km) to Las Vegas and southeast 130 miles (210 km) to Wickenburg, 54 miles (87 km) from Phoenix. US 93 is planned to be replaced by Interstate 11 once built to interstate highway standards.

According to the United States Census Bureau, the city has a total area of 37.547 square miles (97.25 km^{2}), all land.

=== Climate ===
Kingman sits on the eastern edge of the Mojave Desert, but it is located in a cold desert climate (Köppen BWk) due to its plateau location. Kingman's higher elevation and location between the Colorado Plateau and the Lower Colorado River Valley keeps summer high temperatures away from the extremes (115 °F (46 °C) or more) experienced by Phoenix and the Colorado River Valley. The higher elevation also contributes to winter cold and occasional snowfall. Summer daytime highs reach above 90 °F (32 °C) frequently, but rarely exceed 107 °F (42 °C). Summertime lows usually remain between 60 and 70 °F (16 and 21 °C). Winter highs are generally mild, ranging from around 50 to 60 °F (10 to 16 °C), but winter nighttime lows often fall to freezing, with significantly lower temperatures possible, and occasional snow.

The record low temperature in Kingman was set on January 9, 1937, at 6 °F (−14 °C), and the record high temperature occurred on July 15, 2023, at 114 °F (46 °C). The wettest year was 1919 with 21.22 inches (539 mm) and the driest year was 1947 with 3.58 inches (91 mm). The most rainfall in one month was 9.85 inches (250 mm) in September 1939. The most rainfall in 24 hours was 6.03 inches (153 mm) on November 28, 1919. The snowiest year was 1949 with 18.2 inches (46 cm). The most snowfall in one month was 14.0 inches (36 cm) in December 1932. On December 31, 2014, and January 1, 2015, Kingman received 6.5 inches (17 cm) of snow. The storm was so significant that it was a contributing factor in the closure of Interstate 40 at the US 93 Junction for 24 hours.

Climate data for Kingman, Arizona, 1991–2020 normals, extremes 1901–present
Month	Jan	Feb	Mar	Apr	May	Jun	Jul	Aug	Sep	Oct	Nov	Dec	Year
Record high °F (°C)	78 (26)	82 (28)	96 (36)	97 (36)	106 (41)	113 (45)	114 (46)	111 (44)	110 (43)	102 (39)	90 (32)	77 (25)	114 (46)
Mean maximum °F (°C)	68.6 (20.3)	72.9 (22.7)	80.7 (27.1)	89.9 (32.2)	96.7 (35.9)	105.3 (40.7)	107.7 (42.1)	105.1 (40.6)	100.8 (38.2)	90.5 (32.5)	81.8 (27.7)	69.7 (20.9)	108.9 (42.7)
Mean daily maximum °F (°C)	57.4 (14.1)	60.6 (15.9)	67.4 (19.7)	74.8 (23.8)	84.9 (29.4)	95.1 (35.1)	98.7 (37.1)	97.2 (36.2)	90.9 (32.7)	78.9 (26.1)	66.1 (18.9)	55.7 (13.2)	77.3 (25.2)
Daily mean °F (°C)	44.2 (6.8)	47.0 (8.3)	52.7 (11.5)	59.1 (15.1)	68.8 (20.4)	78.7 (25.9)	84.3 (29.1)	83.1 (28.4)	75.6 (24.2)	63.6 (17.6)	51.3 (10.7)	42.9 (6.1)	62.6 (17.0)
Mean daily minimum °F (°C)	30.9 (−0.6)	33.3 (0.7)	38.1 (3.4)	43.4 (6.3)	52.7 (11.5)	62.3 (16.8)	70.0 (21.1)	68.9 (20.5)	60.4 (15.8)	48.3 (9.1)	36.5 (2.5)	30.2 (−1.0)	47.9 (8.8)
Mean minimum °F (°C)	18.5 (−7.5)	20.9 (−6.2)	27.1 (−2.7)	31.3 (−0.4)	39.4 (4.1)	50.4 (10.2)	62.7 (17.1)	60.1 (15.6)	48.0 (8.9)	35.1 (1.7)	24.5 (−4.2)	19.5 (−6.9)	15.7 (−9.1)
Record low °F (°C)	4 (−16)	9 (−13)	11 (−12)	20 (−7)	29 (−2)	34 (1)	45 (7)	43 (6)	31 (−1)	23 (−5)	13 (−11)	6 (−14)	4 (−16)
Average precipitation inches (mm)	0.98 (25)	1.04 (26)	0.59 (15)	0.46 (12)	0.08 (2.0)	0.11 (2.8)	0.86 (22)	0.88 (22)	0.96 (24)	0.74 (19)	0.62 (16)	0.68 (17)	8.00 (203)
Average precipitation days (≥ 0.01 inch)	4.0	4.7	3.4	2.9	1.2	0.8	5.3	4.9	3.7	3.0	2.4	3.8	40.1
Source 1: National Oceanic and Atmospheric Administration (mean maxima/minima 2006–2020)
Source 2: National Centers for Environmental Information

== Demographics ==
Historical population
Census	Pop.	Note	%±
1890	322		—
1910	900		—
1920	1,276		41.8%
1930	2,275		78.3%
1950	3,342		—
1960	4,525		35.4%
1970	7,312		61.6%
1980	9,257		26.6%
1990	12,722		37.4%
2000	20,069		57.8%
2010	28,068		39.9%
2020	32,689		16.5%
2025 (est.)	35,829		9.6%
U.S. Decennial Census; 2020 Census

According to realtor website Zillow, the average price of a home as of July 31, 2026, in Kingman was $275,989.

=== 2024 American Community Survey ===
As of 2024 American Community Survey estimates, there were 34,375 people and 15,206 estimated households. The population density was 915.52 inhabitants per square mile (353.48/km^{2}). There were 15,812 housing units at an average density of 421.13 per square mile (162.60/km^{2}). The racial makeup of the city was 78.95% White, 2.00% African American, 1.10 Native American, 1.70% Asian, 0.48% Pacific Islander, 4.58% from some other races and 11.18% from two or more races. Hispanic or Latino people of any race were 15.97% of the population.

There were 15,206 households, 27.9% had children under the age of 18 living with them, 42.9% had seniors 65 years or older living with them, 45.4% were married couples living together, 8.7% were couples cohabitating, 19.4% had a male householder with no partner present, and 26.5% had a female householder with no partner present. The median household size was 2.20 and the median family size was 2.69.

The age distribution was 22.0% under 18, 6.2% from 18 to 24, 24.1% from 25 to 44, 22.3% from 45 to 64, and 25.4% who were 65 or older. The median age was 43.0 years. For every 100 females, there were 97.3 males.

The median income for a household was $61,792, with family households having a median income of $70,609 and non-family households $38,940. The per capita income was $34,866. Out of the 33,402 people with a determined poverty status, 14.3% were below the poverty line. Further, 17.7% of minors and 10.1% of seniors were below the poverty line.

In the survey, residents self-identified with various ethnic ancestries. People of German descent made up 16.8% of the population of the city, followed by English at 13.8%, Irish at 12.0%, American at 4.1%, Italian at 3.6%, French at 3.0%, Norwegian at 2.8%, Scottish at 2.6%, Polish at 1.6%, Dutch at 1.5%, Russian at 0.8%, Scotch-Irish at 0.8%, Welsh at 0.7%, French Canadian at 0.5%, Portuguese at 0.5%, Swedish at 0.5%, Hungarian at 0.4%, Swiss at 0.4%, Arab at 0.3%, Ukrainian at 0.3%, Czech at 0.2%, Danish at 0.2%, West Indian at 0.1%, Greek at 0.0%, Lithuanian 0.0%, Slovak 0.0%, and Subsaharan African 0.0%.

The top five reported languages (people were allowed to report up to two languages, thus the figures will generally add to more than 100%) were English (92.0%), Spanish (5.0%), Indo-European (0.8%), Asian and Pacific Islander (1.4%), and Other (0.8%).

Kingman has an estimated 47.0% employment rate, with 20.0% of the population holding a bachelor's degree or higher and 89.5% holding a high school diploma.

Kingman, Arizona – racial and ethnic composition Note: the US Census treats Hispanic/Latino as an ethnic category. This table excludes Latinos from the racial categories and assigns them to a separate category. Hispanics/Latinos may be of any race.
Race / ethnicity (NH = non-Hispanic)	Pop. 1980	Pop. 1990	Pop. 2000	Pop. 2010	Pop. 2020
White alone (NH)	8,276 (89.40%)	11,393 (89.55%)	17,119 (85.30%)	22,806 (81.25%)	24,585 (75.21%)
Black or African American alone (NH)	0 (0.00%)	34 (0.27%)	109 (0.54%)	271 (0.97%)	397 (1.21%)
Native American or Alaska Native alone (NH)	195 (2.11%)	207 (1.63%)	329 (1.64%)	402 (1.43%)	463 (1.42%)
Asian alone (NH)	68 (0.73%)	127 (1.00%)	284 (1.42%)	452 (1.61%)	674 (2.06%)
Pacific Islander alone (NH)	—	—	27 (0.13%)	85 (0.30%)	80 (0.24%)
Other race alone (NH)	16 (0.17%)	12 (0.09%)	17 (0.08%)	14 (0.05%)	141 (0.43%)
Mixed race or multiracial (NH)	—	—	328 (1.63%)	535 (1.91%)	1,639 (5.01%)
Hispanic or Latino (any race)	702 (7.58%)	949 (7.46%)	1,856 (9.25%)	3,503 (12.48%)	4,710 (14.41%)
Total	9,257 (100.00%)	12,722 (100.00%)	20,069 (100.00%)	28,068 (100.00%)	32,689 (100.00%)

=== 2020 census ===
As of the 2020 census, there were 32,689 people, 13,207 households, and 8,371 families residing in the city. The population density was 870.62 inhabitants per square mile (336.15/km^{2}). There were 14,135 housing units at an average density of 376.46 per square mile (145.35/km^{2}). The racial makeup of the city was 80.18% White, 1.31% African American, 1.87% Native American, 2.14% Asian, 0.27% Pacific Islander, 4.52% from some other races and 9.71% from two or more races. Hispanic or Latino people of any race were 14.41% of the population.

=== 2010 census ===
As of the 2010 census, there were 28,068 people, 11,217 households, and 7,301 families residing in the city. The population density was 806.09 inhabitants per square mile (311.23/km^{2}). There were 12,724 housing units at an average density of 365.42 per square mile (141.09/km^{2}). The racial makeup of the city was 88.04% White, 1.03% African American, 1.70% Native American, 1.67% Asian, 0.30% Pacific Islander, 4.20% from some other races and 3.06% from two or more races. Hispanic or Latino people of any race were 12.48% of the population.

=== 2000 census ===
As of the 2000 census, there were 20,069 people, 7,854 households and 5,427 families residing in the city. The population density was 669.68 inhabitants per square mile (258.56/km^{2}). There were 8,604 housing units at an average density of 287.11 per square mile (110.85/km^{2}). The racial makeup of the city was 89.94% White, 0.55% African American, 1.98% Native American, 1.44% Asian, 0.14% Pacific Islander, 3.41% from some other races and 2.53% from two or more races. Hispanic or Latino people of any race were 9.25% of the population.

There were 7,854 households out of which 30.1% have children under the age of 18 living with them, 54.6% were married couples living together, 10.1% have a female householder with no husband present, and 30.9% were non-families. 25.5% of all households were made up of individuals and 11.7% have someone living alone who was 65 years of age or older. The average household size was 2.47 and the average family size was 2.94.

In the city the population was spread out with 25.0% under the age of 18, 7.4% from 18 to 24, 25.6% from 25 to 44, 24.2% from 45 to 64, and 17.8% who were 65 years of age or older. The median age was 40 years. For every 100 females there were 97.5 males. For every 100 females age 18 and over, there were 94.4 males.

The median income for a household in the city was $34,086, and the median income for a family was $41,327. Males have a median income of $32,036 versus $21,134 for females. The per capita income for the city was $17,181. 11.6% of the population and 8.2% of families were below the poverty line. Out of the total people living in poverty, 15.3% were under the age of 18 and 7.9% were 65 or older.

== Government and infrastructure ==
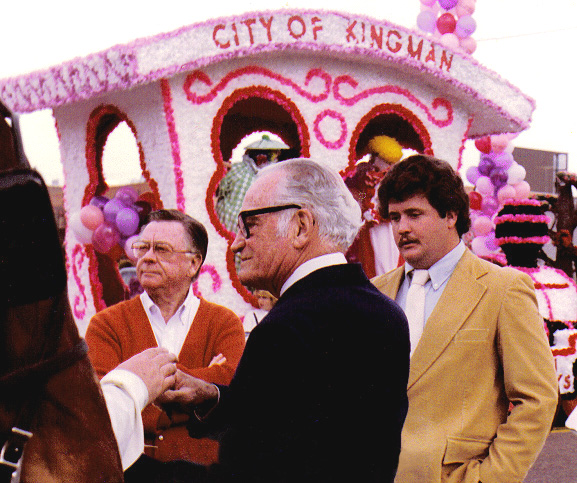
US Senator Barry Goldwater in Kingman, 1983

The city operates under the council-manager form of government. The city council, which is the policymaking and legitimate authority, consists of a mayor, vice-mayor, a five-member council and the city manager. The mayor is Ken Watkins and the vice-mayor seat is vacant. The city council consists of five elected officials – councilmembers SueAnn Mello, Jamie Scott Stehly, Deana Nelson, Cherish Sammeli and Keith Walker. The city manager is Ron Foggin. The city attorney is Carl Cooper.

It is in Arizona's 9th congressional district, represented by Republican Paul Gosar. In the Arizona State Legislature, Kingman is in Arizona's 30th legislative district.

The city government also includes boards and commissions that assist the council in decision making. They are the:

- Clean City Commission
- Economic Development & Marketing Commission
- Golf Course Advisory Commission
- Historical Preservation Commission
- Municipal Utilities Commission
- Parks and Recreations Commission
- Planning and Zoning Commission
- Transit Advisory Commission
- Tourism Development Commission
- Youth Advisory Commission
- Tri-City Council

Arizona State Prison – Kingman, a privately run prison of the Arizona Department of Corrections, is located in unincorporated Mohave County near Kingman.

The United States Department of the Interior Bureau of Land Management has a field office located in Kingman.

Mohave County Superior Court is located in Kingman.

Mohave County Administration offices are located in Kingman.

The Mohave County Fairgrounds are located in Kingman.

== Economy ==
=== Top employers ===
According to the city's 2025 Annual Comprehensive Financial Report, the largest employers in the city are:

#	Employer	# of Employees	Percentage of Total City Employment
1	Mohave County	1,358	10.05%
2	Kingman Regional Medical Center	1,300	9.62%
3	Desert De Oro Foods, Inc.	1,042	7.71%
4	Kingman Unified School District #20	795	5.88%
5	American Woodmark	513	3.80%
6	City of Kingman	421	3.12%
7	Mohave Community College	315	2.33%
8	Cardinal Health	200	1.48%
9	Arizona	187	1.38%
10	Cracker Barrel	118	0.87%
—	Total	6,249	46.24%
—	Total employment	13,510	100.00%

== Infrastructure ==
=== Transportation ===
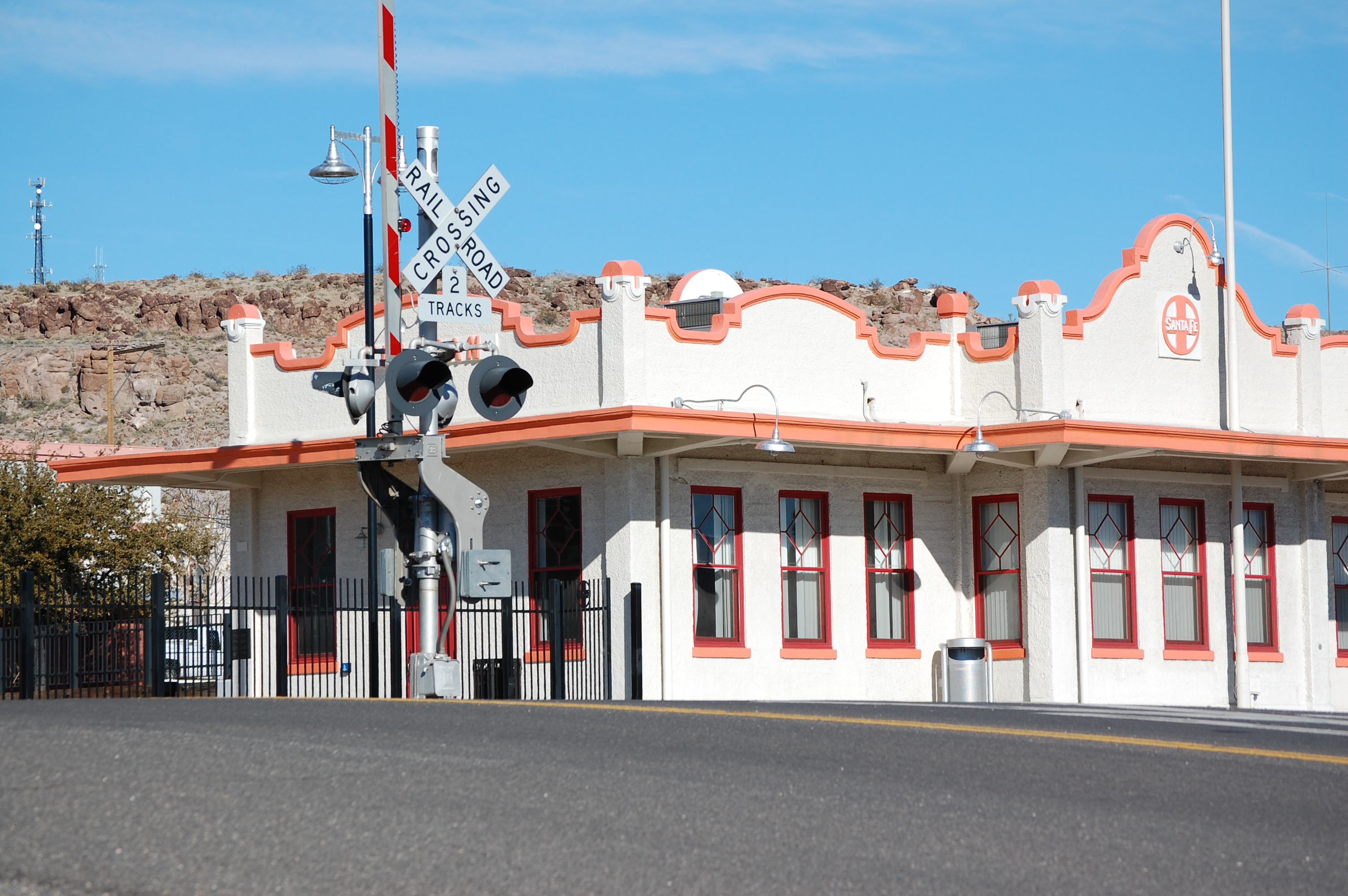
The Amtrak station in downtown Kingman

==== Major highways ====
- Interstate 11 (Future)
- Interstate 40
- U.S. Route 93
- Arizona State Route 66
- Business Loop 40 and Arizona SR 66 are composed of the remnants of what was U.S. Route 66.
- Arizona State Route 68

==== Airport ====
The Kingman Airport is located 9 miles (14 km) northeast of Kingman on Arizona State Route 66. The airport was originally built as Kingman Army Air Field during World War II and was the location of the Kingman Aerial Gunnery School. The airport was turned over to Mohave County for civilian use in 1949. There are air ambulance and air charter services, but no commercial flights. The closest commercial airport is Harry Reid International Airport in Paradise, Nevada, approximately 104 miles (167 km) northwest of Kingman. The Kingman airport now primarily exists as a location for long-term aircraft storage due to its suitable large ramp space and a long, decommissioned runway. Kingman is a non-towered airport.

==== Rail ====
Located downtown, the Kingman station has daily services on Amtrak's Amtrak Southwest Chief between Los Angeles and Chicago. The historically significant station is constructed in Mission Revival style. Prior to the establishment of Amtrak in 1971, the building had fallen into disrepair. A total renovation was completed in 2010. The station houses a model-railroad museum. Amtrak Thruway offers connecting service to Las Vegas.

Kingman is located on the Southern Transcon route of the BNSF Railway which is the main transcontinental route between Los Angeles and Chicago, which carries approximately 100 to 150 freight trains per day.

In August 2012, the Kingman Terminal Railroad (KGTR) opened at the Kingman Airport Authority and Industrial Park. The KGTR is a short line railroad owned by Patriot Rail. Patriot Rail owns and operates 13 railroads in 13 states across the U.S. The KGTR interchanges with BNSF and delivers to businesses at the industrial park.

==== Buses and shuttles ====
The City of Kingman operates Kingman Area Regional Transit. Kingman is served by the intercity bus companies Greyhound and TUFESA. FlixBus boards from a stop at 915 W Beale St. Tri-State Shuttle connects Kingman with Harry Reid International Airport in Paradise.

Amtrak Thruway is Kingman station bus service that travels to Las Vegas's stations at South Strip Transit Terminal, Airport Terminal One and Las Vegas downtown, called the Amtrak Kingman-Las Vegas Thruway Motorcoach, a 107-mile (172 km) trip. There is also a Laughlin to Kingman Amtrak Station at the Tropicana Laughlin in Laughlin, Nevada, a 34-mile (55 km) trip.

=== Water ===
The water system uses groundwater. The same aquifer serving the city is used by the industrial agriculture in the surrounding desert.

== Education ==
Kingman has one public school district, one charter school district and one Christian school.

=== Public schools ===
Kingman Unified School District (KUSD) consists of 12 schools, ranging from Kindergarten to high school.

Elementary schools

- Hualapai Elementary School
- Cerbat Elementary School
- Palo Christi Elementary School (closed)
- Black Mountain Elementary School (located in the neighboring town of Golden Valley)
- La Senita Elementary School
- Manzanita Elementary School
- Desert Willow Elementary School
- Kingman Academy of Learning Primary/Intermediate School

Middle schools

- Golden Valley Middle School
- Kingman Middle School
- White Cliffs Middle School
- Kingman Academy of Learning Middle School

High schools

- Kingman High School
- Lee Williams High School
- Kingman Academy of Learning High School

K–12

- Mt. Tipton School, a KUSD K–12 school, is located in Dolan Springs, approximately 30 miles (48 km) northwest of Kingman.

=== Other schools ===
- The Kingman Academy of Learning, a charter school, is split into four schools: a primary (pre-school – 2nd grade), intermediate (3–5), middle (6–8), and high school (9–12).
- The Emmanuel Christian Academy teaches students from kindergarten to 8th grade.
- Arizona Virtual Academy is a (K–12) Blended learning center.

=== Post-secondary education ===
- One of four main campuses, Mohave Community College, a junior college, is located in Kingman.
- Northern Arizona University has an extension campus located in Kingman.

== Notable people ==
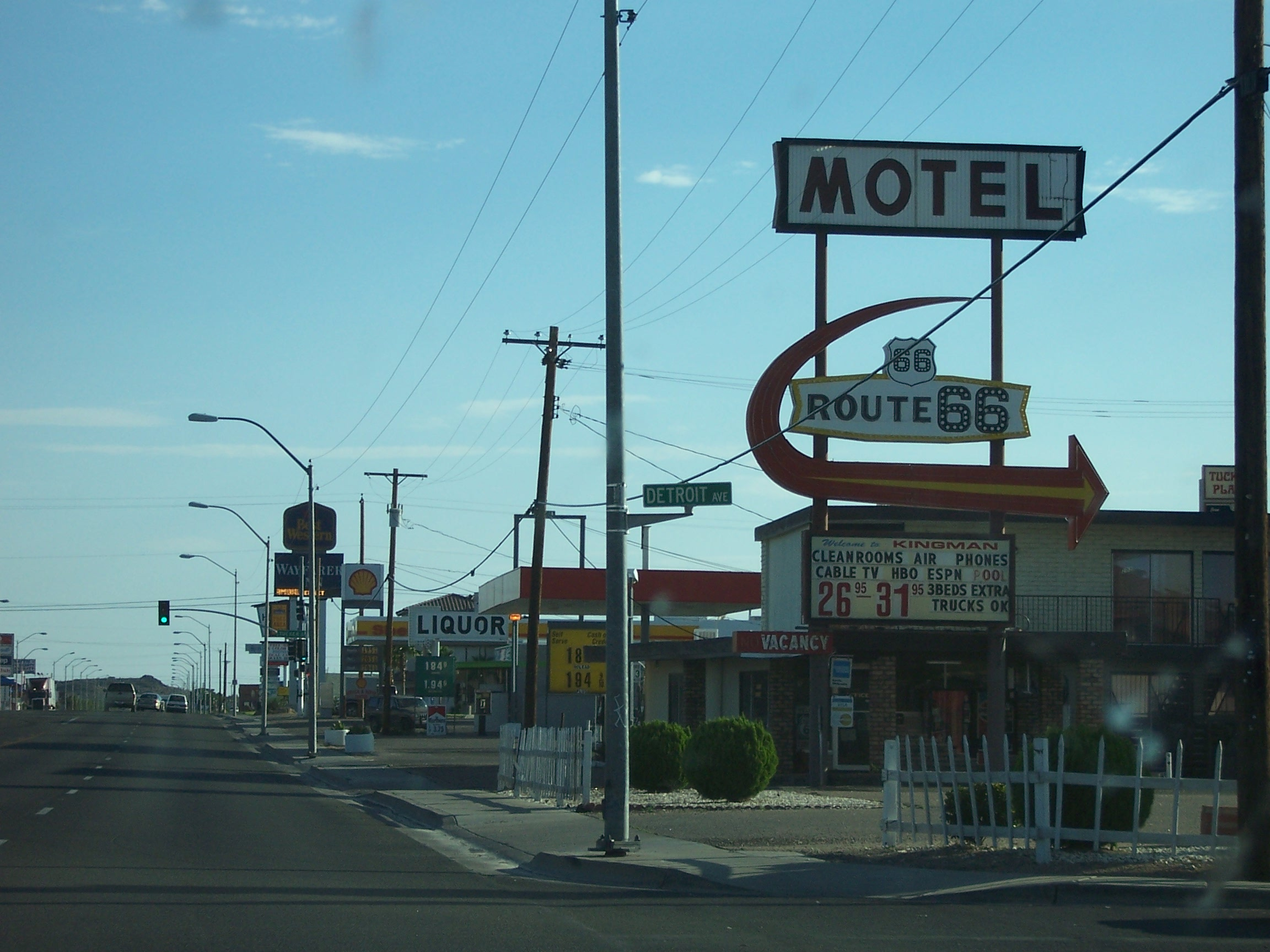
Motels along Andy Devine Avenue in Kingman in 2004

- Clifton Bloomfield, serial killer, was born in Kingman
- Andy Devine (1905–1977), actor, was raised in Kingman
- Carlos Elmer (1920–1993), writer and photographer, was raised in Kingman.
- Michael Fortier, Timothy McVeigh's co-conspirator, lived in Kingman from the age of seven.
- Miki Garcia, model and Playboy magazine's Playmate for the January 1973 issue, was born in Kingman.
- Doris Hill (1905–1976), born Roberta M. Hill, was an American film actress of the 1920s and 1930s.
- Paul Kalanithi (1977–2015), neurosurgeon and writer, was raised in Kingman.
- Timothy McVeigh (1968–2001), who carried out the Oklahoma City bombing, was a resident of Kingman.
- Doug Mirabelli, former Boston Red Sox catcher, was born in Kingman.
- Aron Ra, atheist activist, regional director of American Atheists
- Joseph Rosenberg, bank executive, worked as a banker in Kingman.
- Tarik Skubal, MLB pitcher for the Los Angeles Dodgers
- Karen Steele, actress, lived and died in Kingman.

== In popular culture ==
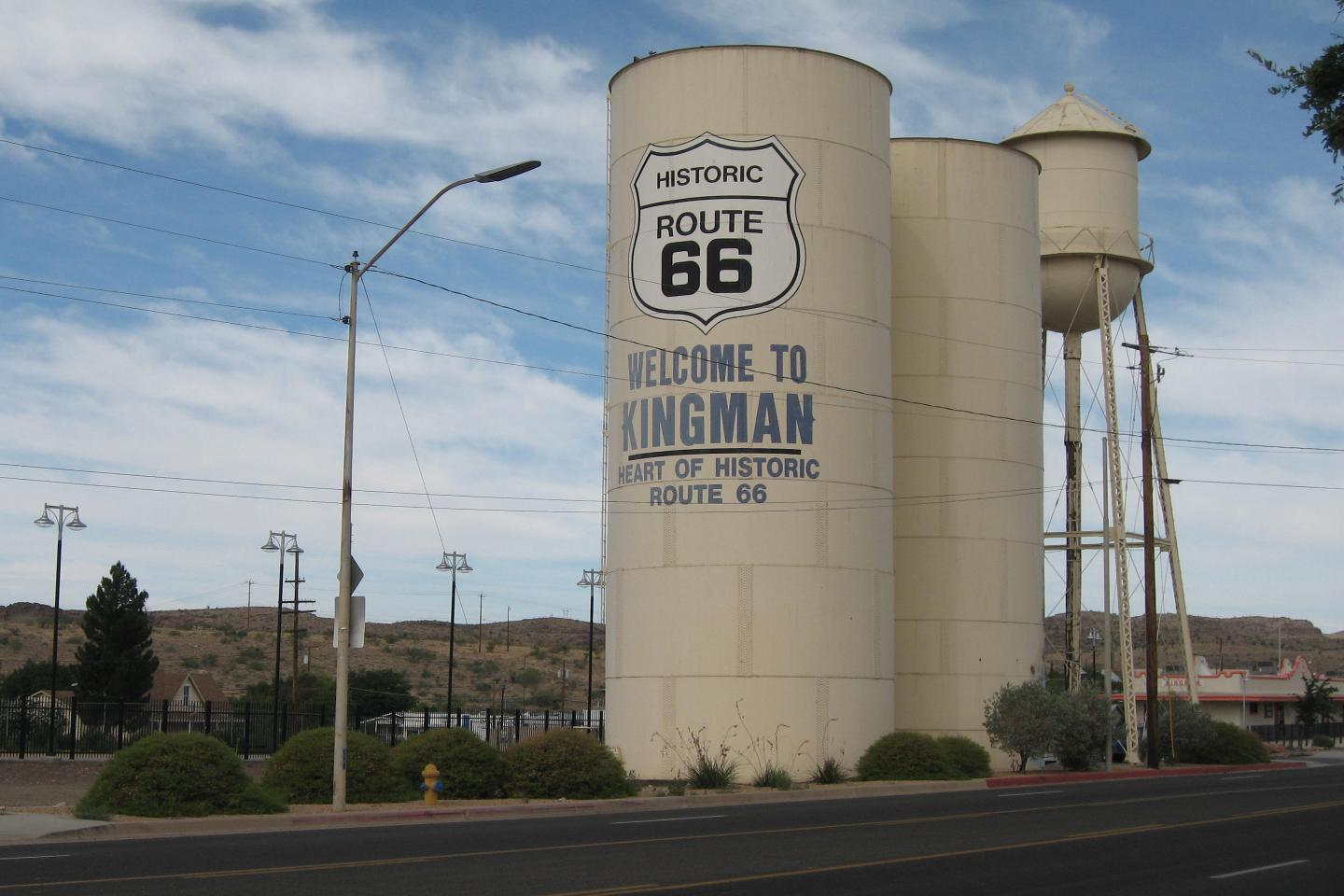
A "Welcome to Kingman" sign on a water tower, marking its connection with Route 66

=== Off screen ===
- Clark Gable and Carole Lombard were married at the rectory of Saint John's Methodist Episcopal Church in 1939, during a break in the shooting of Gone with the Wind.

=== Onscreen ===
Kingman has been used as a filming location for several movies and television shows.

==== In films ====
- The films Roadhouse 66 and Two-Lane Blacktop were shot in Kingman.
- The movie Management takes place but was not shot in Kingman.
- Scenes from the movie Fear and Loathing in Las Vegas were filmed at the Kingman Airport; in the scene, it is possible to see a clear shot of the Hualapai Mountains.
- Scenes from the 1992 movie Universal Soldier were filmed in the downtown area as well as a local grocery store and at the Kingman Airport.

==== In television ====
- In "Otis", an episode from the television series Prison Break, LJ Burrows is sent to an adult facility in Kingman, Arizona. In a subsequent episode, "Buried", LJ is released from the aforementioned facility.
- In "Native Tongue", an episode from the television series Medium (NBC: 2005–2009; CBS: 2009–2011), Alison has a dream about a man being threatened to be burned alive unless he revels the whereabouts of something the killer wants. The man tells the killer that 'it' is near Kingman, where his partner lives. As the story progresses, it is discovered that the man is associated with the Navajo Reservation located 20 E of Kingman.
- In the HBO series The Sopranos, when Tony Soprano was shot at the beginning of season 6, he fell into a coma and believed he was involved in a case of mistaken identity with Kevin Finnerty who lived in Kingman (see "Join the Club").
- In "The Locomotion Interruption," the season 8 premiere of The Big Bang Theory, Sheldon Cooper finds his belongings stolen at Kingman station.
- In episode 2 of the Showtime political satire documentary Who Is America?, residents of the town are shown making anti-Muslim and anti-black statements when told by a disguised Sacha Baron Cohen that a super mosque would be built in Kingman.

==== In literature and publications ====
- The town is mentioned in Barbara Kingsolver's novel Pigs in Heaven.
- In the post-apocalyptic novel Warday, Kingman is the "point of entry" to California; the Golden State, spared from the nuclear attacks that hit much of the rest of the country, is strictly guarded by troops, and "illegals" are jailed.

==== In music ====
- The town is mentioned in the lyrics of Bobby Troup's song "Route 66".

== Points of interest ==
- Hualapai Mountain Recreation Area offering hiking, camping and day use, 12 miles (19 km) to the southeast of downtown.
- The Mohave Museum of History and Arts in Kingman, Arizona is a private, not-for-profit organization, which was founded in 1961. It focuses on the preservation of the heritage of Northwestern Arizona and of the presentation of history and arts to the public. Located at 400 W. Beale St. In downtown Kingman.
- Santa Fe 3759 Historic locomotive on display located in historic downtown Kingman between First, and Beale St. at Locomotive Park.
- White Cliffs Trail System. The White Cliffs Trail System (WCTS) contains 9.7 miles of hand constructed trails, providing hikers and bikers access to trails of varying difficulties. The trail system not only allows hikers and bikers a thrilling and scenic venture into the desert valleys, hillsides, and tops of mesas, but provides a link from Downtown to Uptown Kingman. The system also features historic significance to the area and western culture.
- Historic Downtown Kingman. Featuring restaurants, bars, shops, and parks.
- Bonelli House, a 1915 historic home and museum operated by Mohave County Historical Society. Placed on the National Registry of Historic Places in April, 1975.
- Kingman Powerhouse Desert Power & Water Co. Electric Power Plant. Home of the Kingman Tourism Office and Visitor Center, the Historic Route 66 Association of Arizona and the "Arizona Route 66 Museum." The building was placed on the National Register of Historic Places on May 4, 1986.
- Cerbat Cliffs Golf Course, situated in a convenient location in the middle of town, off of I-40 at Stockton Hill Rd.
- Oatman, a "ghost town" tourist attraction 28 miles (45 km) southwest of Kingman
- Lake Mead National Recreation Area, A lake offering recreational water activities such as boating, fishing, and swimming 36 miles (58 km) west of Kingman
