= Wilkerson dental chair =

Hydraulic dental chair

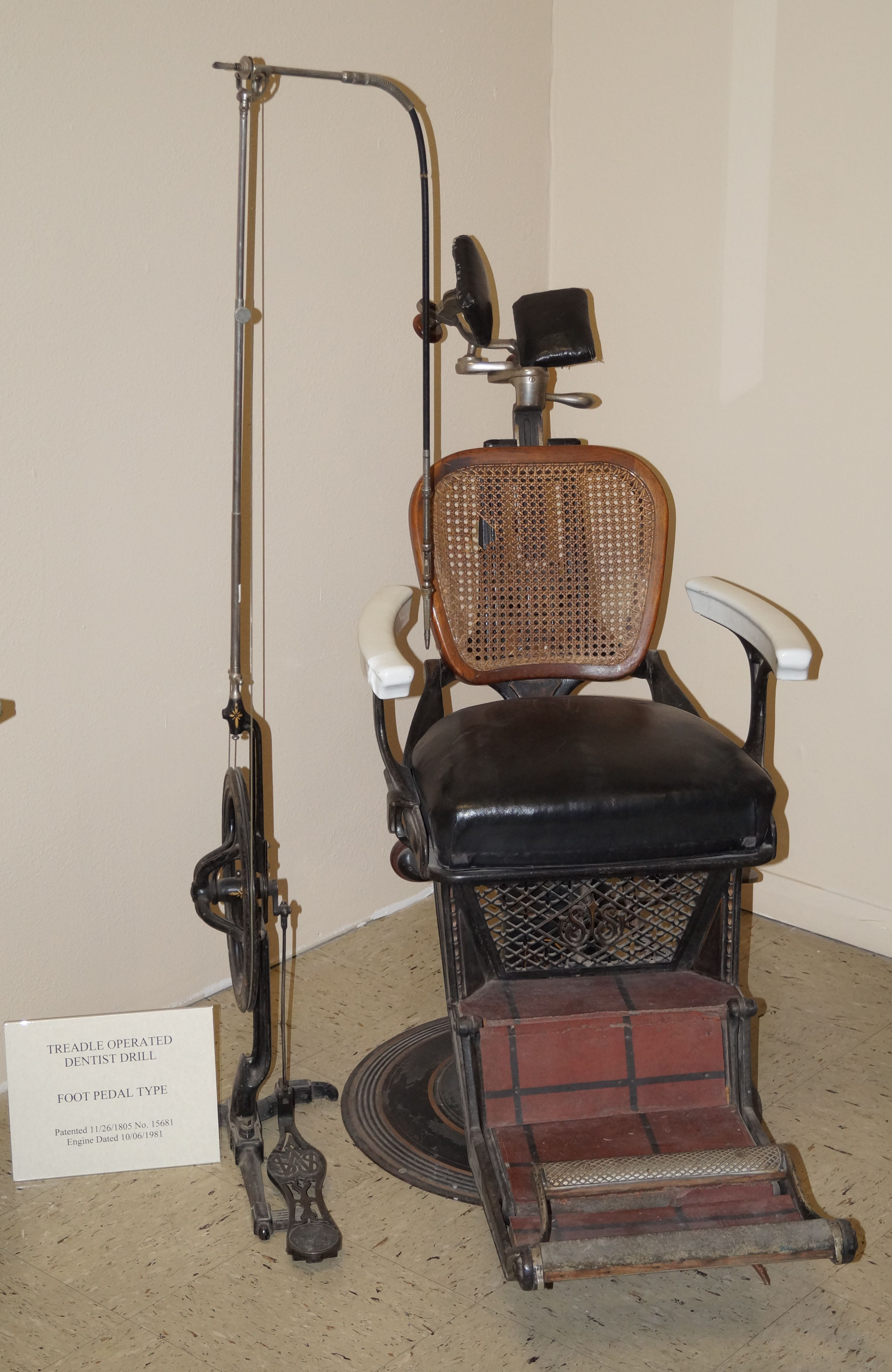
Wilkerson dental chair exhibited in the Mohave Museum of History and Arts

The Wilkerson dental chair is a hydraulic dental chair, first patented on 20 November 1877, and designed by Basil Manly Wilkerson, known for his dental inventions.

== Description ==
In the 1882 edition of Codman and Shurtleff's catalogue, the chair is referred to as "showing great originality,... all cranks are dispensed with and levers substituted for them." The chair was raised by a foot lever ("requires very little effort, and occupies but 8 seconds") and lowered by another lever ("sinks rapidly and noiselessly"). Other levers allowed the chair to rotate ("through the whole circle") and rock back and forth. In addition, minor movements were possible, such as the raising or lowering of the back and headrest, slight rocking of the seat ("to prevent the patient from sliding forward"), footstool length and height adjustment, and the small of the back support (which converted into "a capital child's seat"). The upholstery could be ordered in either green or garnet plush fabric or in leather. The price was $177.

Improvements in the 1899 model enabled a patient to lie in a horizontal position, and included a spittoon.
