= Saint John's Methodist Episcopal Church (Kingman, Arizona) =

Historic church building in Kingman, Arizona

- U.S. National Register of Historic Places
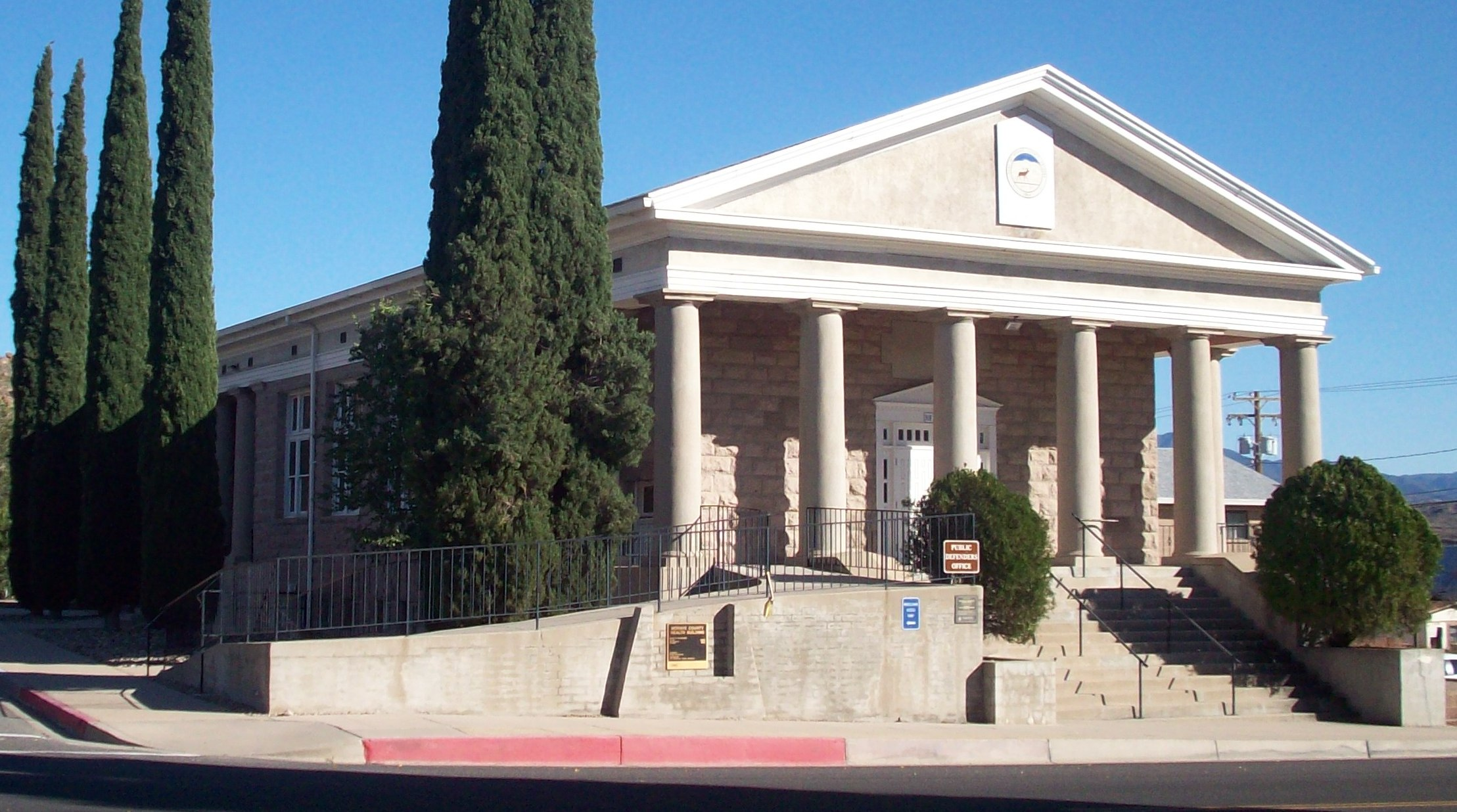

- Location within Arizona Location within the United States
- Location: 318 N 5th St., Kingman, Arizona
- Coordinates: 35°11′28.5″N 114°03′02.8″W
- Built: 1917
- Architectural style: Greek Revival
- MPS: Kingman MRA
- NRHP reference No.: 86001170
- Added to NRHP: May 14, 1986

Saint John's Methodist Episcopal Church is a historic church building in Kingman, Arizona on the National Register of Historic Places. It is significant for its unique architecture. It is no longer used as a church. It is also notable as the location of the 1939 marriage of film actors Clark Gable and Carole Lombard.

== History ==
The church was built at the corner of Spring and Fifth streets in Kingman, Arizona. It is one block away from Route 66. St. John's is the oldest organized religious group in Kingman and this is its second building. The church was built in 1917, in the Greek Revival style. Construction started on February 28, 1917. The first church service was on May 8, 1889. The church was added to the National Register of Historic Places in 1986.

== Architecture ==
The one story building measures 45 by 95 feet (14 m × 29 m) and is constructed of local tufa limestone on a stone foundation with a gable roof. The basement is partially above ground; a wide imposing tone staircase rises from ground level to the first floor. The main entry is recessed behind a front porch supported by six Tuscan columns. The entry has sidelights on both sides and a transom above topped with a pediment. The north side has four sets of three light double-hung windows with transoms, while the south side has individual one-over-one double-hung windows. The building is significant for its architecture which complements the nearby Mohave County Courthouse, which was built two years earlier and of the same material. While built during the Neo-Classical Revival period, it is of the Classic Roman Temple form. It is the best example of such a building in Arizona, which were not common in the timeframe in which it was constructed. The construction date of 1917 is known from the building's cornerstone.

== Gable-Lombard marriage ==
On March 29, 1939, Clark Gable and Carole Lombard eloped to Kingman and were married in the church while on a break from the filming of Gone With the Wind. The service was conducted by the minister of the church, two strangers were the witnesses, and Gable's close friend Otto Winkler, an MGM press agent, was the best man.

== Present ==
On a 1984 survey for the Arizona State Historic Property Inventory, the building was listed as original/unaltered and in good/well-maintained condition. At that time, it was still in use as a church.

As of 2020, it was being used for a Mohave County Office of the Public Defender.

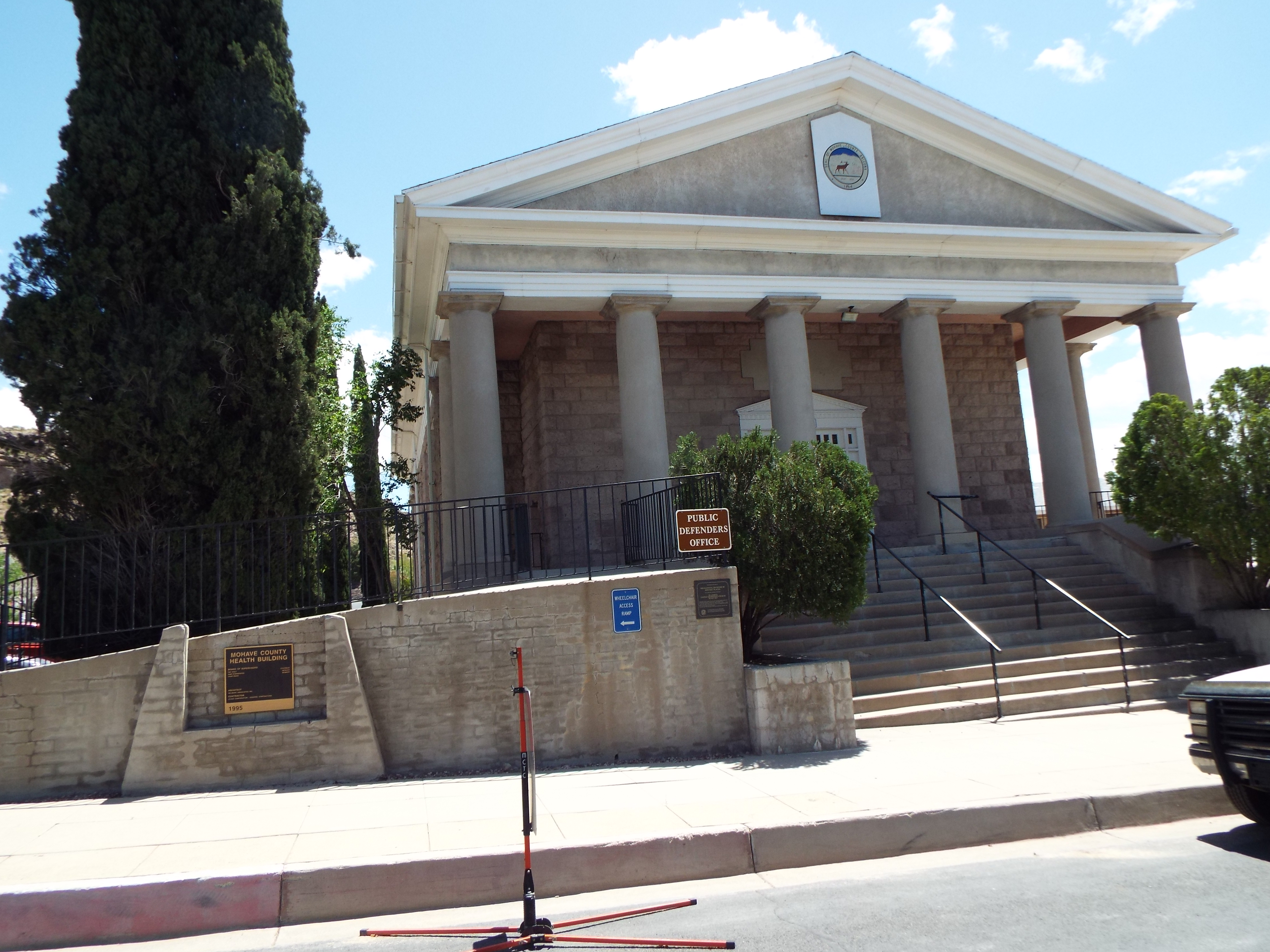
The building in 2019
