= Kingman Army Air Forces Flexible Gunnery School Radio Tower =

- U.S. National Register of Historic Places
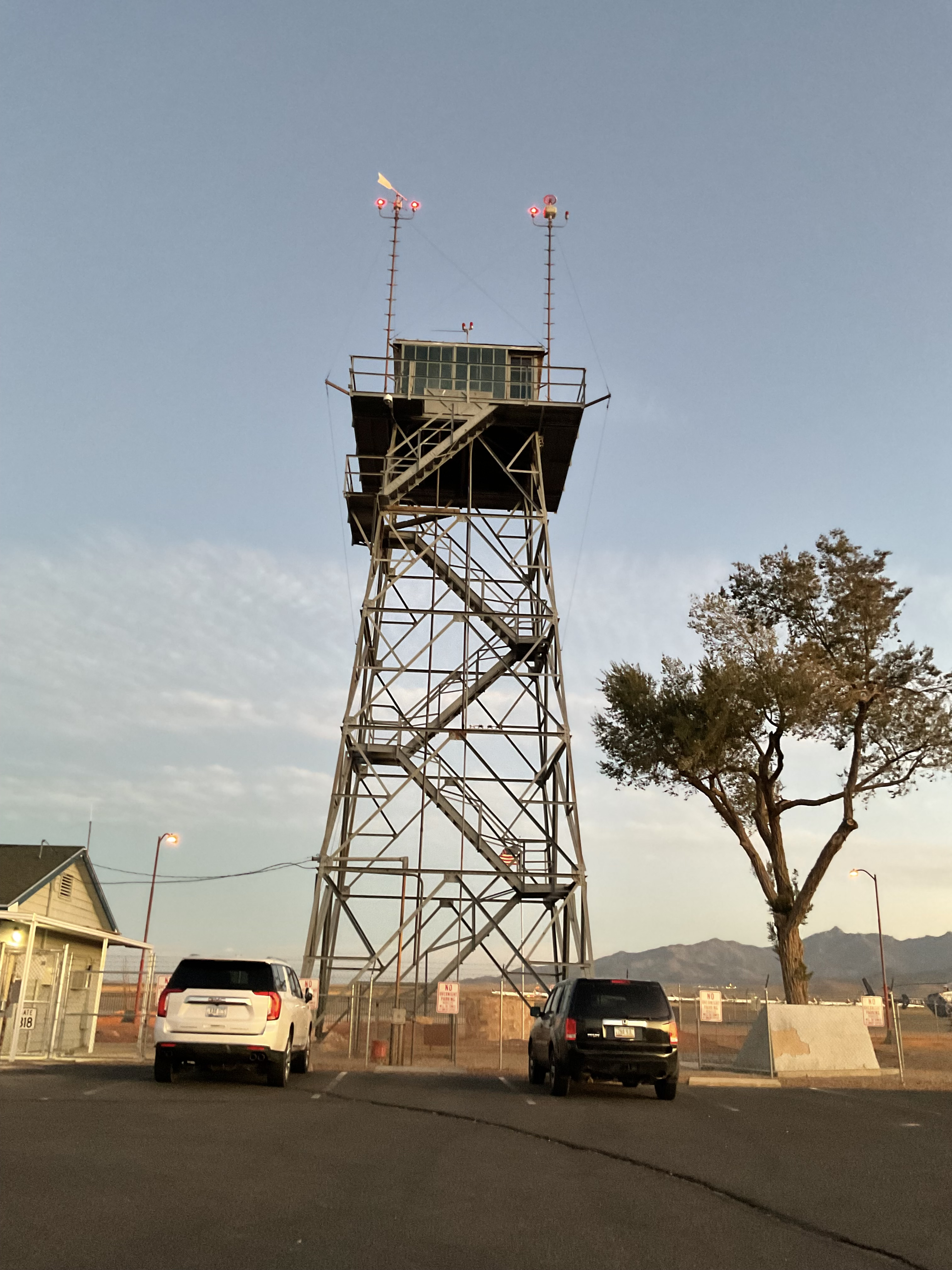
- The tower in 2024

- Location within Arizona Location within the United States
- Location: 7000 Flightline Dr. Kingman, Arizona
- Coordinates: 35°15′31″N 113°56′38″W
- Area: less than one acre
- Built: 1943
- Built by: US Army Corps of Engineers
- Architectural style: Steel radio tower
- NRHP reference No.: 99000107
- Added to NRHP: February 5, 1999

The Kingman Army Air Forces Flexible Gunnery School Radio Tower, at 7000 Flightline Dr. in Kingman, Arizona is a historic structure built by the U.S. Army Corps of Engineers in 1943. It is a steel radio tower that has also been known as Kingman Army Air Field Radio Tower and as Storage Depot #41 Radio Tower. It was listed on the National Register of Historic Places in 1999.

It is a 54-foot (16 m) tall "Airdrome Traffic Control" (ATC) tower that was built to control air traffic at the Kingman Army Air Forces (KAAF) Flexible Gunnery School. It has a 14-by-14-foot (4.3 m × 4.3 m) "cab" with a hip roof. In 1988, the cab was empty and the tower was surrounded by fencing.

It was believed to be one of only two ATCs of its type surviving in the United States.

It is located in what in 1988 was known as the Kingman Airport and Industrial Park.
