= Peach Spring Tuff =

Pyroclastic flow sheet deposit

- Stratigraphic range: Miocene, 18.78 Ma
- Type: Ignimbrite
- Area: 32000 km^2

Location
- Country: United States
- Extent: Arizona, California, Nevada

Type section
- Named for: Peach Spring, Arizona
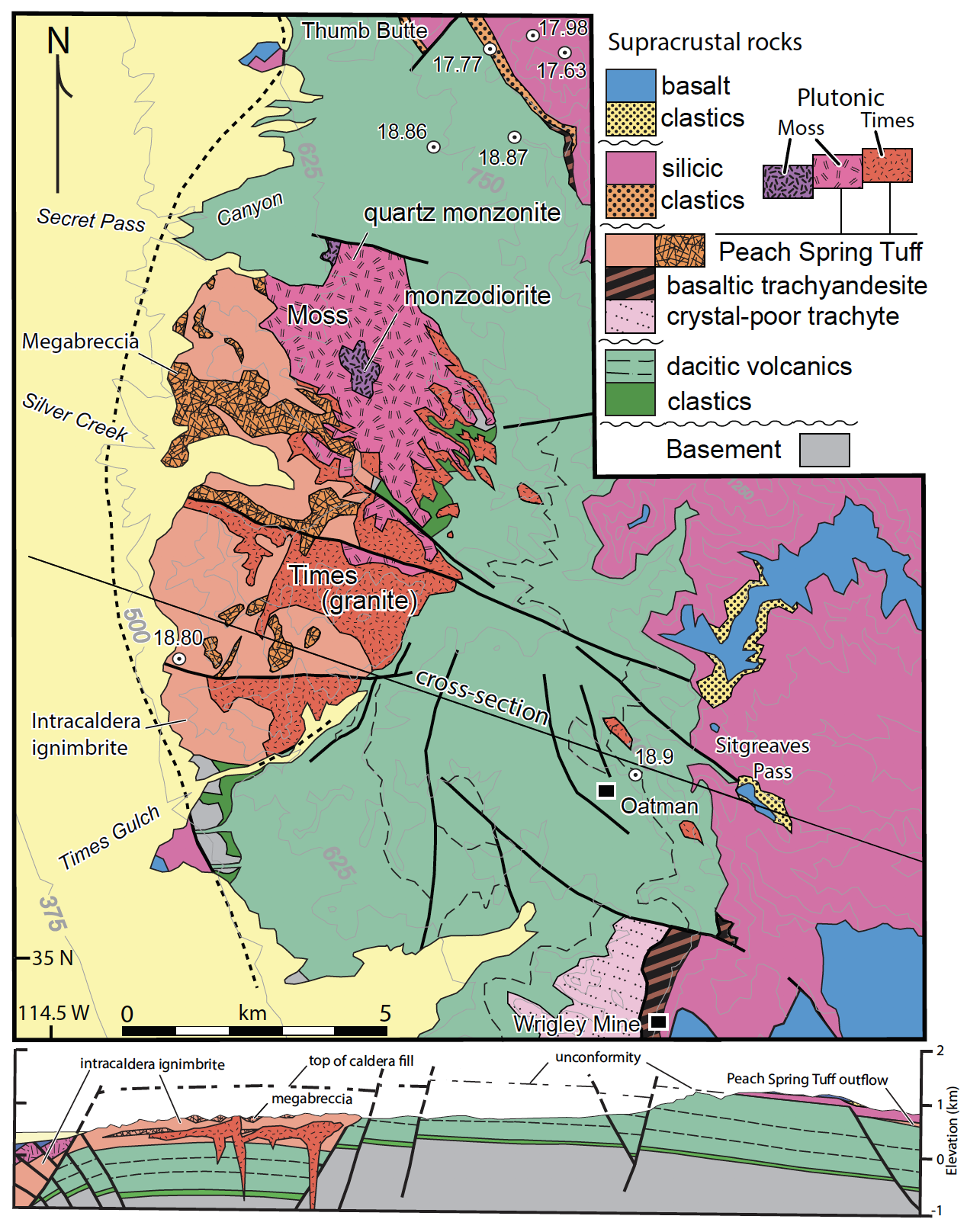
- Geologic Map and Cross Section of the Silver Creek Caldera in Oatman, Arizona.

The Peach Spring Tuff is a pyroclastic flow sheet deposit spanning 32,000 km^{2} in California, Arizona, and Nevada. The source of the Peach Spring Tuff is the Silver Creek Caldera located outside of Oatman, AZ. The Silver Creek Caldera was found to be a match to the Peach Spring Tuff after an ignimbrite sample from within the caldera matched the phenocryst makeup and age of the Peach Spring Tuff. The caldera eruption is dated to the early Miocene, radiometrically dated to 18.78 +/- 0.02 Ma using argon-argon dating methods on sanidine crystals. The Peach Spring Tuff has a rhyolitic composition with thickness ranging from 10-140 m depending on location. The Peach Spring Tuff is the only geologic evidence of a super-eruption in this region.

== Tectonic Setting ==
The 32,000 km^{2} area containing the Peach Spring Tuff overlies multiple tectonic environments including a stable plateau, a normal faulting transition zone, a basin and region, the Colorado River Extensional Corridor, and a strike slip region. There is evidence that prior to the eruption that resulted in the Peach Spring Tuff there was uplift of the Colorado Plateau that exposed erosional surfaces underlying the Peach Spring Tuff and provided drainage slopes that impacted the direction of eruptive flow.

== Magmatic System ==
Data indicates that the magma body that erupted resulting in the Peach Spring Tuff was compositionally and texturally zoned, as well as zoned by temperature. The textural difference and transition from low to high silica content between intra-caldera ignimbrite and the Peach Spring Tuff indicates a shift from crystal-poor rhyolite to crystal-rich trachyte during the eruption. This transition can be assumed because the intra-caldera ignimbrite would have been the last to be erupted. The textural and compositional shift represents a zoned magma body because the first material to erupt is slightly different than the last material, indicating change from shallow magma to deep magma.

=== Silver Creek Caldera ===
The span of the Peach Spring Tuff indicates that it resulted from a significant eruption, likely forming a large caldera in the process. It wasn't until 2008 that the Silver Creek Caldera was suggested as the source caldera for the Peach Spring Tuff. The Silver Creek Caldera is distinguished by a 450m trachyte ignimbrite that petrologically and geochemically match that of the Peach Spring Tuff. The major differences between the Peach Spring Tuff and the ignimbrite of the Silver Creek Caldera is that the majority of the Peach Spring Tuff is rhyolitic while the ignimbrite is trachytic, indicating the SiO_{2} content in the Peach Spring Tuff is higher than that of the ignimbrite.

	Intra-Caldera Ignimbrite	Peach Spring Tuff
SiO2 Content	65-68%	68-76%
Phenocryst Content	~ 35%	4-20%

=== Petrology ===
The Peach Spring Tuff shows 5 different zones through textural differences as a result of thermal zoning in the caldera magma chamber. Phenocrysts of sanidine, plagioclase, biotite, amphibole, pyroxene, and the occasional quartz build between 4 and 14% of the Peach Spring Tuff composition; titanite, zircon, and apatite have also been found. The first four zones contain these lower percentages of phenocrysts while an increase can be seen in zone 5, the uppermost zone. From zone 1 to zone 4 there is an increase in phenocrysts within the pumice from 5% to 11% while from zone 4 to zone 5 there is an increase to between 18% and 23%, measured volumetrically.

Feldspar Phenocrysts in the Peach Spring Tuff
Phenocryst	Crystal Size	Ratio in Zones 1-4	Ratio in Zone 5
Sanidine	2mm-5mm	2	1
Plagioclase	0.1mm-2mm	1	1

Zone 5 of the Peach Spring Tuff is trachytic while the underlying zones are rhyolitic. This trachytic zone is most compositionally similar to the intra-caldera ignimbrite.
