= Lewis Kingman =

American civil engineer (1845-1912)

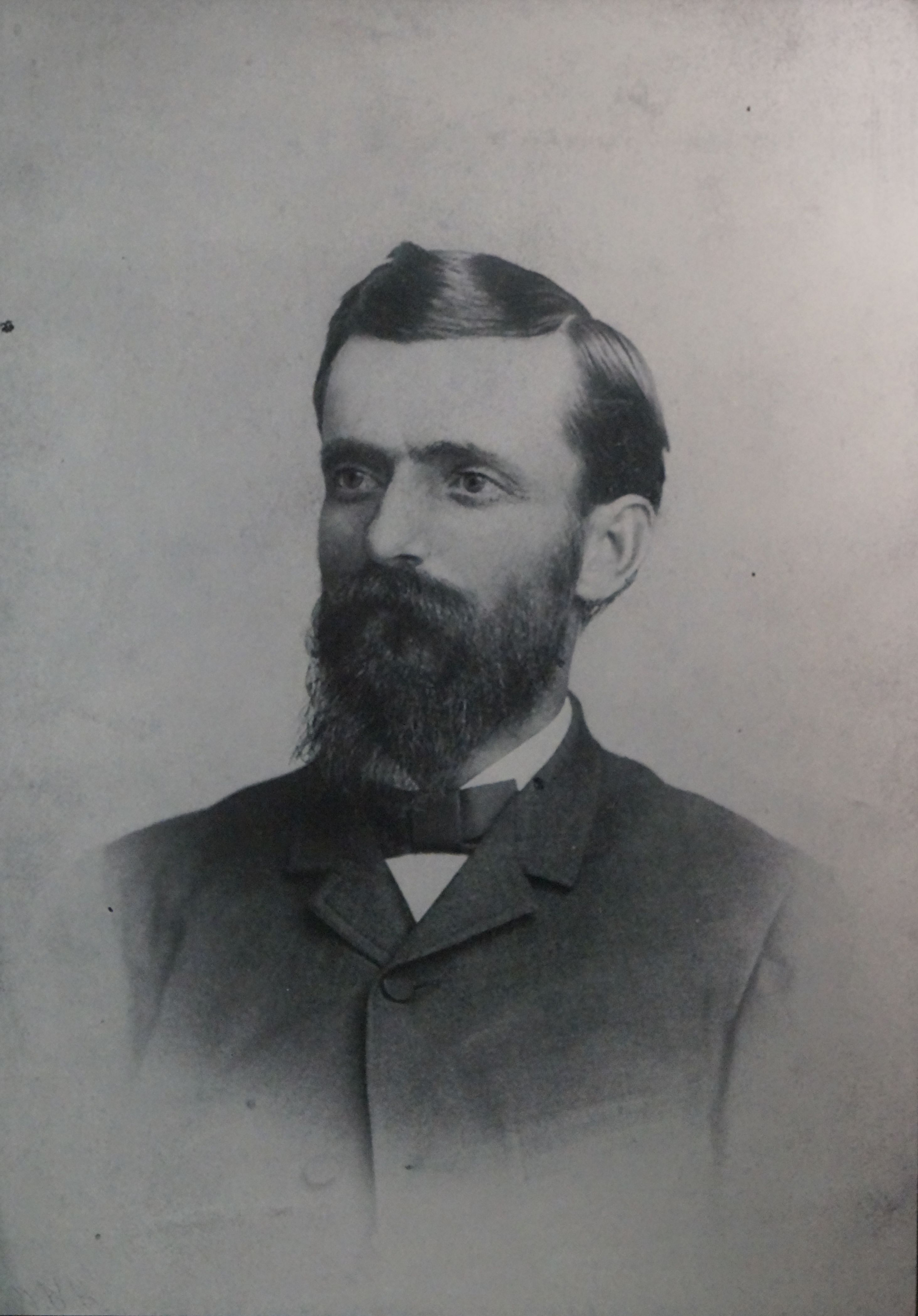
Levis Kingman 1845-1912

Lewis Kingman (February 26, 1845 – January 23, 1912) was a civil engineer, who surveyed and built several thousands of miles of railroad lines.

== Biography ==
Lewis Kingman was born in North Bridgewater, Massachusetts (today known as Brockton, Massachusetts) on February 26, 1845 to Isaac Kingman and Sibil Ames. He studied engineering with Shedd & Edison, a civil engineering company in Boston, Massachusetts. Initially, he worked in the oil fields of Pennsylvania, but later turned his sights towards the railroads.

In 1868 he began to work at the Atlantic and Pacific Railroad and was responsible for building lines in Missouri, Kansas, Colorado and Mexico. In 1880 he surveyed and built the line from Flagstaff to Needles through what became Kingman, Arizona. Kingman, Arizona was named after him, as he had brought transportation and subsequently settlement to isolated areas.

He died suddenly in Mexico City, Mexico on January 22, 1912, leaving a wife, four sons, and a daughter.
