= List of historic properties in Winslow, Arizona =

- Town
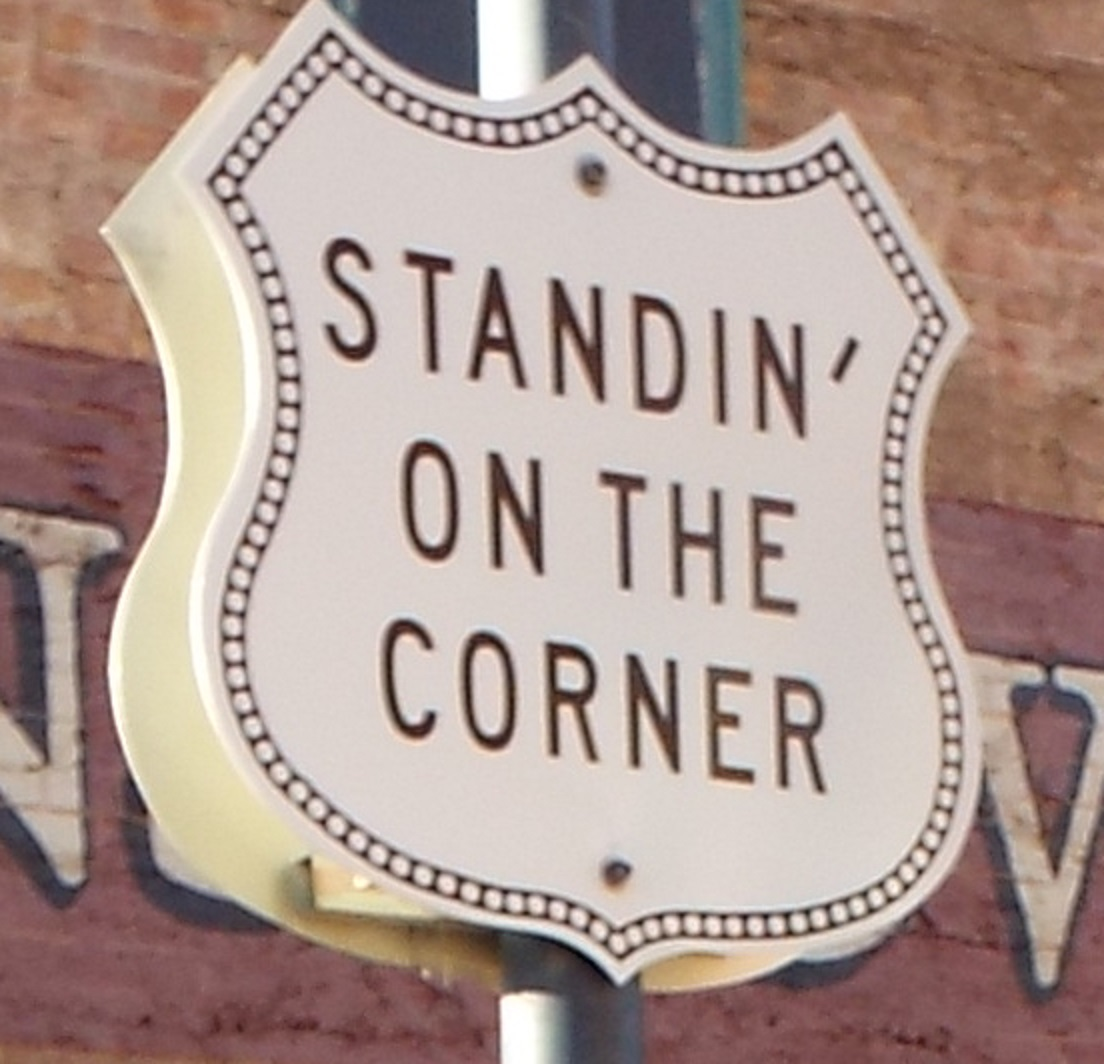
- Standing on the Corner sign

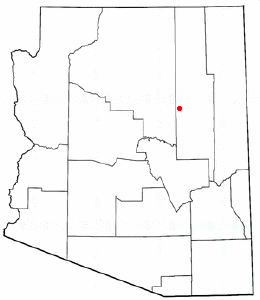
- Map of Winslow in the Navajo County of the state of Arizona

This is a list, which includes a photographic gallery, of some of the remaining historic structures and monuments in Winslow, Arizona, some of which are listed in the National Register of Historic Places. Also, included is a photographic gallery of Brigham City, which is listed in the National Register of Historic Places and the Meteor Crater, which is designated a National Natural Landmark.

== Brief history ==
Winslow was founded in 1882 as a railroad town. It was named after General Edward F. Winslow, President of the St. Louis & Southwestern Railway. By 1957, railroad travel had all but stopped. The now historical Route 66 (a.k.a. "The Mother Road"), was established in 1926, passing through the middle of the town in what is now Second Street. Travel by motorist on the historic route lessened with the construction of interstate 40.

Winslow has two districts, four individual structures and one archaeological site listed in the National Register of Historic Places. They are the following:

== Brigham City in Winslow ==
Brigham City is a ghost town which is now located within the boundary of Winslow along the Little Colorado River. Established in 1876, and organized as a Latter-Day Saints ward in 1878. Flash flooding that washed away the dams and irrigation systems led to crop failures and caused the abandonment of the town by 1881. Brigham City was added to the National Register of Historic Places on June 9, 1978.

== The Historic Preservation Commission of Winslow ==
The Historic Preservation Commission of Winslow is the agency in charge of identifying, preserving the towns historical structures. The commission is also in charge of nominating those structures which are considered historical to be listed in the National Register of Historic Places. The Historic Preservation Commission of Winslow is located at 115 E. Second Street. Just because a property is listed in the NRHP it does not mean that the property is safe from being demolished by its owner. According to Jim McPherson, Arizona Preservation Foundation Board President: "It is crucial that residents, private interests, and government officials act now to save these elements of our cultural heritage before it is too late."

== Take It Easy" ==
In 1972, the Eagles, an American rock band, recorded the song "Take It Easy" which became a hit. The song includes he following verse: "Standing on the Corner in Winslow, Arizona". Since then the corner has become a tourist attraction. The corner and a statue are located in the intersection of Second and Kinsley Streets.

== Historic Districts ==
- The Winslow Commercial Historic District which was listed in the National Register of Historic Places on April 20, 1989, reference #89000316. Roughly bounded by 3rd, Williamson Ave., 1st, and Warren Ave.
- The Winslow Residential Historic District which was listed in the National Register of Historic Places on April 28, 1989, reference #89000296. Roughly bounded by Kinsley Ave. from Oak to Aspinwall

== Historic structures ==
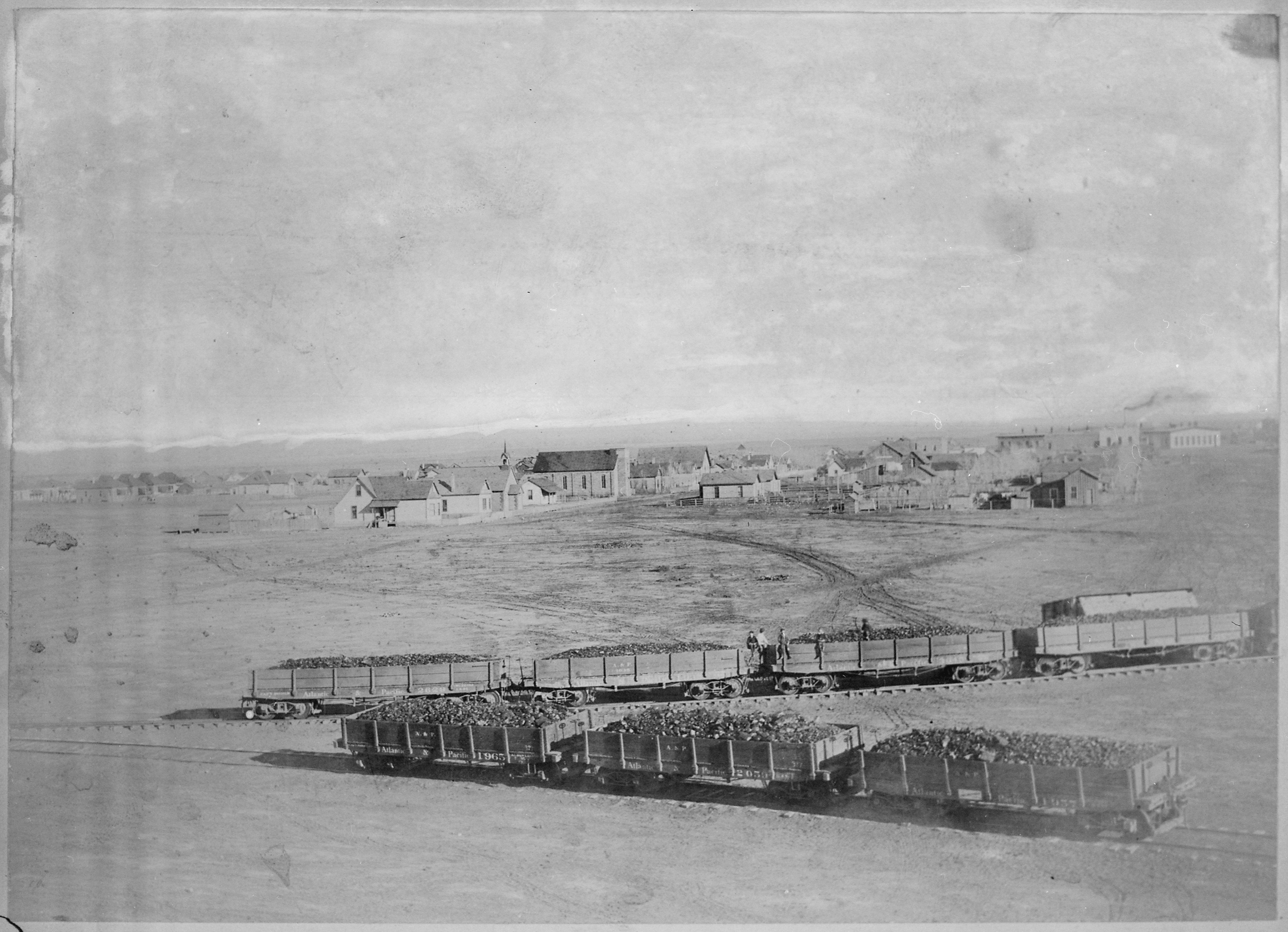
Birds-eye view of Winslow (looking East), 1890. Atlantic and Pacific Railway cars on converging tracks in the foreground.

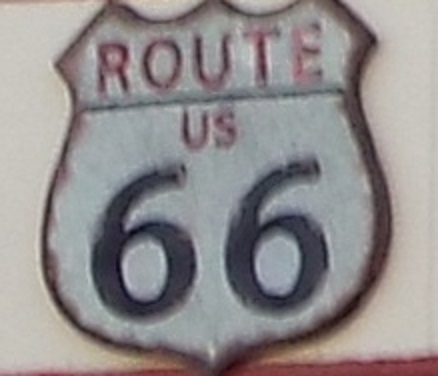
Iconic Route 66 sign in Winslow

The following is a brief description of some of the historic structures in Winslow including those which the Historic Preservation Commission of Winslow has considered historical.

- The Lorenzo Hubbell Trading Post and Warehouse – The structure was built in 1900 and is located at 523 W. Second Street. John Lorenzo Hubbell began building Navajo trading posts in Arizona and New Mexico in the late 1800s. He played an instrumental role in bridging the gap between the Caucasian (White) settlers and the Navajo people. It was listed in the National Register of Historic Places November 21, 2002, Ref. #02001383.
- The La Posada Hotel – The hotel was built in 1929 and is located at 200 E. Second Street. This hotel is the last of the Harvey Hotel's. Inside of the hotel is one of two restaurants who claim to have created the chimichanga. The other restaurant is El Trover at the Grand Canyon. The hotel also served as the offices of the Santa Fe Railroad. It was listed in the National Register of Historic Places March 31, 1992, Ref.#92000256.
- The Winslow Underpass – The underpass was built in 1925 and is located in Route 87 MP 342. It was listed in the National Register of Historic Places September 30, 1988, Ref. #88001610.
- The Winslow Bridge – The bridge was built in 1925 and is located in Route 87 MP 344. It was listed in the National Register of Historic Places March 31, 1989, Ref. #88001611.
- Arcadia Hall – This 5,000 square foot building was constructed in 1920 and is located at 104 E. First Street. It is the last historic structure left on First Street. Originally Arcadia Hall served Northern Arizona as a music and dance venue. In the 1920s and 30s, it was the gathering place for many dance contests and was once described as the most elegant ballroom between the Pacific Coast and Albuquerque. It has been described as originally having ornate chandeliers and an orchestra pit for the Big Band Music that was sweeping the nation. The hall could be rented for local events and frequently was the home of Northern Arizona high school proms and special events for Winslow's nonprofit community organizations. As the musical tastes of young people changed hands from Big Band orchestras to smaller, electrified rock and roll bands, so did Arcadia Hall change hands. The building became the Desert Scene Elks Club, Chapter 1267 of the I.B.P.O.E., the Improved Benevolent Protectorate Of Elks. On Saturday, August 20, 1966, the building was the location of the fourth public performance of the Jackson 5. The Tribune reported that the Jackson 5, Michael, Marlon, Jackie, Tito, Jermaine, ranged in age from 7 to 14 years old, and were accompanied on drums by Gault from Gary, Indiana. Tickets for the show cost $1.25 (equivalent to $12 in 2025). The Jackson 5 soon after skyrocketed to international stardom. Desert Scene Elks Club also was the location of the first performance by Arizona Blues Hall of Fame winner Tommy Dukes.
- The St. Joseph Parish – was built in 1900 and is located at 220 W. Second Street.
- The Navajo County Bank Building – was built in 1904 and is located on the intersection of Second and Kinsley Streets.
- The U.S. Post Office – was built in 1935 and is located at 219 Williamson Avenue. Included in the Winslow Commercial Historic District.
- The site which inspired Standing on the Corner in Winslow Arizona (WHC).
- The Winslow–Lindbergh Regional Airport Hangar – was built in 1929 and is located in 701 Airport Road. The Winslow–Lindbergh Regional Airport was originally called the Barringan Airport. Both the airport and hangar were built by the Transcontinental Air Transport in 1929. The airport is named in honor of Charles Lindbergh who flew the inaugural flight into Winslow for Transcontinental Air Transport (TAT) that same year. The airport is dedicated to the memory of Melvin L. Kislingbury, a Winslow resident who was killed in a WW II flight mission in Louisiana in 1943.
- The "Tiny Church of the Mother Road" – The church was built in 2012 and is located at 116 East Second Street. It is officially known as the smallest church on Route 66. However, there is a sign by the church which claims that it is the smallest church in the world.

== Historic structures pictured ==
Historic buildings and structures in Winslow
(NRHP = National Register of Historic Places)
(WHC = Winslow Historical Commission)
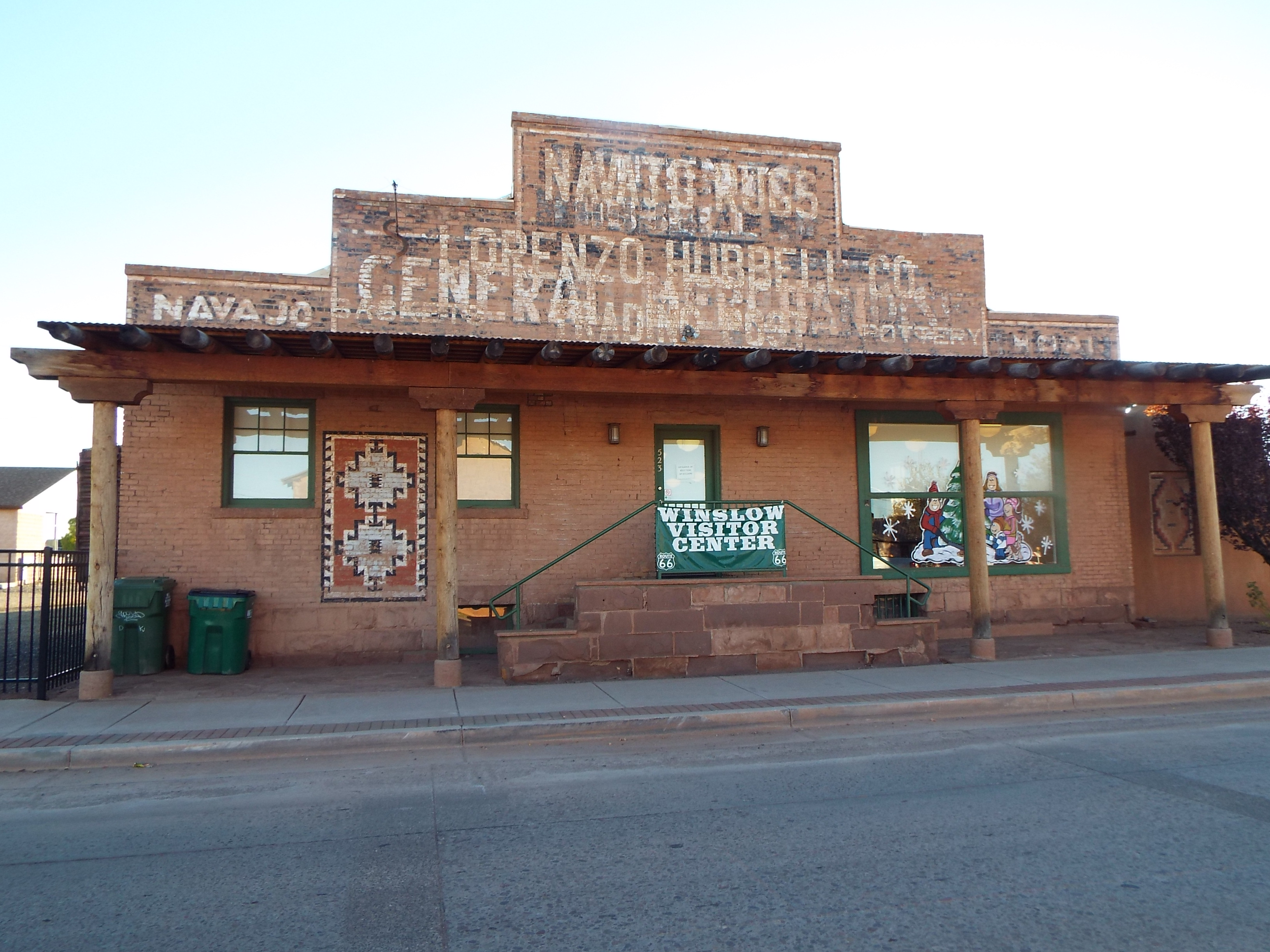
The Lorenzo Hubbell Trading Post and Warehouse – 1900 (NRHP).

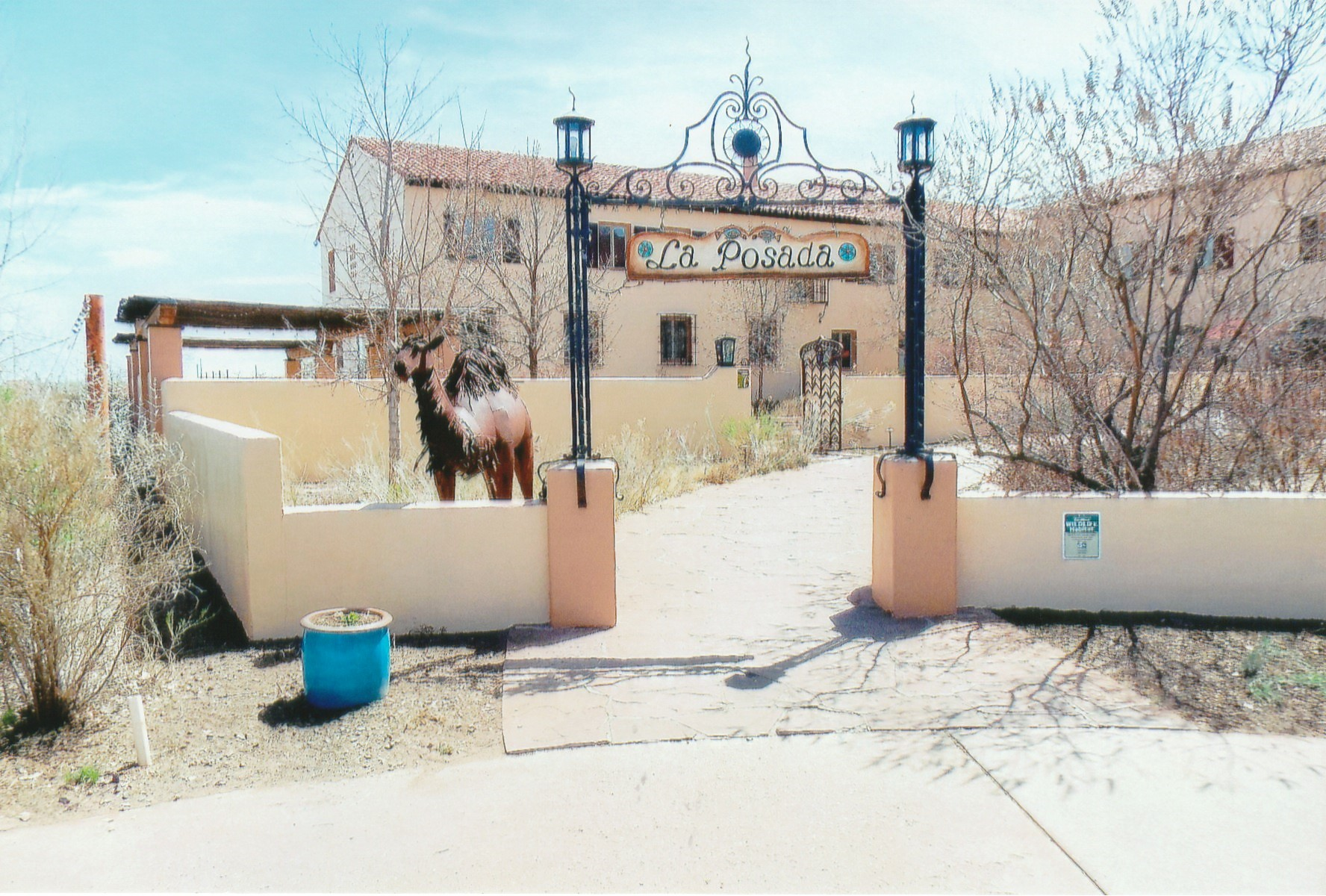
La Posada Hotel – 1929 entrance.

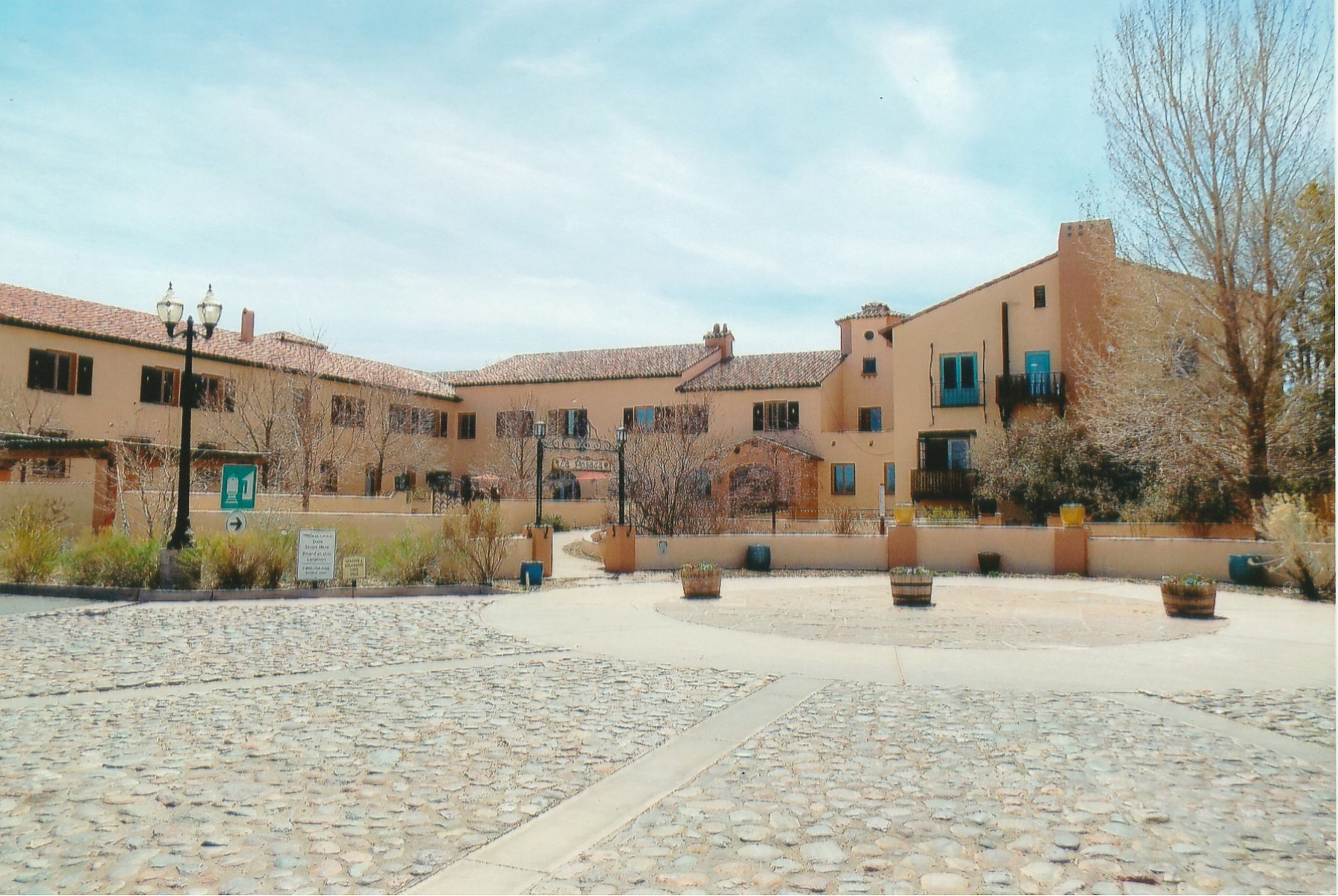
The La Posada Hotel – 1929

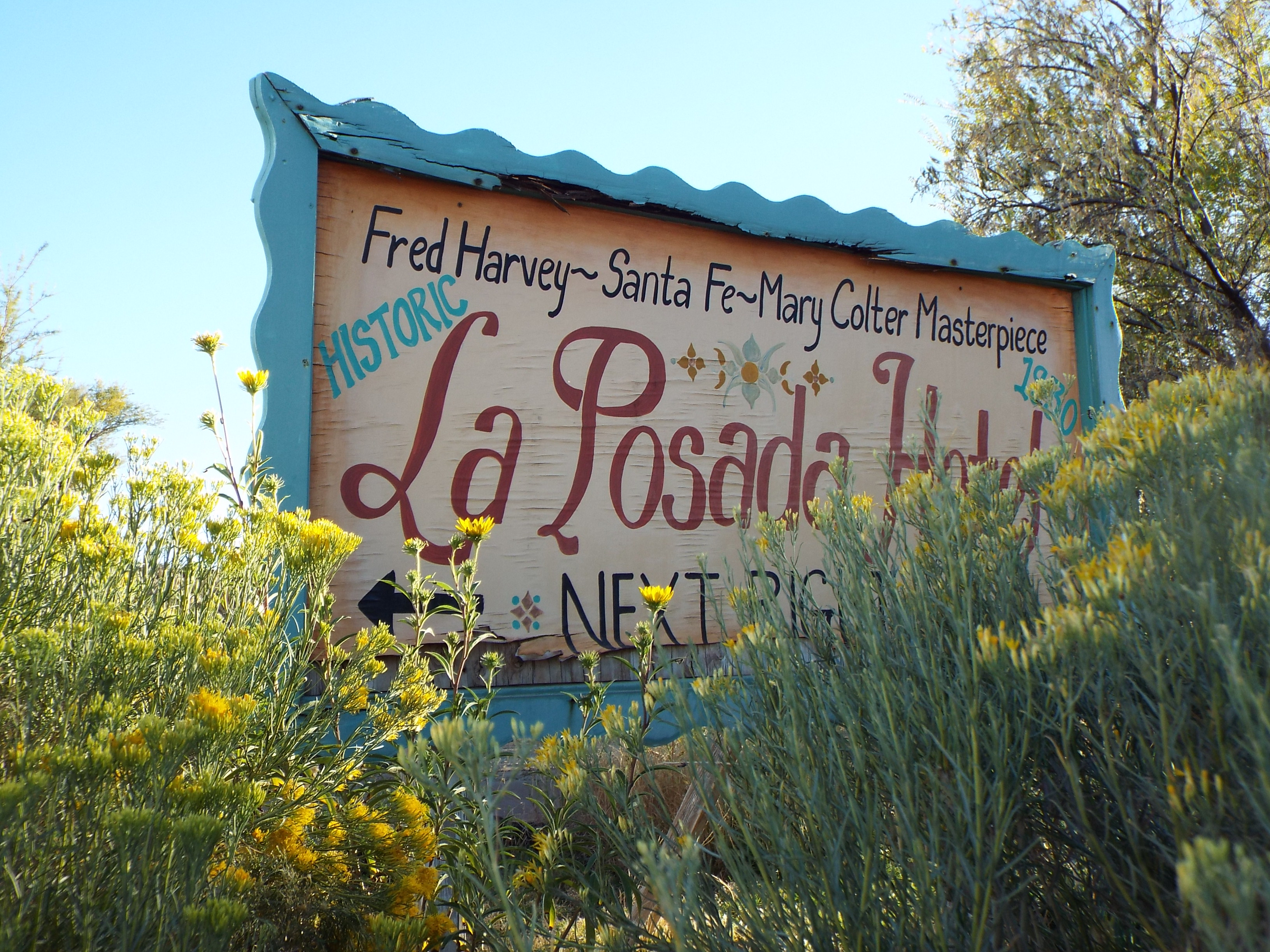
Old sign of La Posada Hotel – 1929 (NRHP).

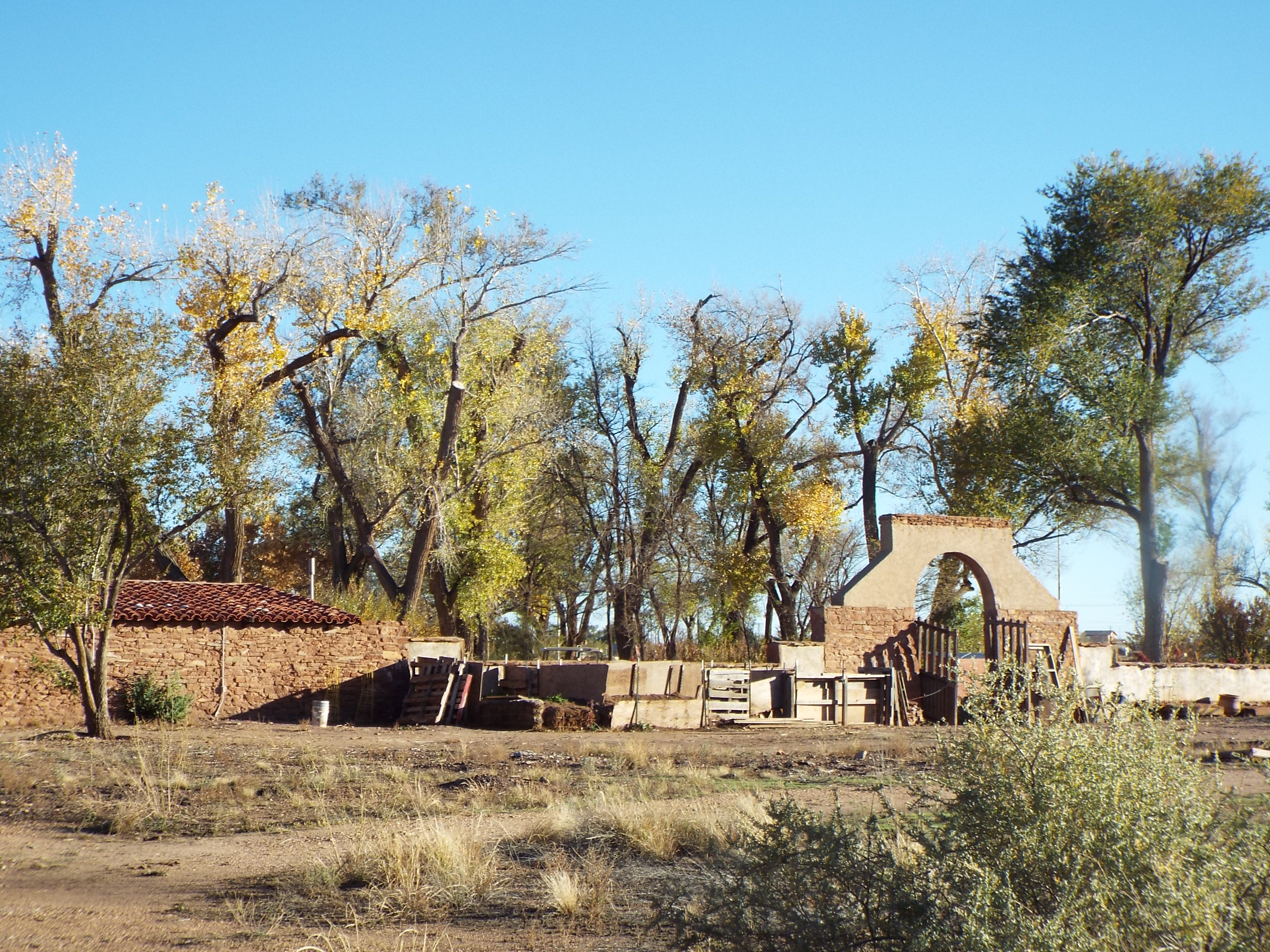
The La Posada Hotel – 1929.

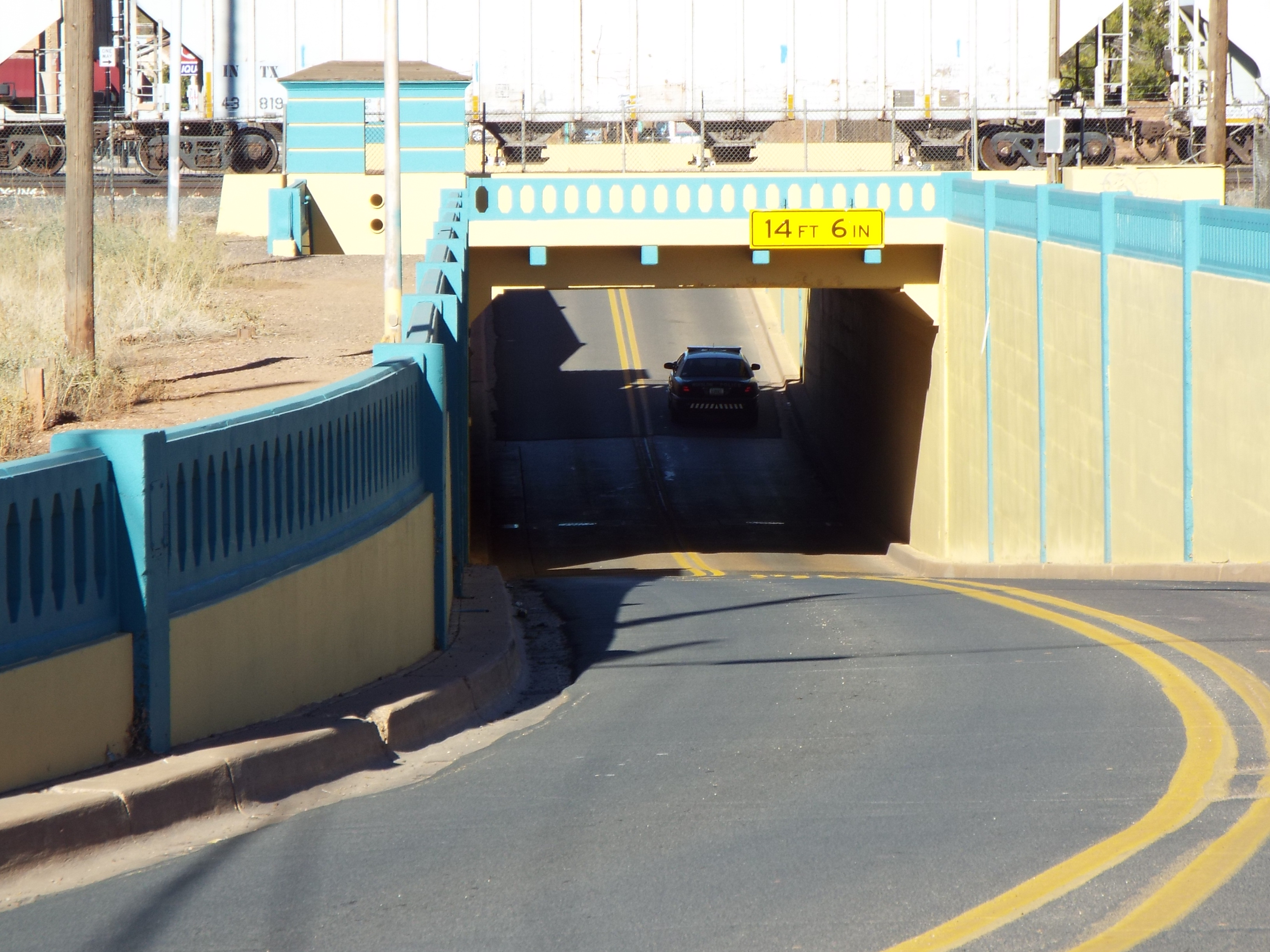
The Winslow Underpass – 1925 (NRHP).

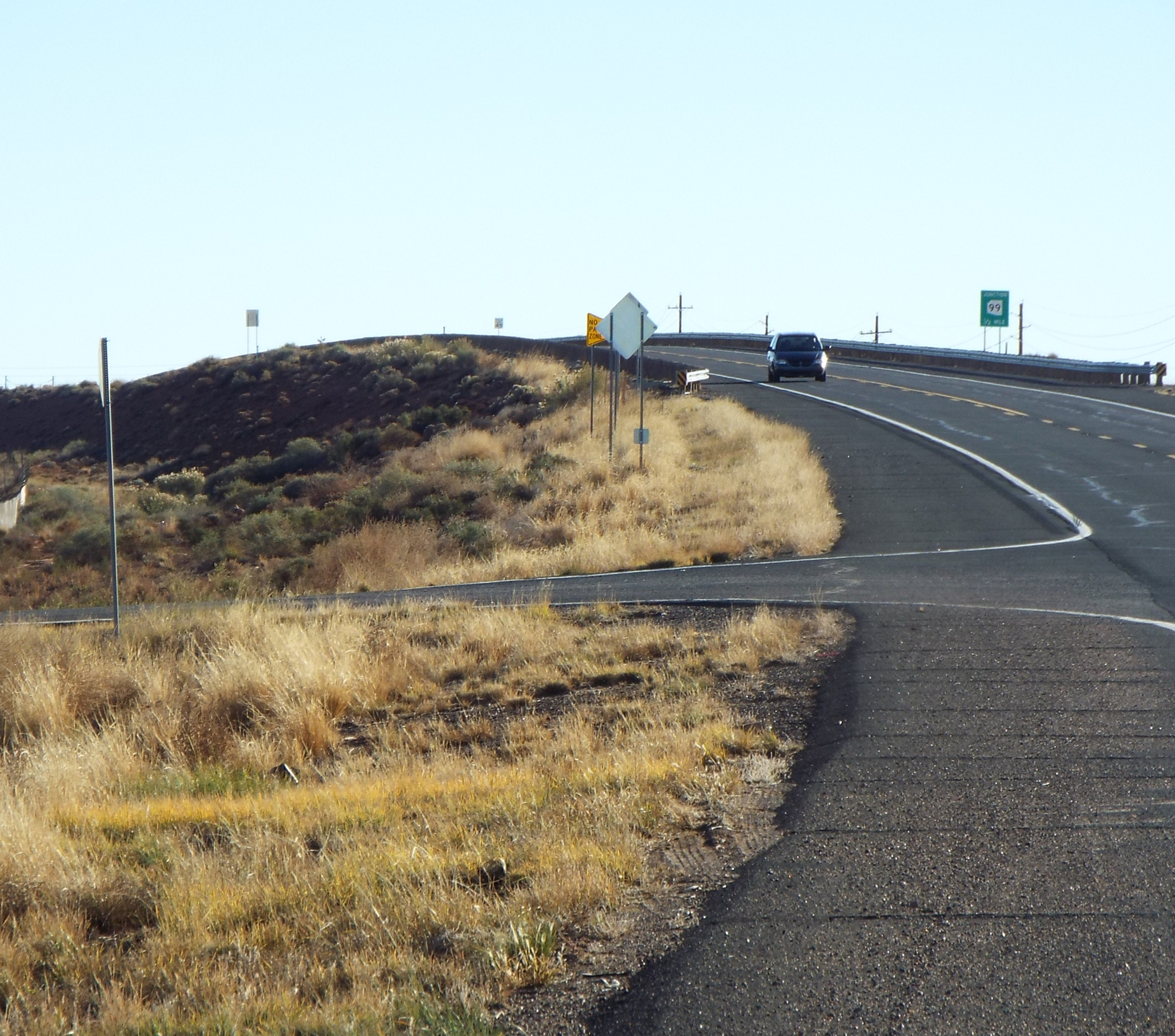
The Winslow Bridge – 1925 (NRHP).

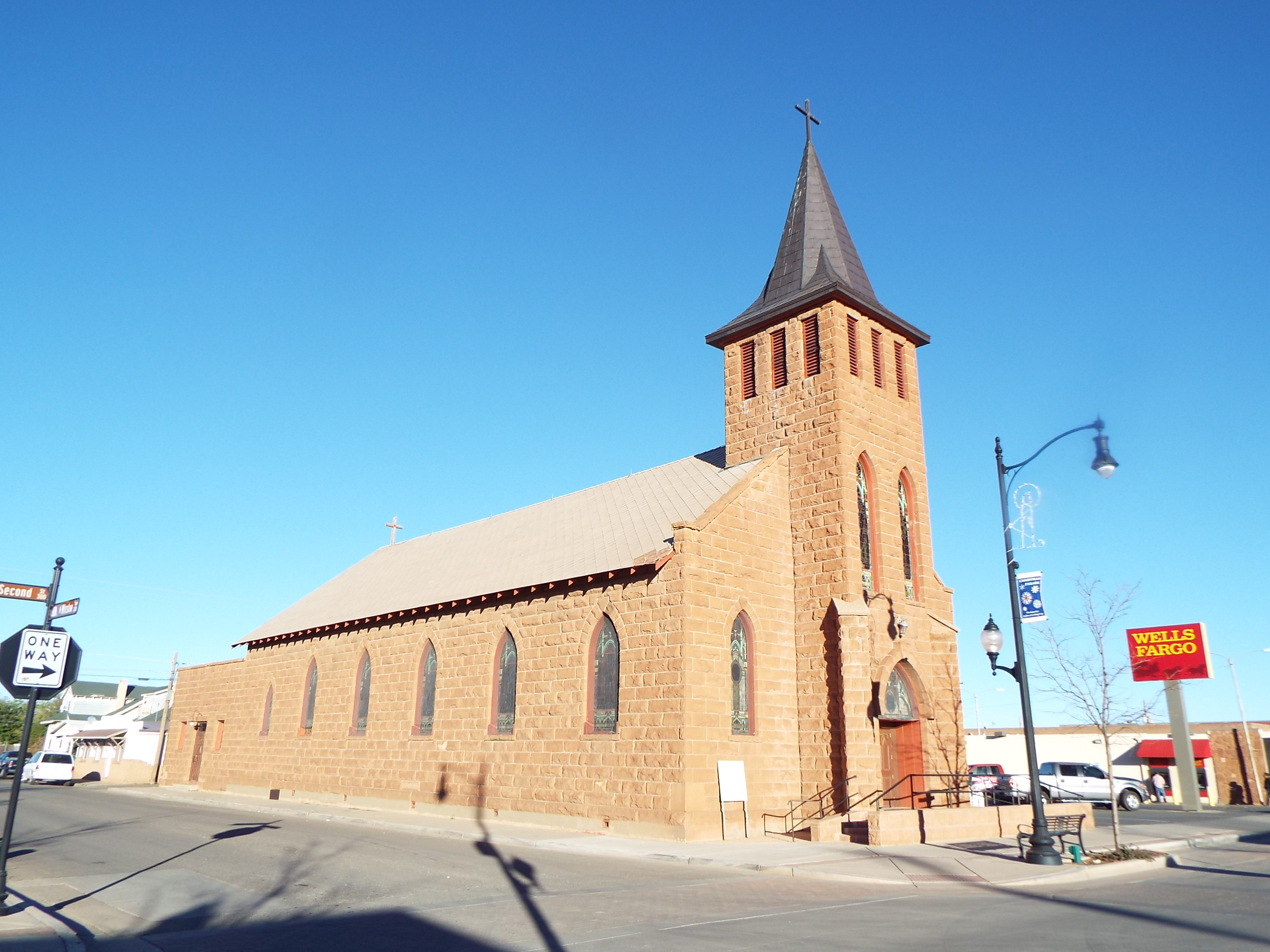
The St. Joseph Parish – 1900 (WHC).

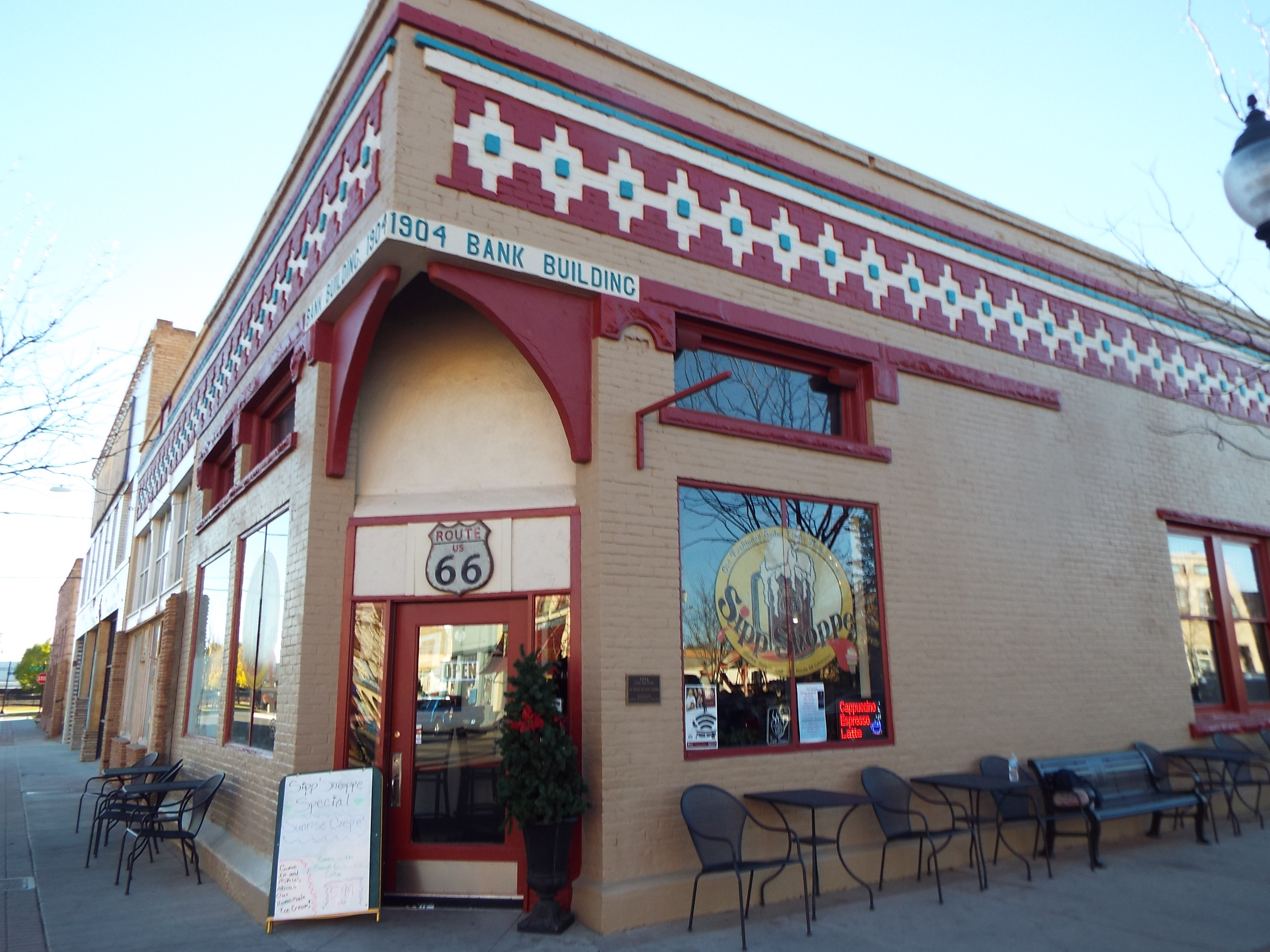
The Navajo County Bank Building – 1904 (WHC).

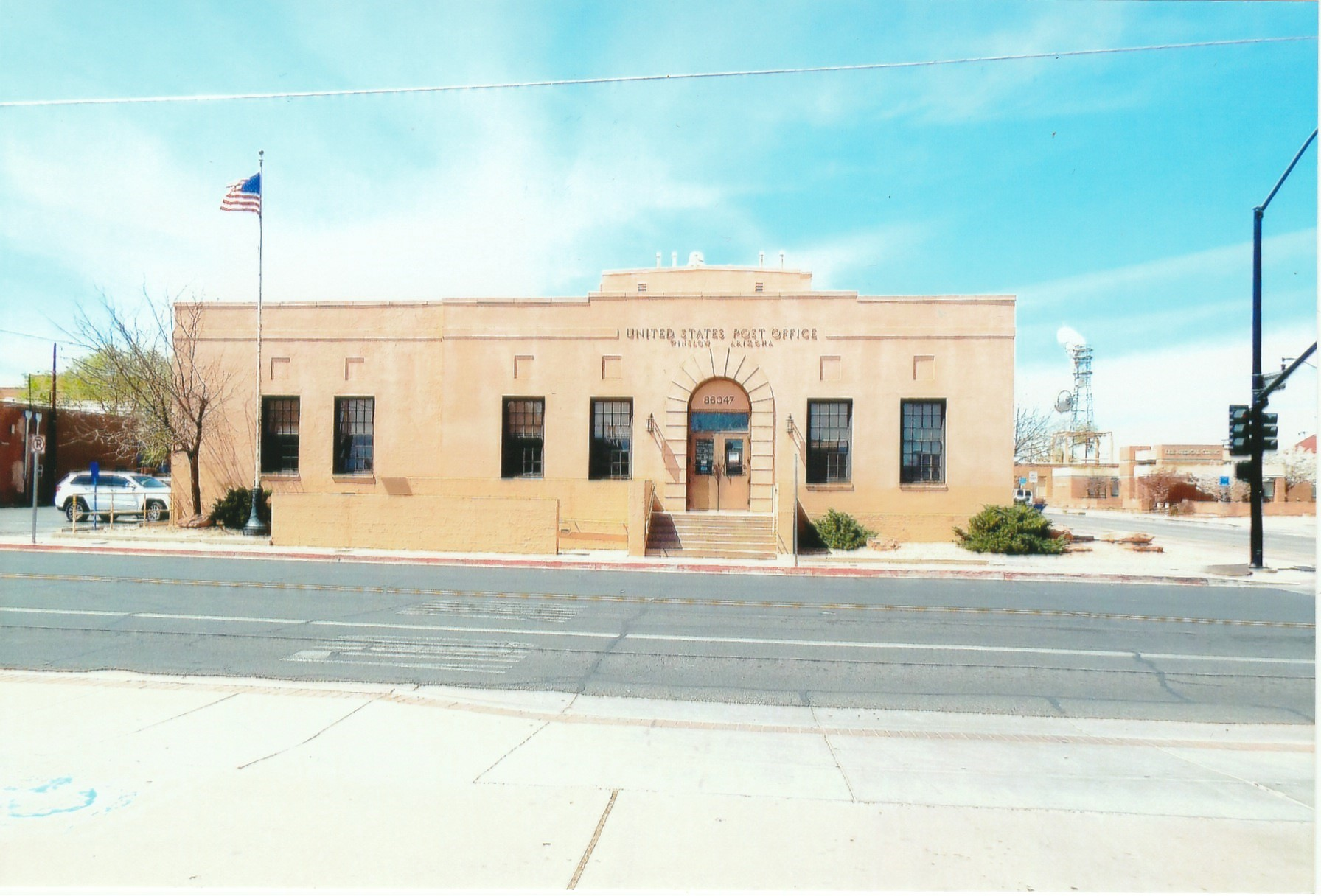
The U.S. Post Office – 1935

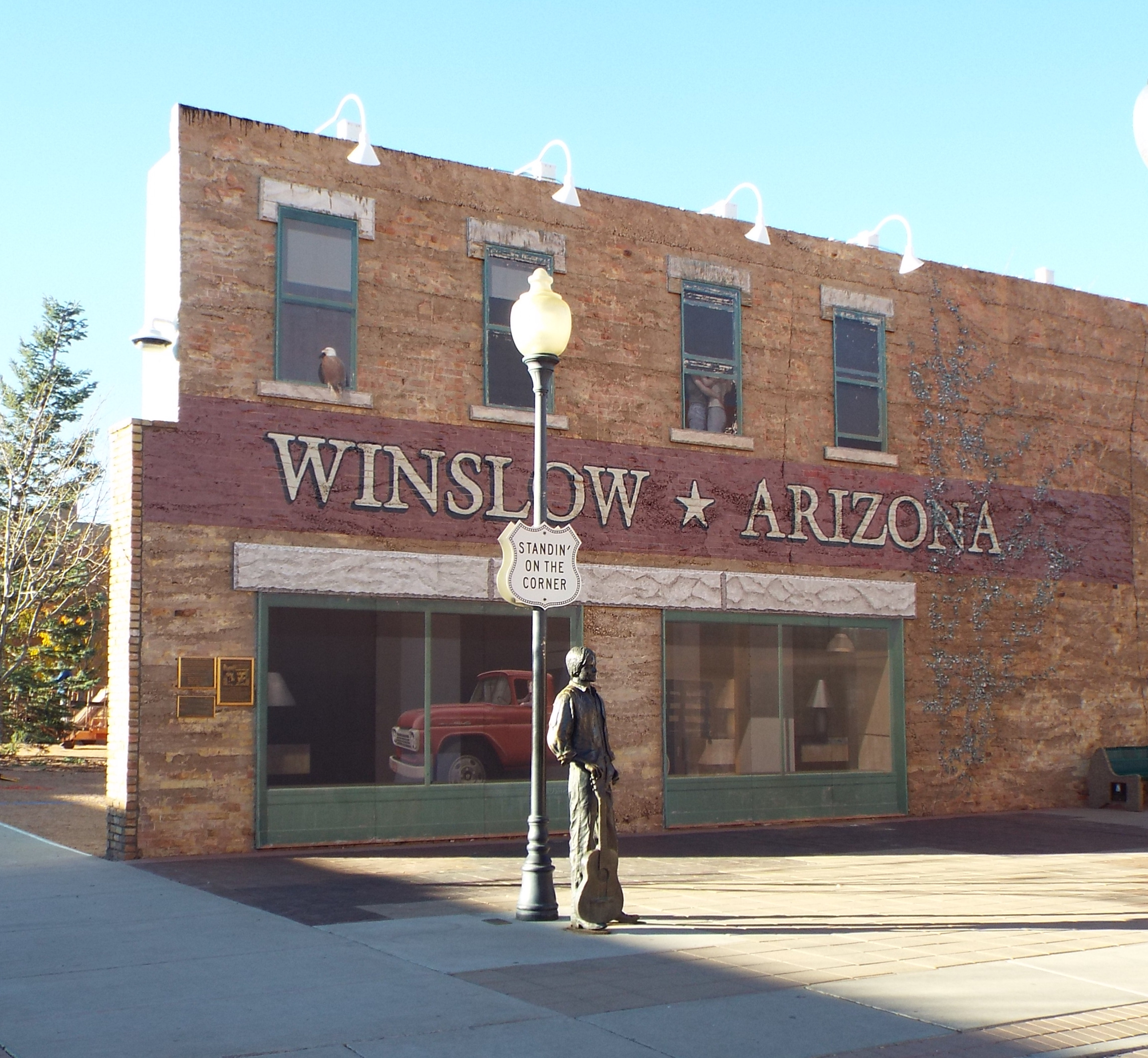
Standing on the Corner in Winslow Arizona (WHC).

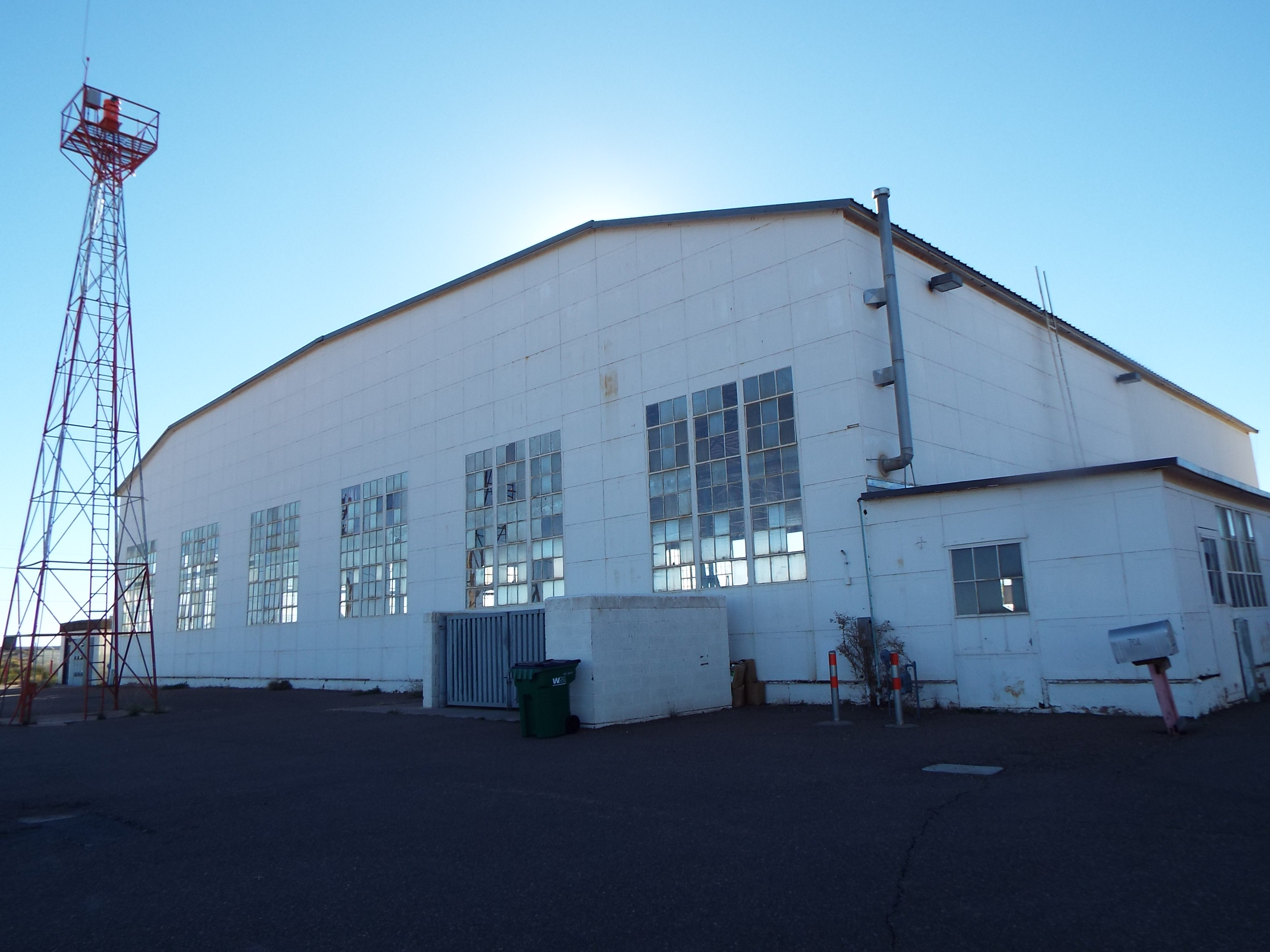
The Winslow–Lindbergh Regional Airport Hangar – 1929 (WHC).

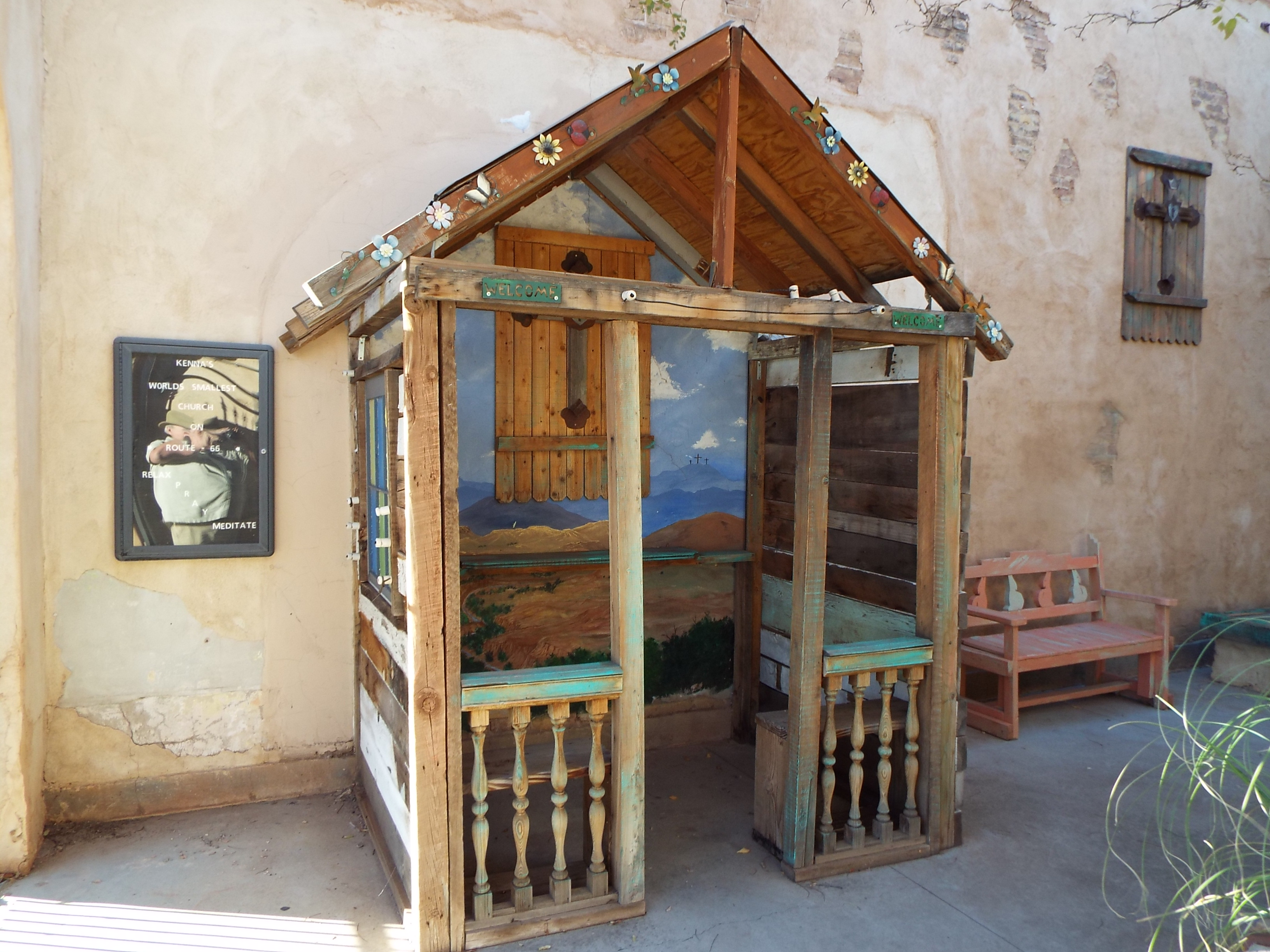
The Tiny Church of the Mother Road – 2012

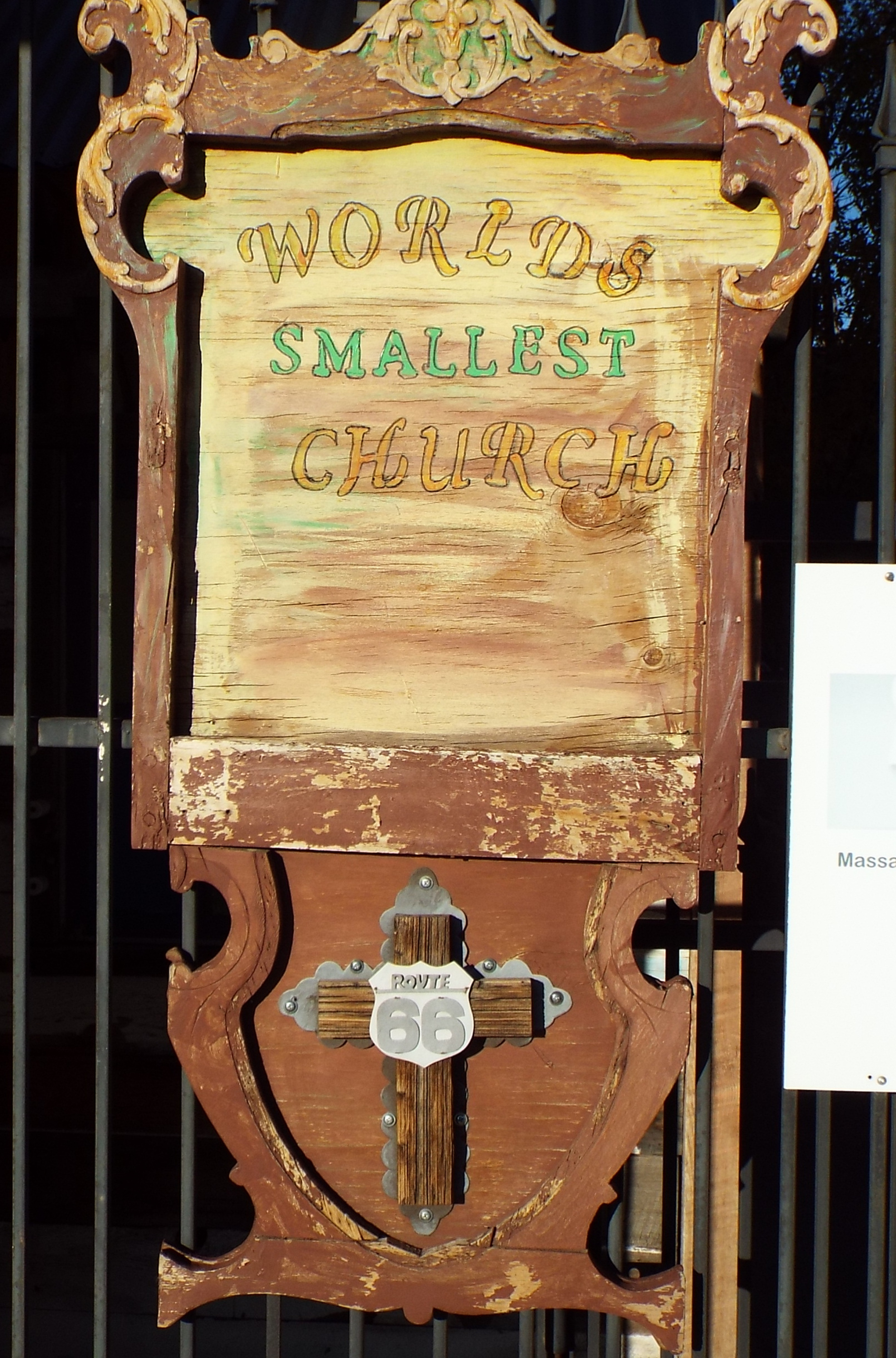
The sign claiming that the Tiny Church of the Mother Road is the world's smallest church.

== Images of historic Brigham City, Arizona ==
Pictured are some of the remaining structures of Brigham City, a Ghost town which is now located within the boundary of Winslow as they looked in 2019. Brigham City was added to the National Register of Historic Places on June 9, 1978, reference: #78000558.

Historic buildings and structures in Brigham City, in Winslow, Arizona

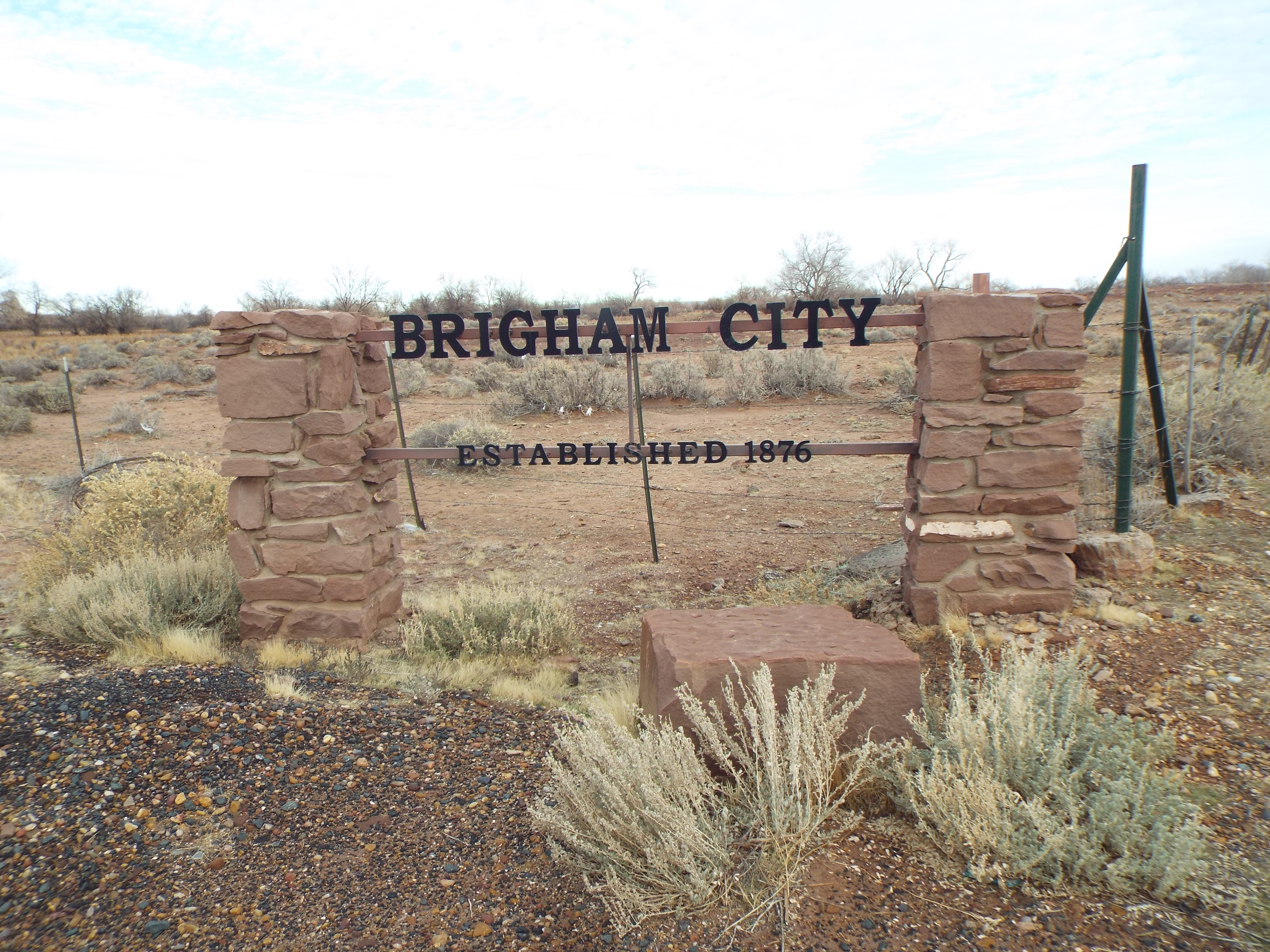
Brigham City – 1876

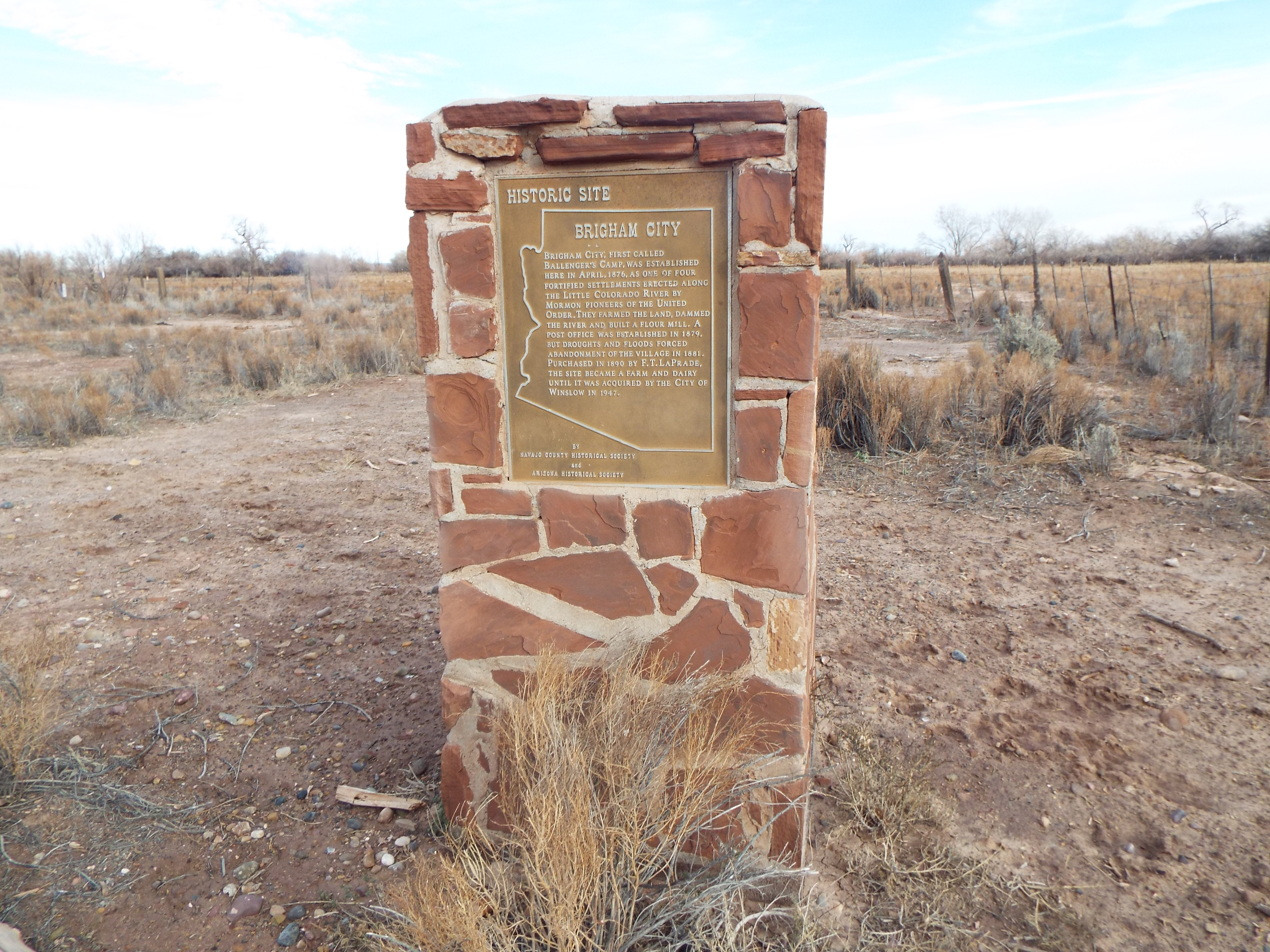

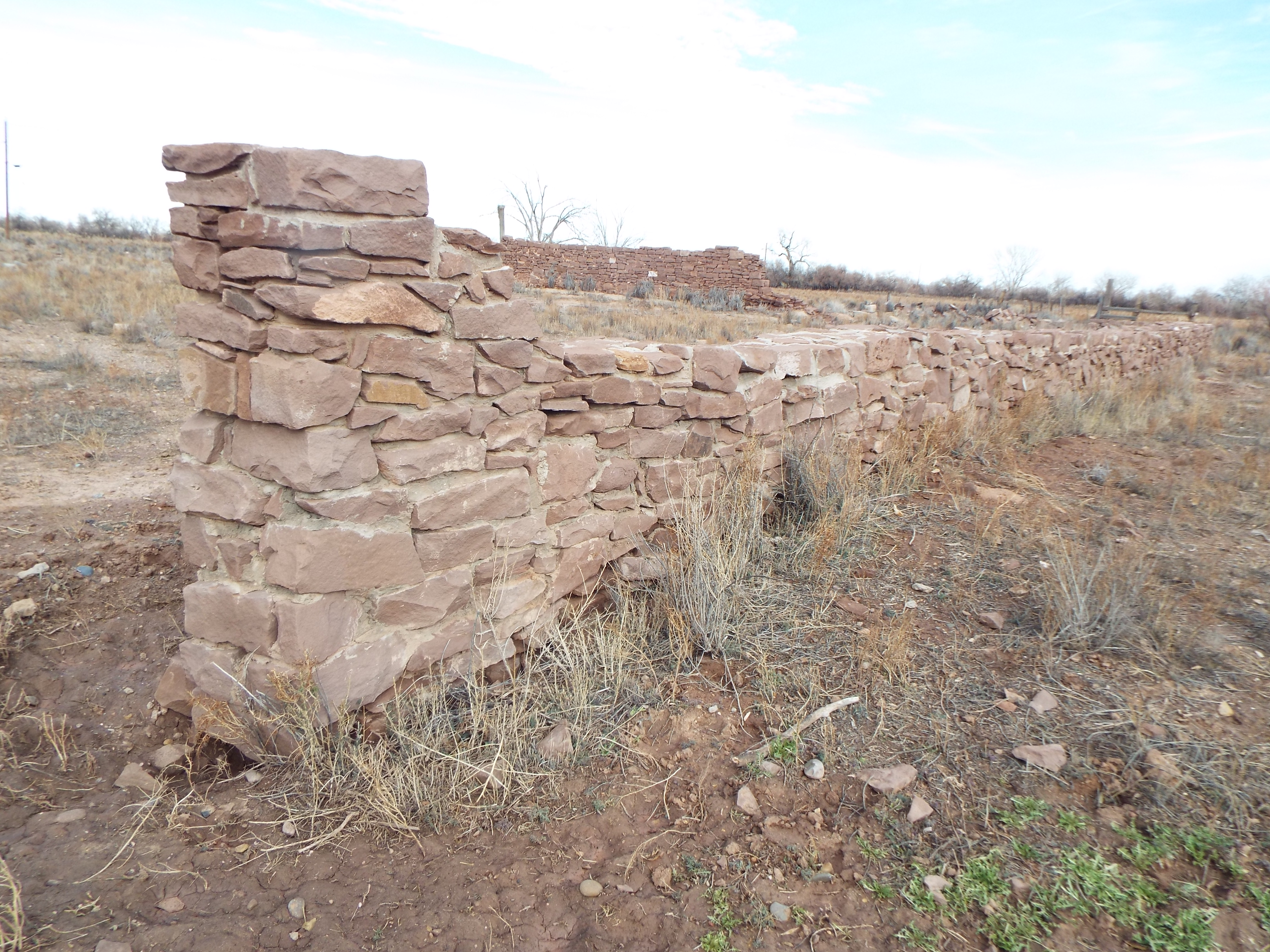

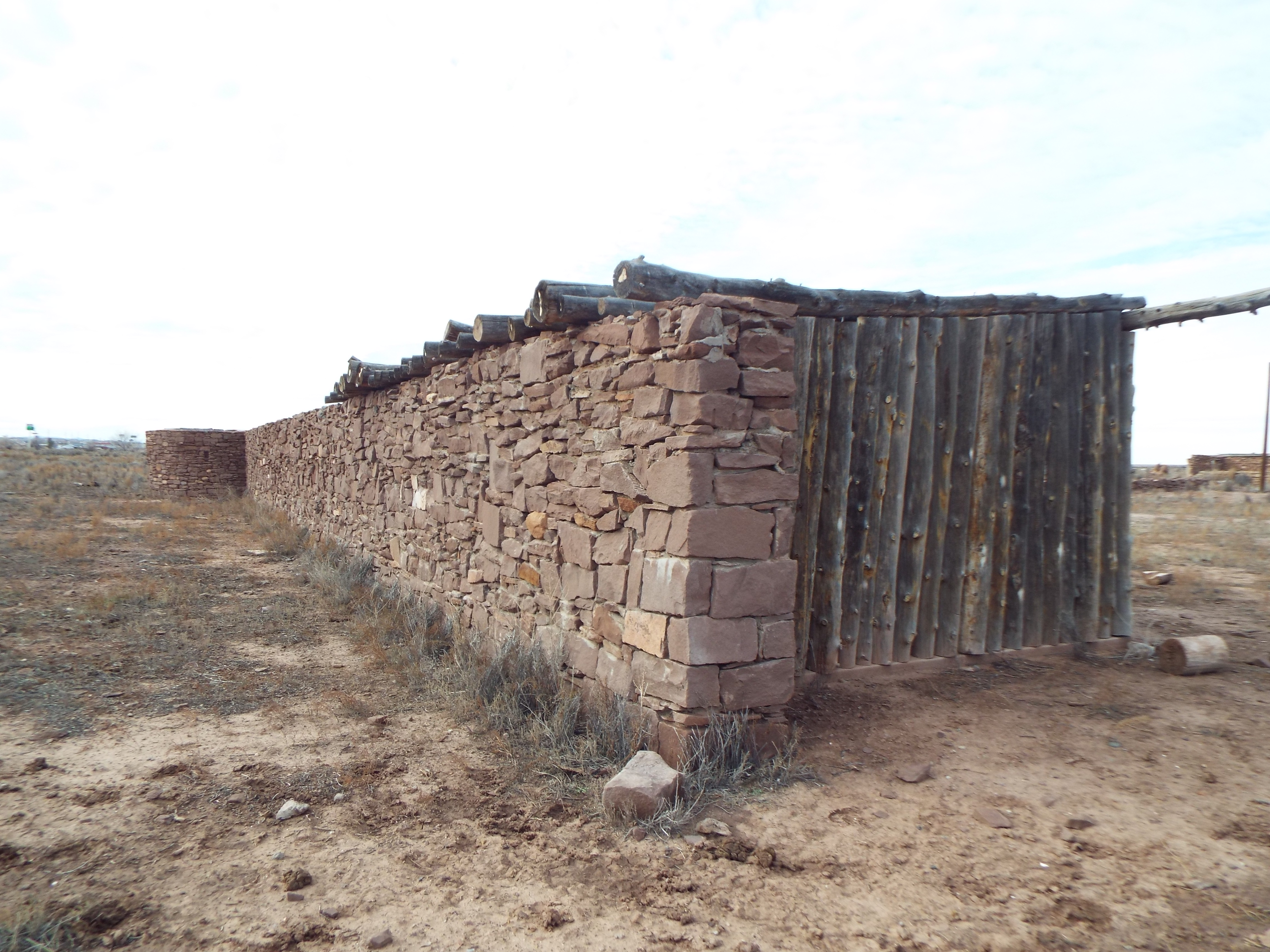

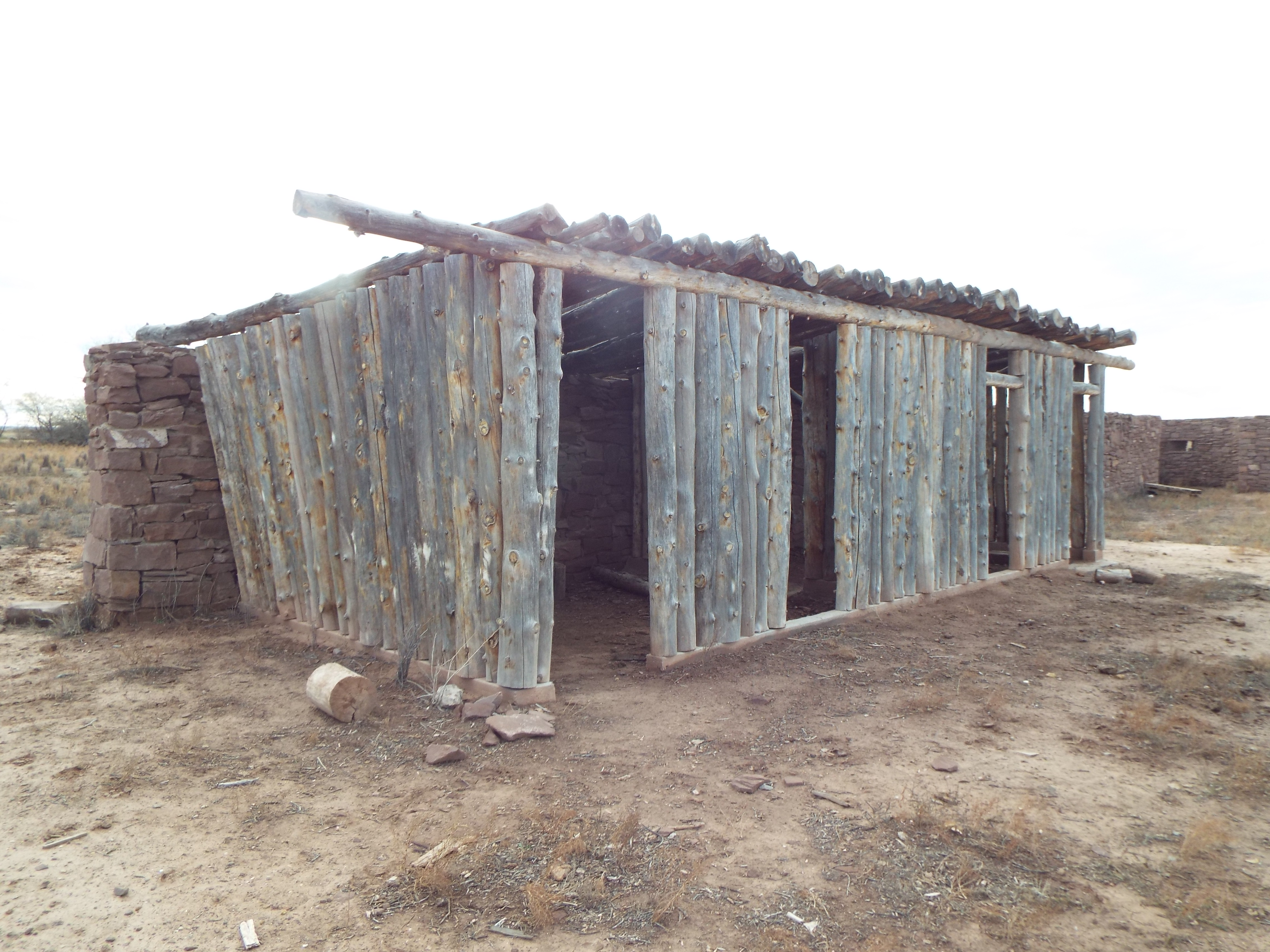

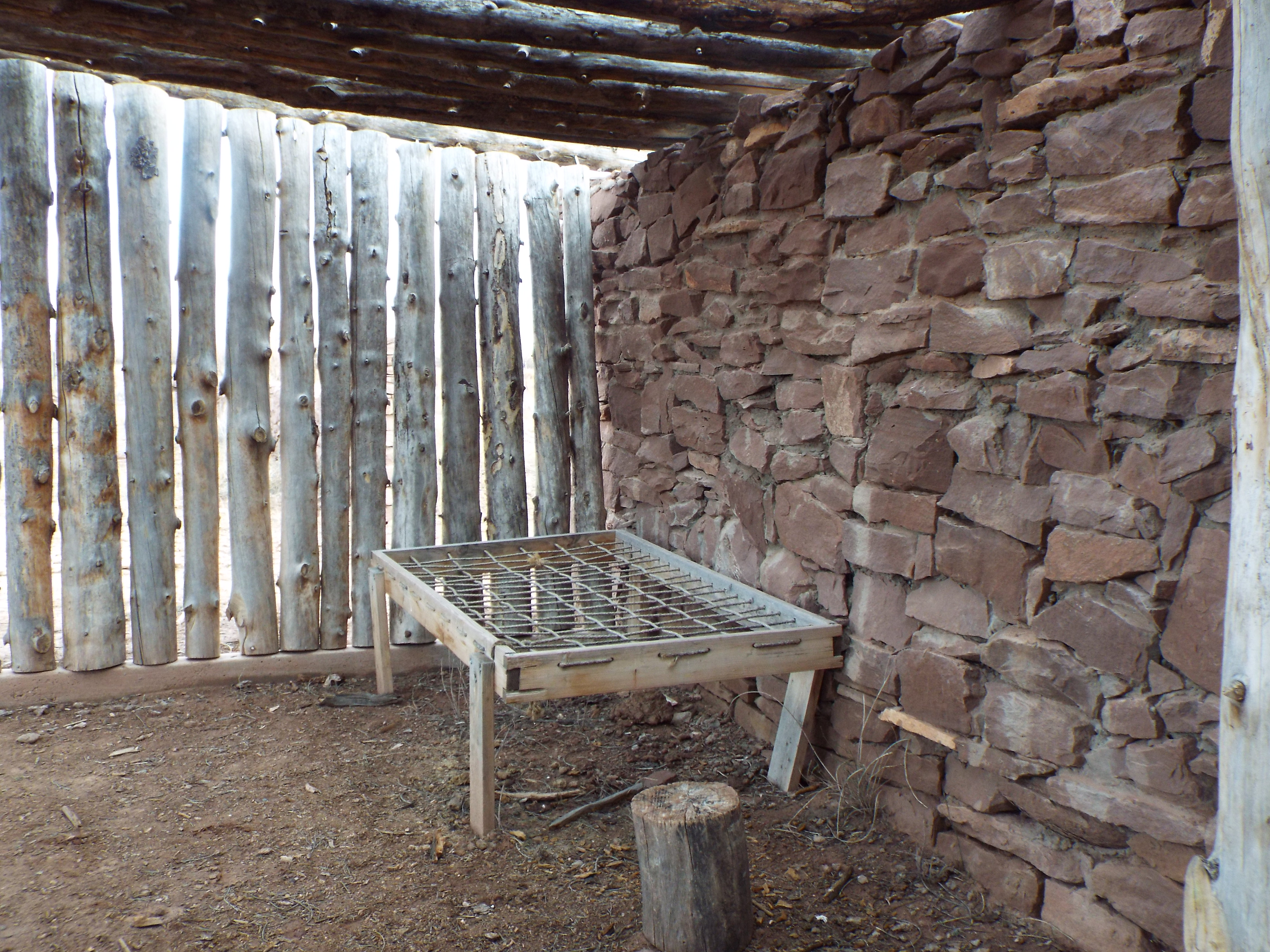

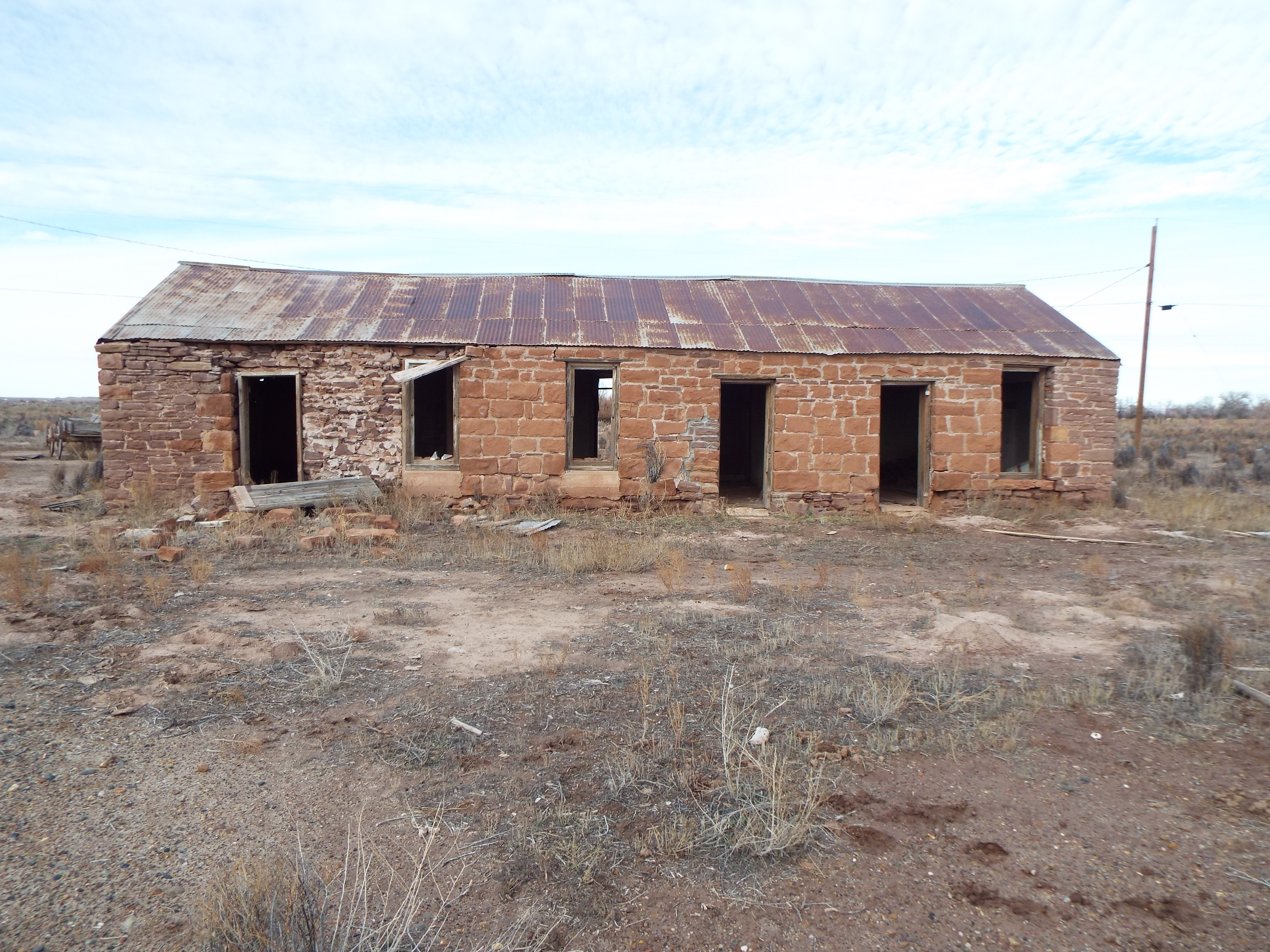

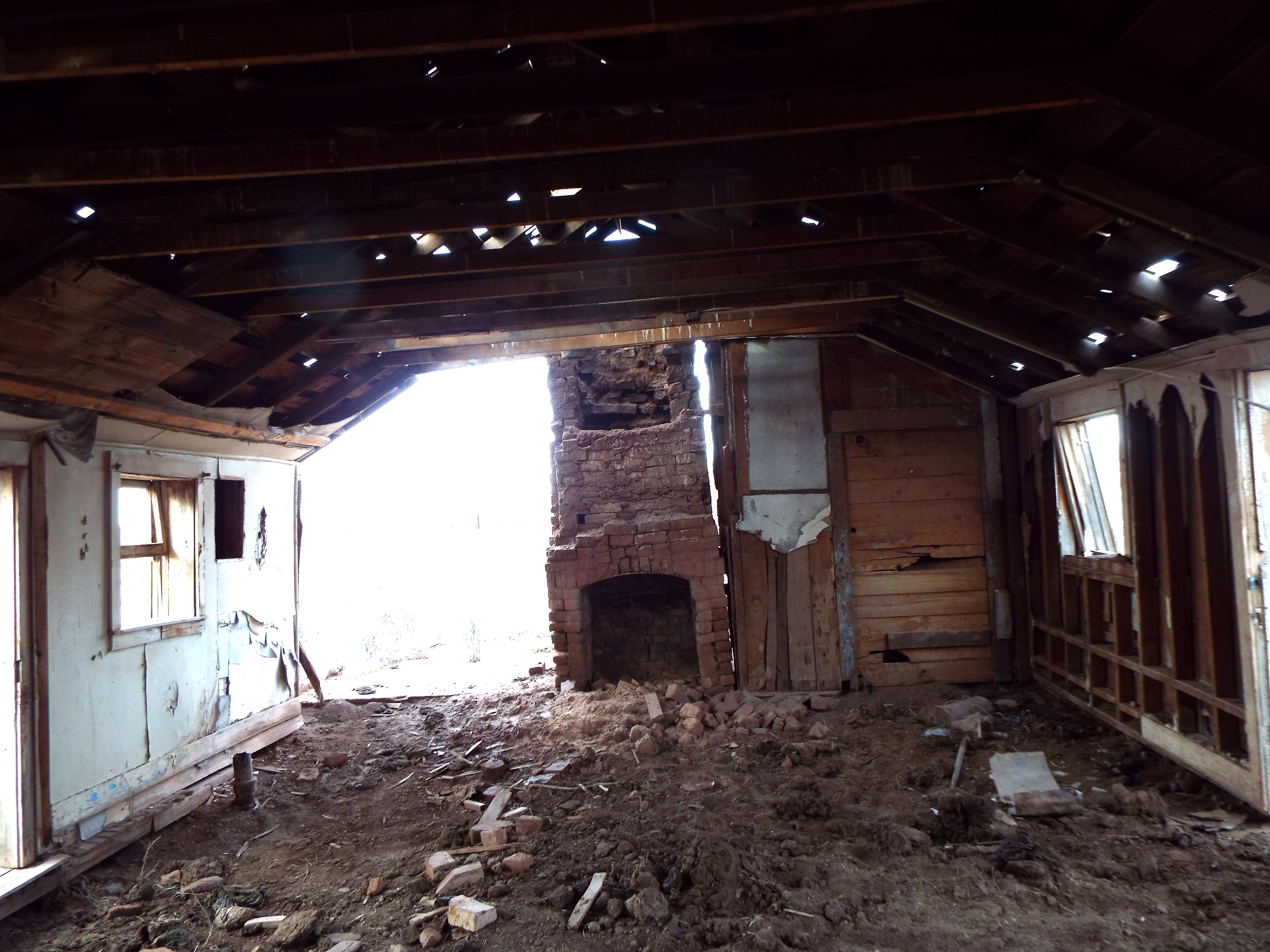

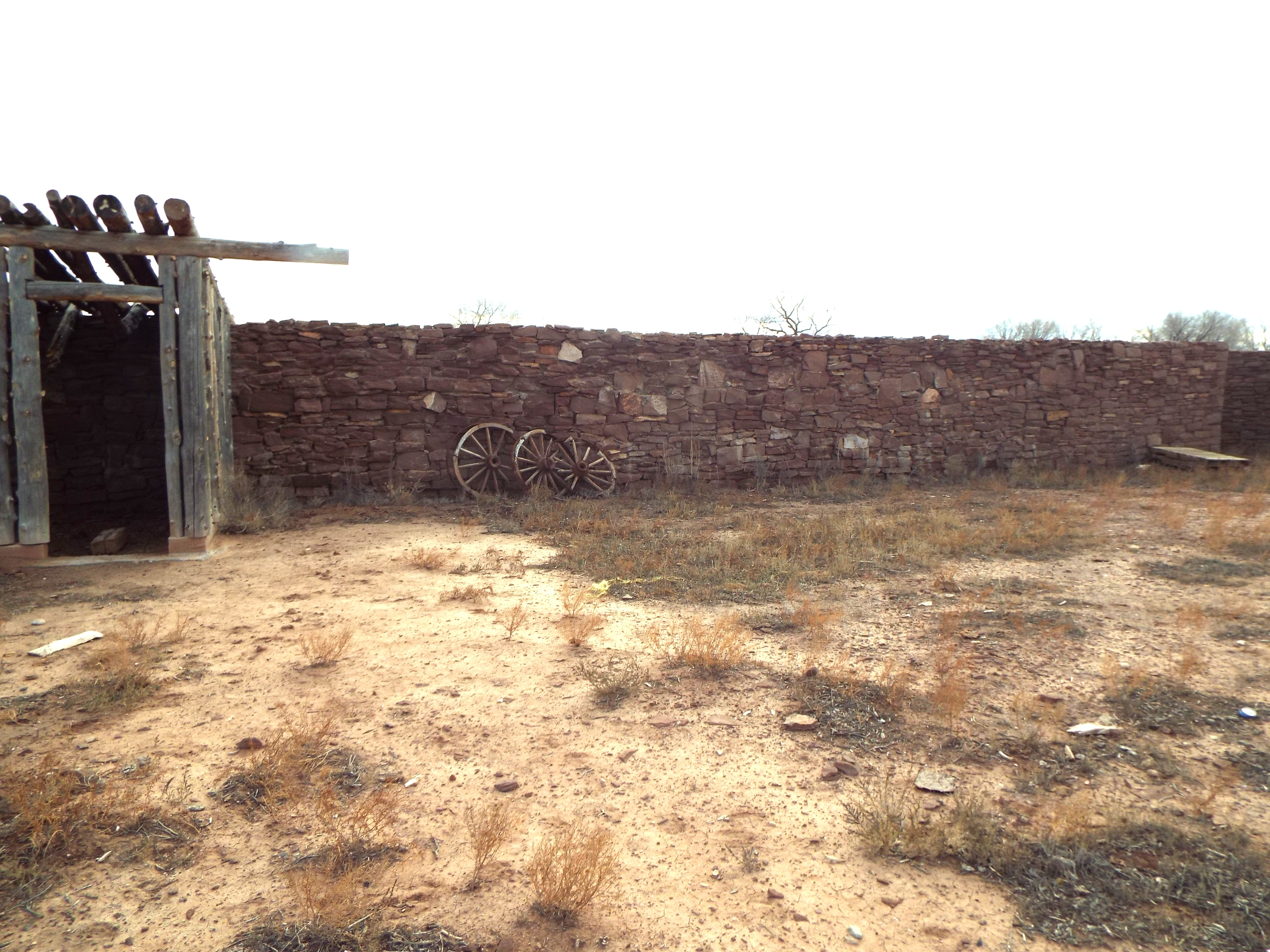

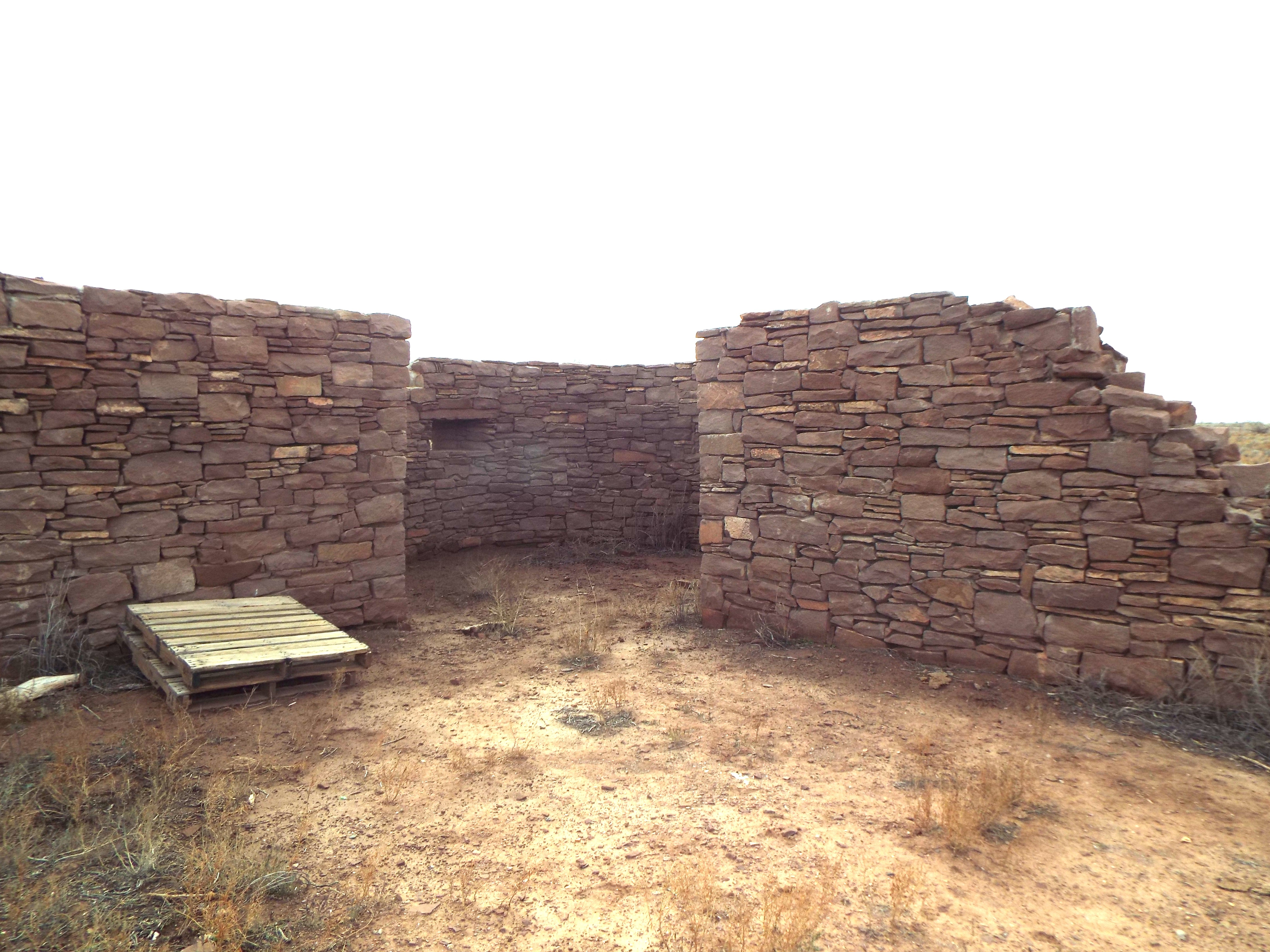

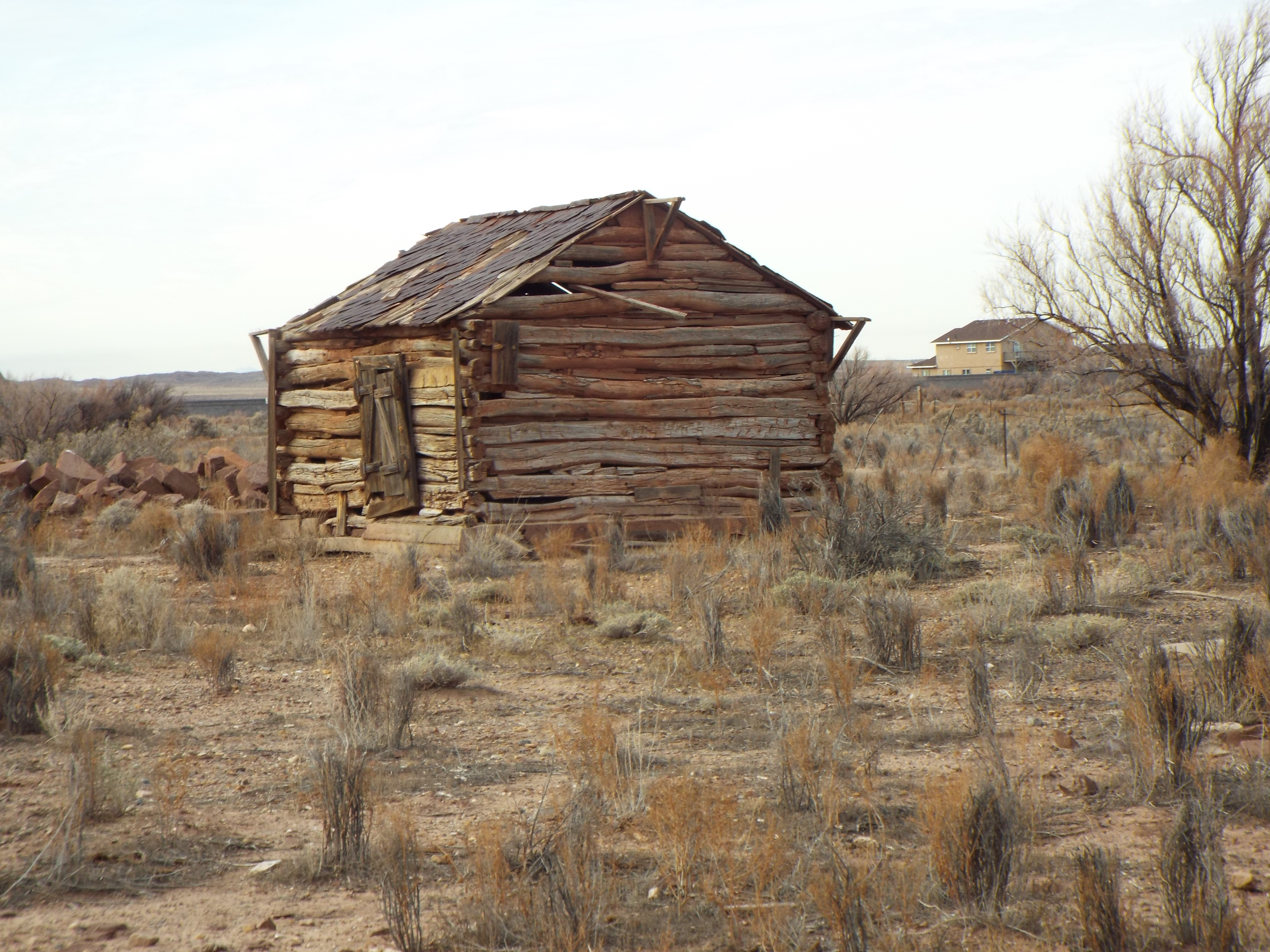

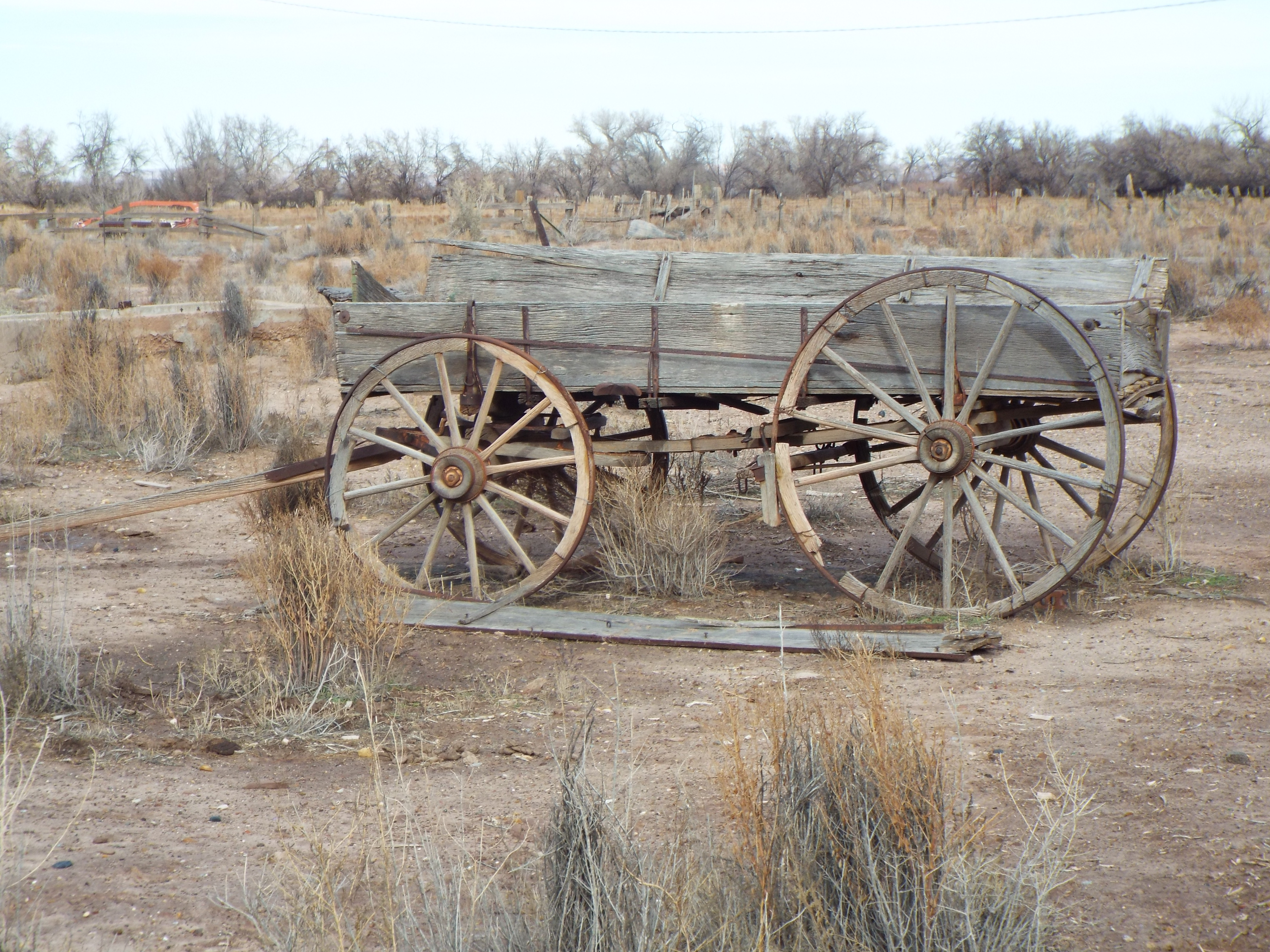

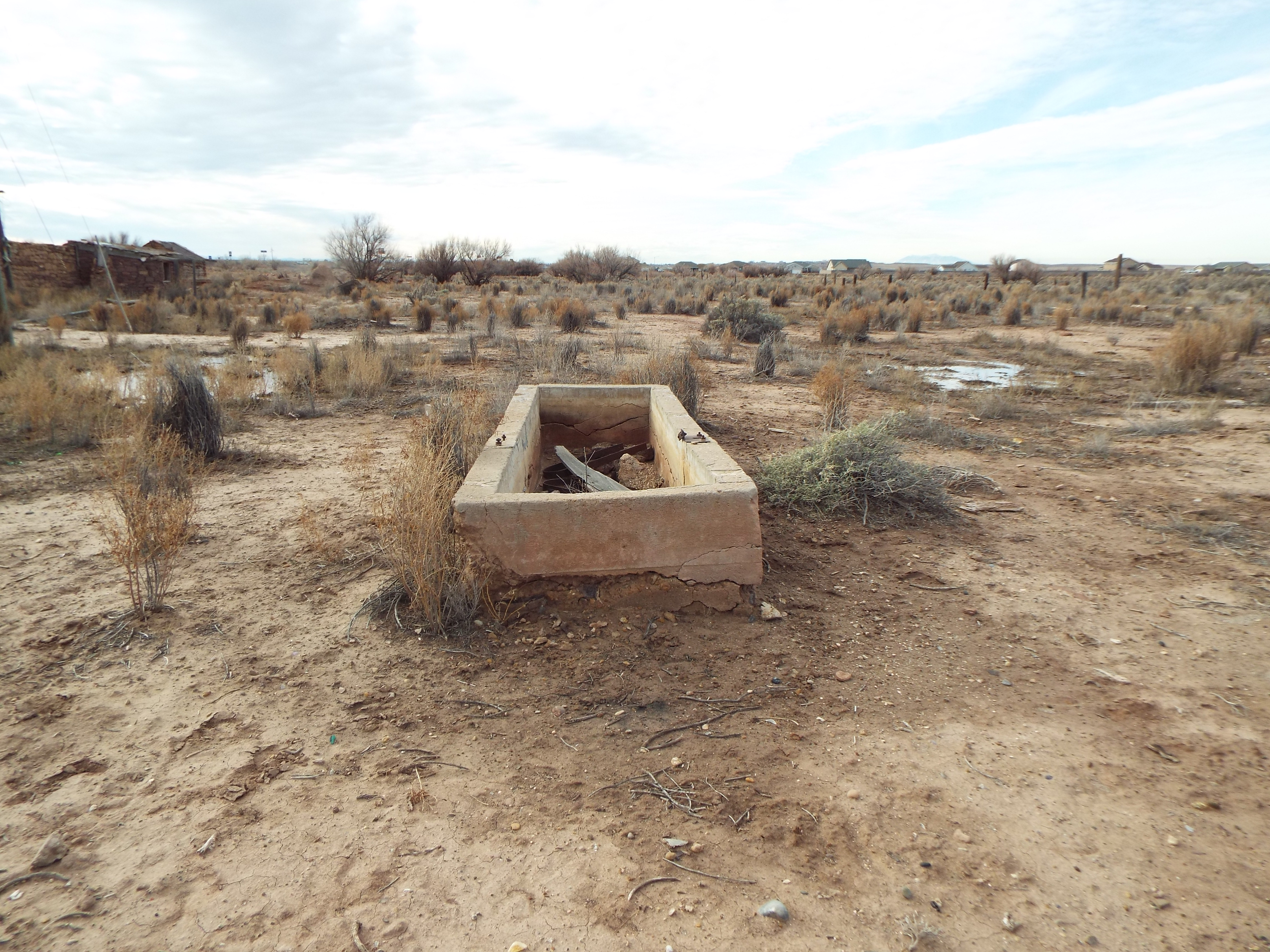

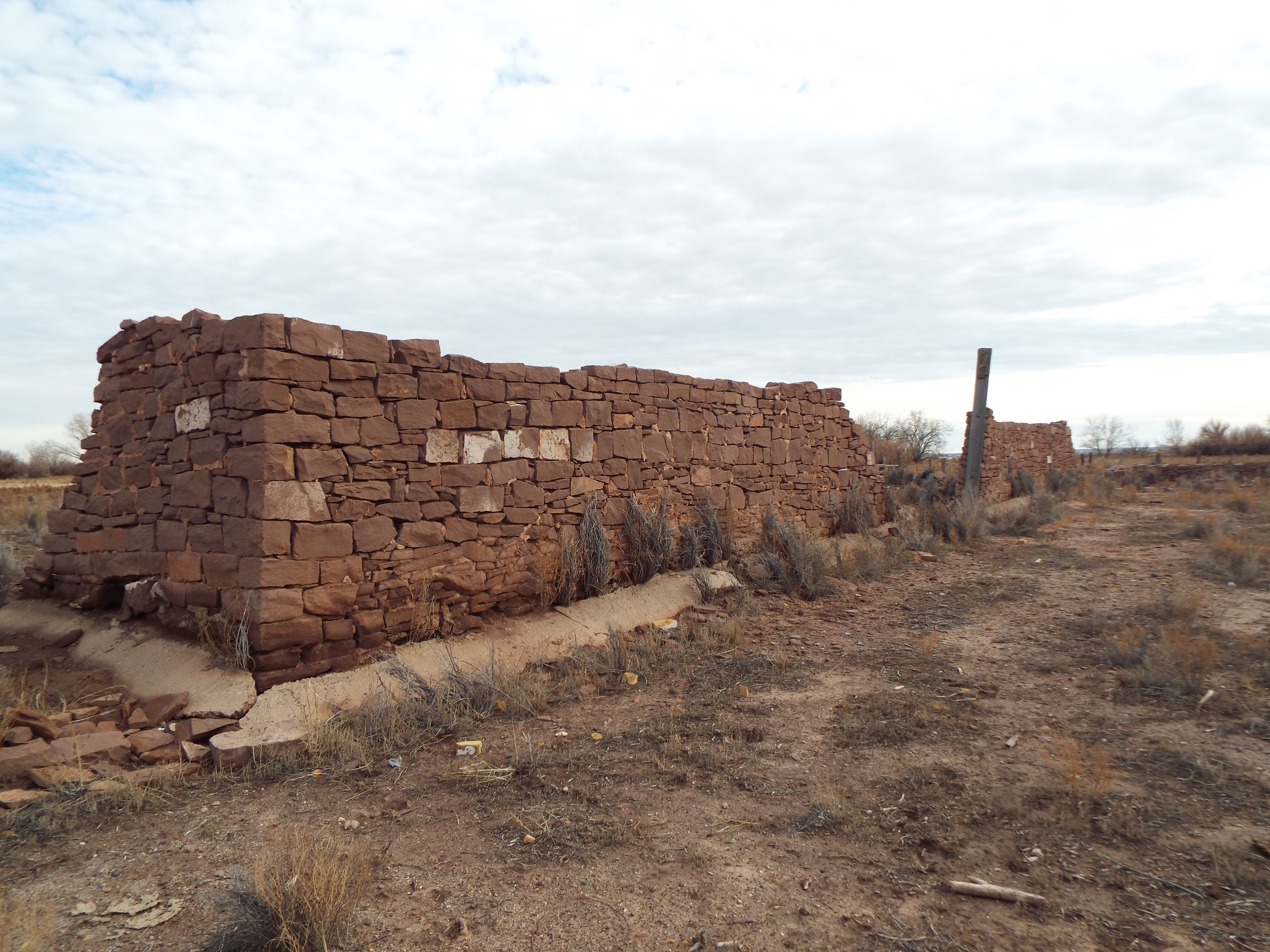

== Archaeological site ==
- The Nuvakwewtaqa Ruins. The ruins are the remains of a substantial Sinagua pueblo. The Sinagua lived in the area between A.D. 1050–1425. The site served as a trade center and was integral to ancestral Hopi migrations to the east. The site was listed in the National Register of Historic Places August 2, 1977, Ref. #75000227.

== Meteor Crater ==
The Meteor Crater was created about 50,000 years ago by a meteorite impact. Meteor Crater is nearly one mile across, 2.4 miles in circumference and more than 550 feet deep. The crater is also known as the Daniel Moreau Barringer Crater who 1909 claimed that the crater was the result of a meteorite impact. It was designated a National Natural Landmark (NNL) in November 1967. The NNL designation is made by the Secretary of the Interior after in-depth scientific study of a potential site. The crater is located on exit 233 off Interstate 40 in Winslow, Arizona.

The Holsinger Meteorite, which is the largest fragment of the meteorite that created Meteor Crater, is on exhibit at the Meteor Crater Visitor Center. Also on exhibit in the center is an Apollo Training Capsule. The American Astronaut Wall of Fame is housed in the grounds of the visitor center.

== Meteor Crater images ==
Meteor Crater

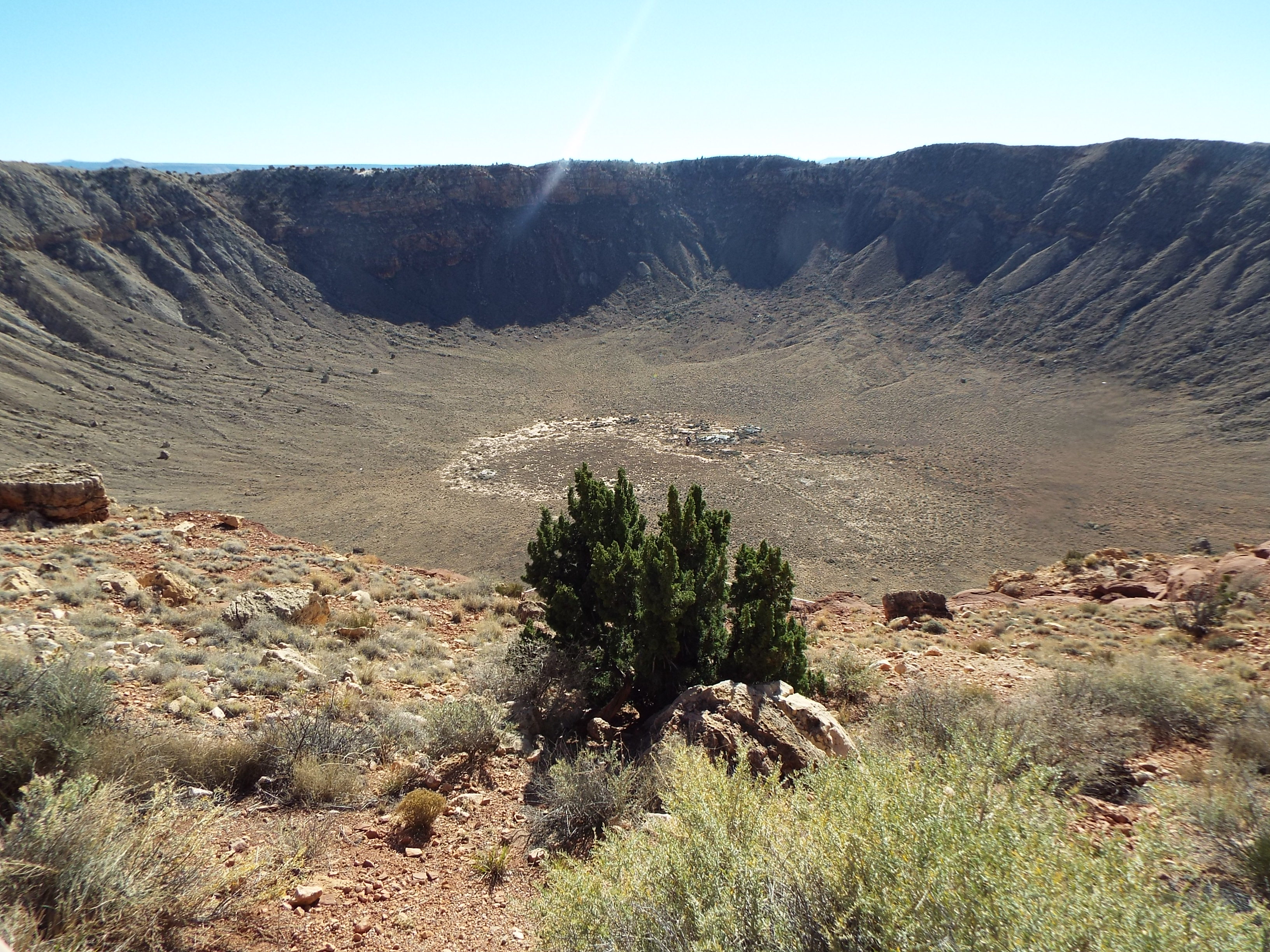
Meteor Crater

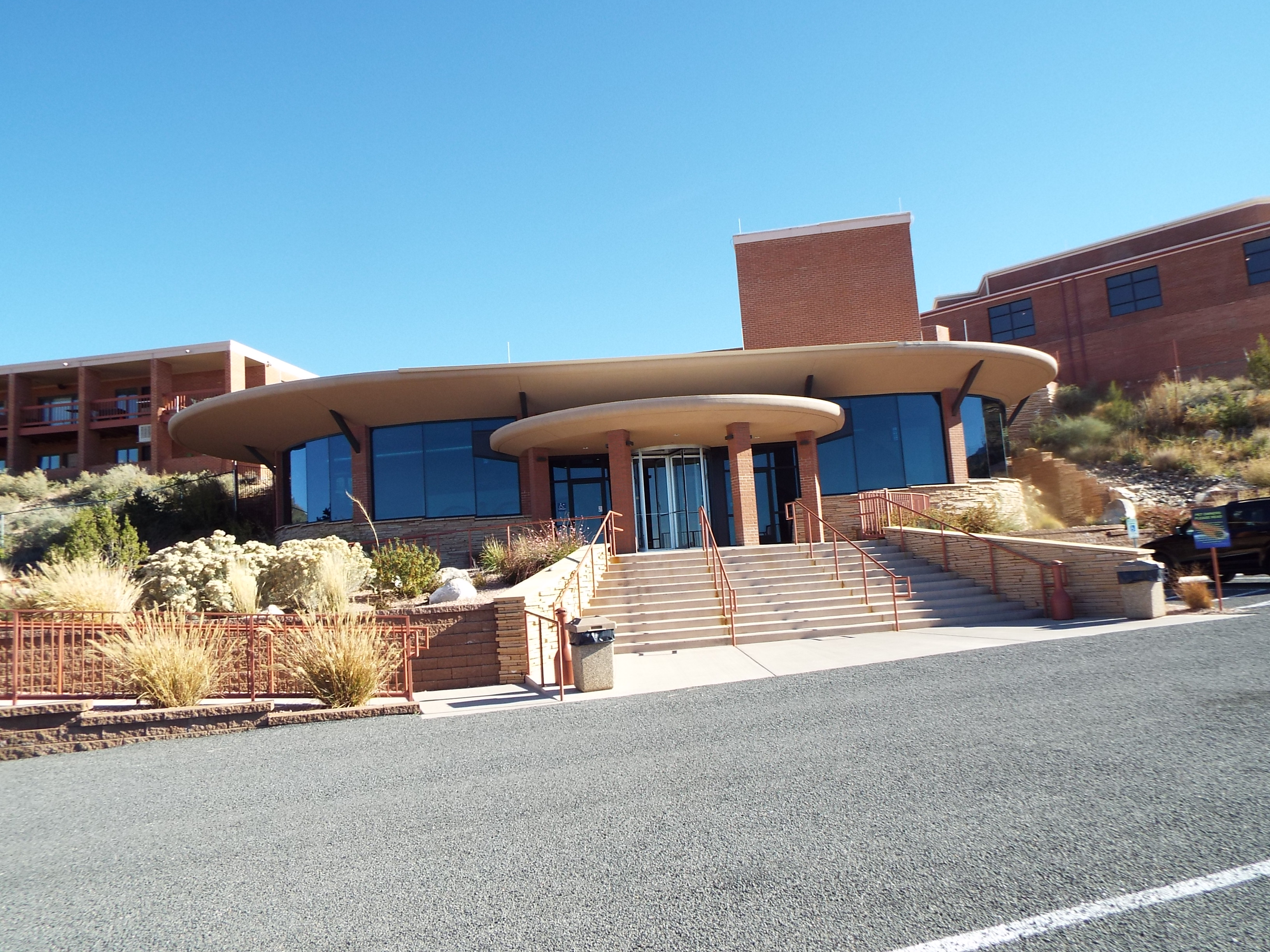
Meteor Crater Visitor Center

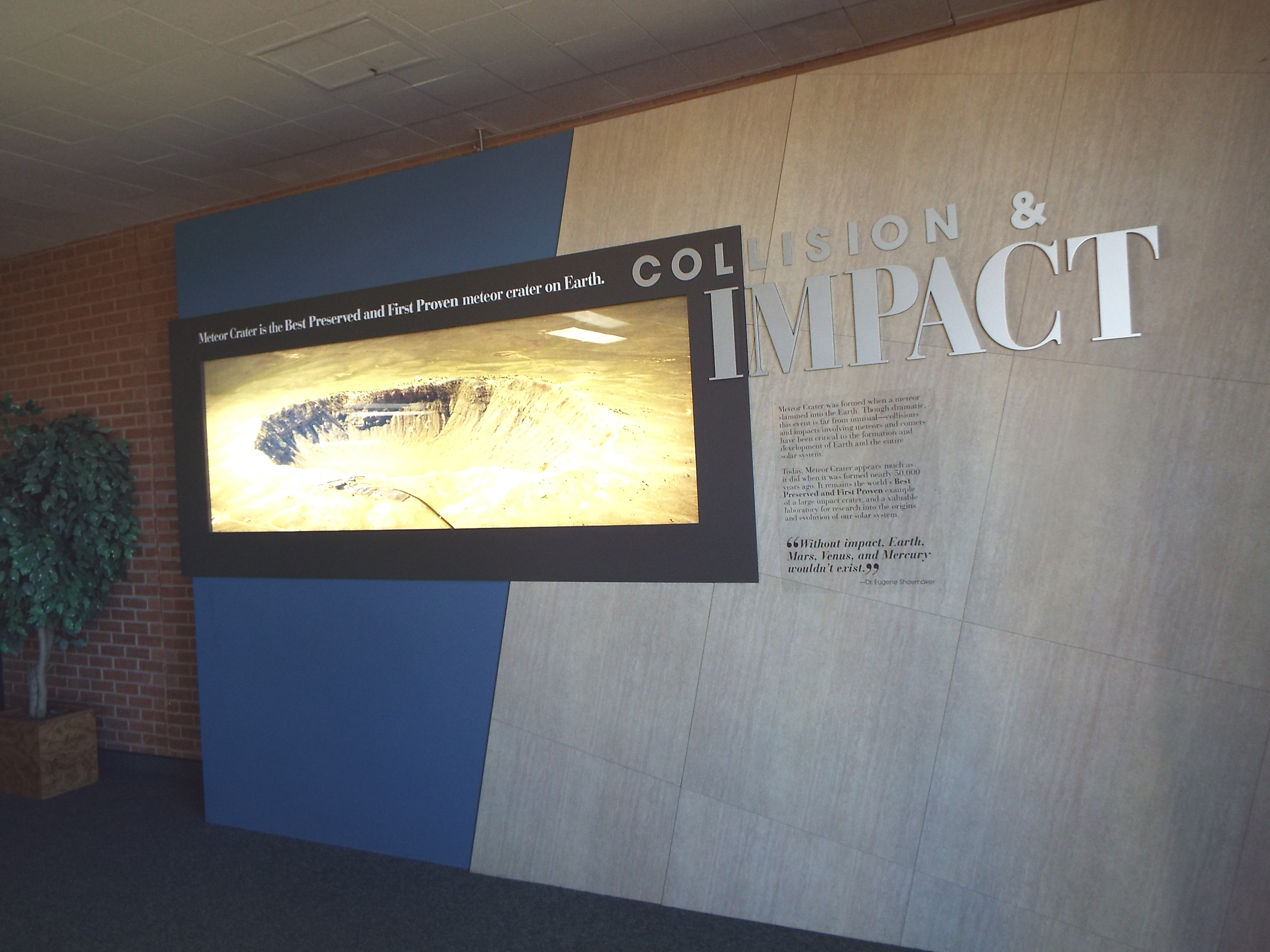
Inside the Meteor Crater Visitor Center

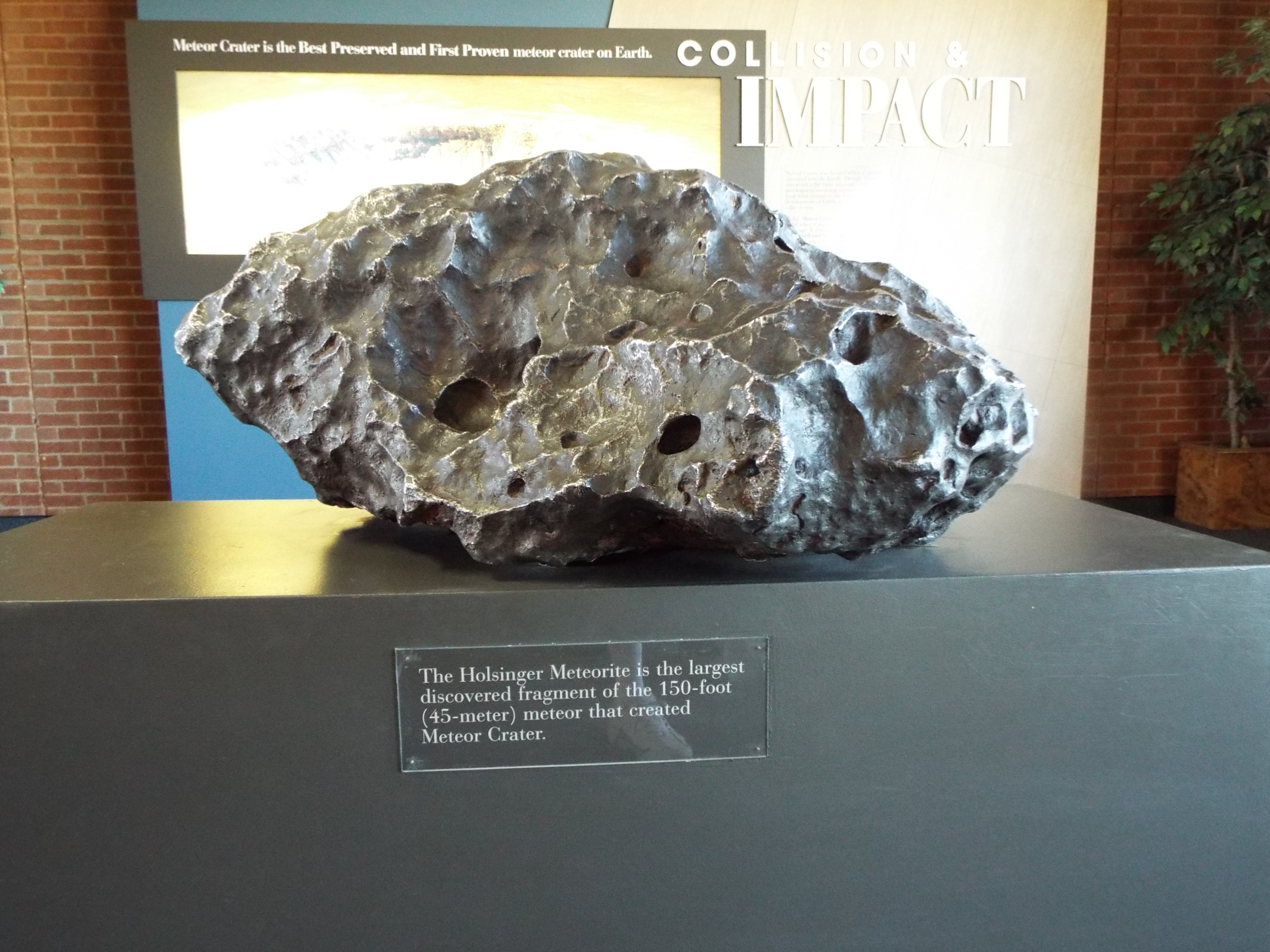
The Holsinger Meteorite

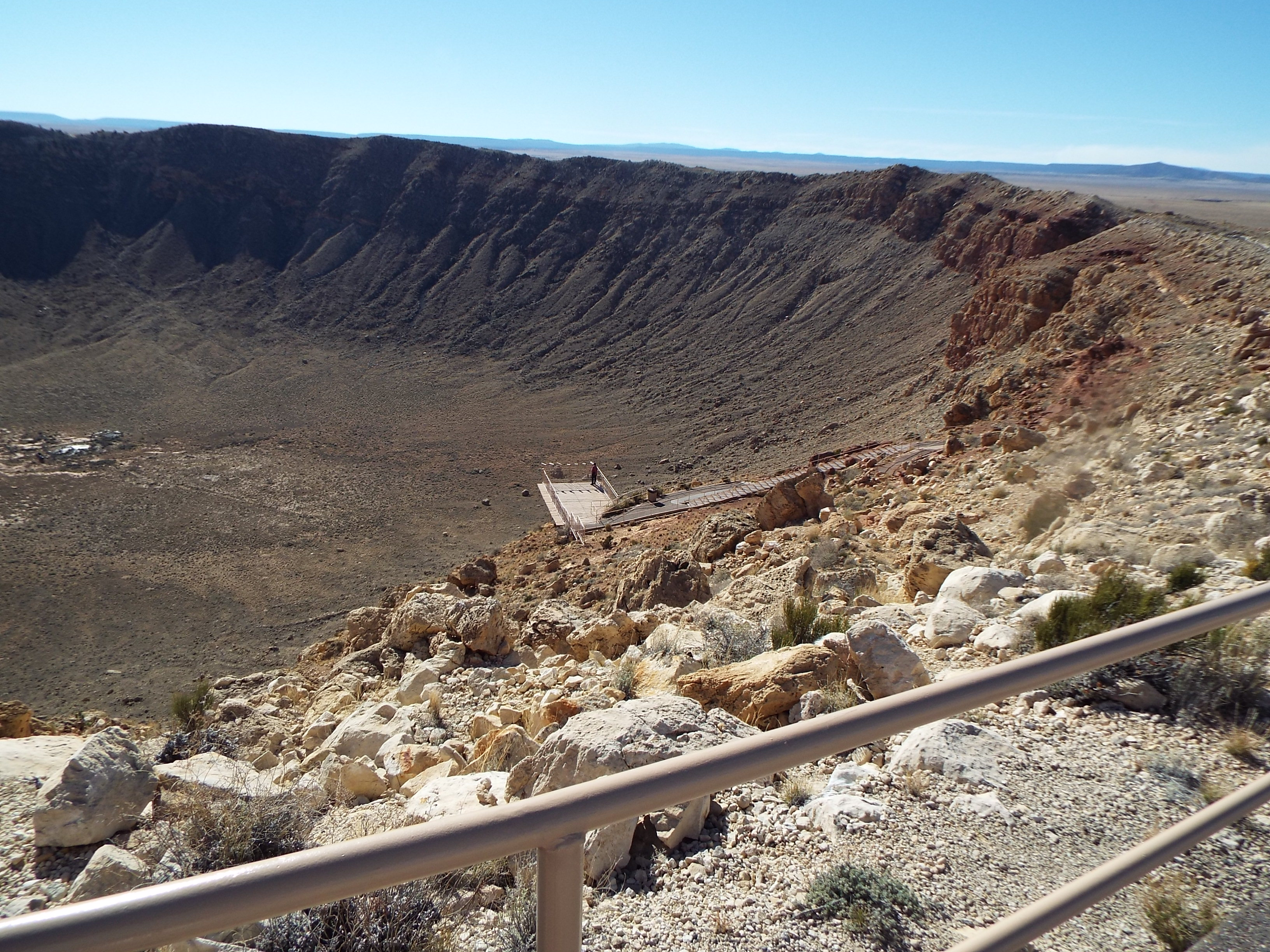
The Meteor Crater

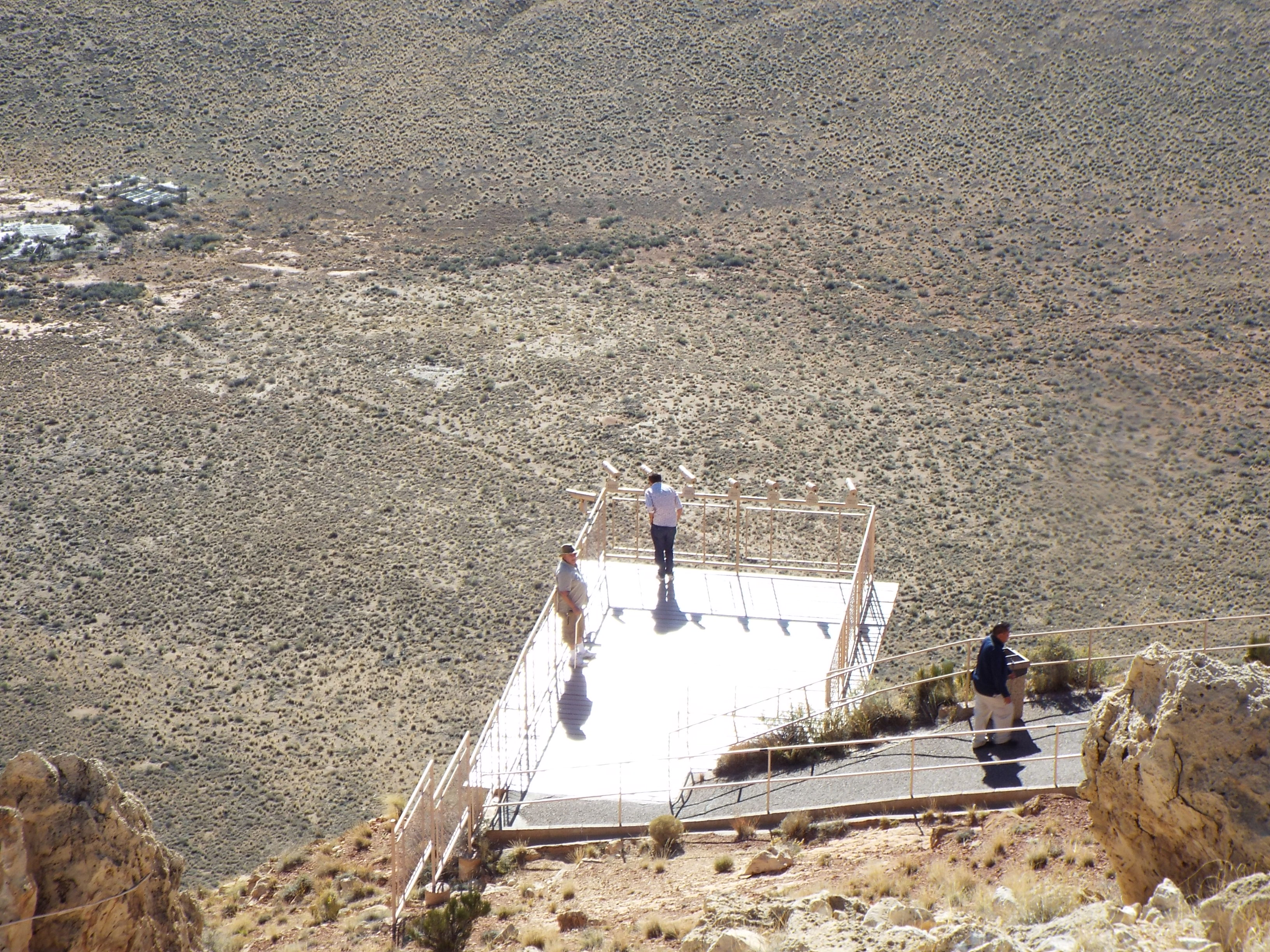
The Meteor Crater observation deck.

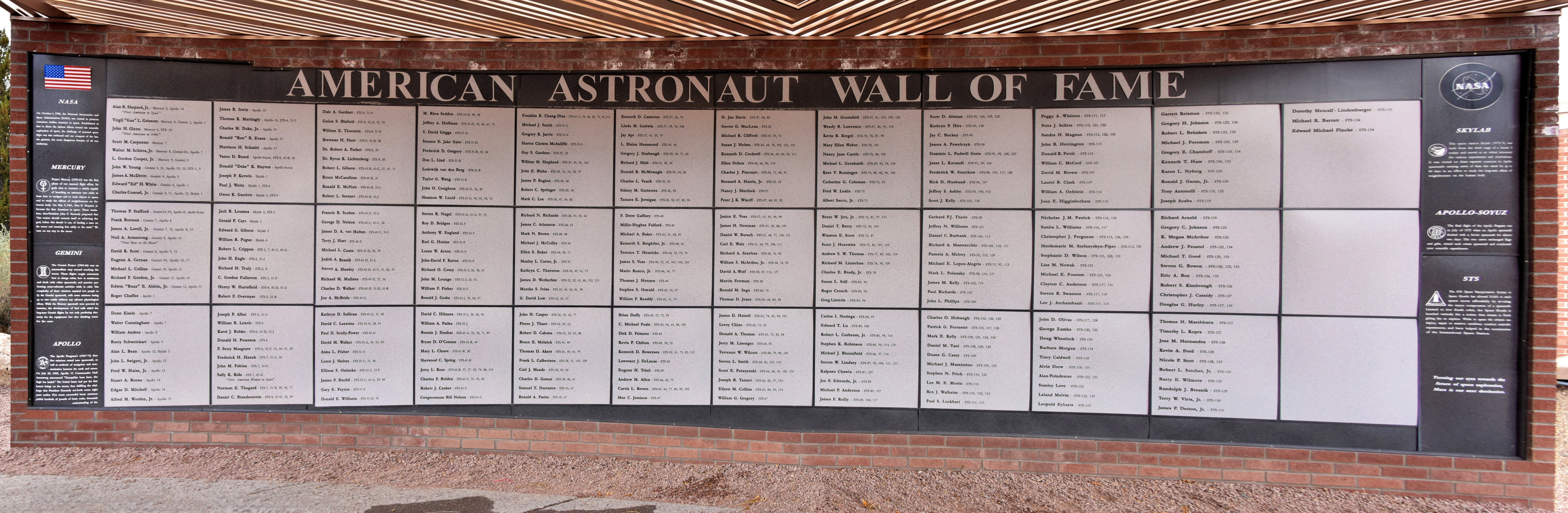
The American Astronaut Wall of Fame

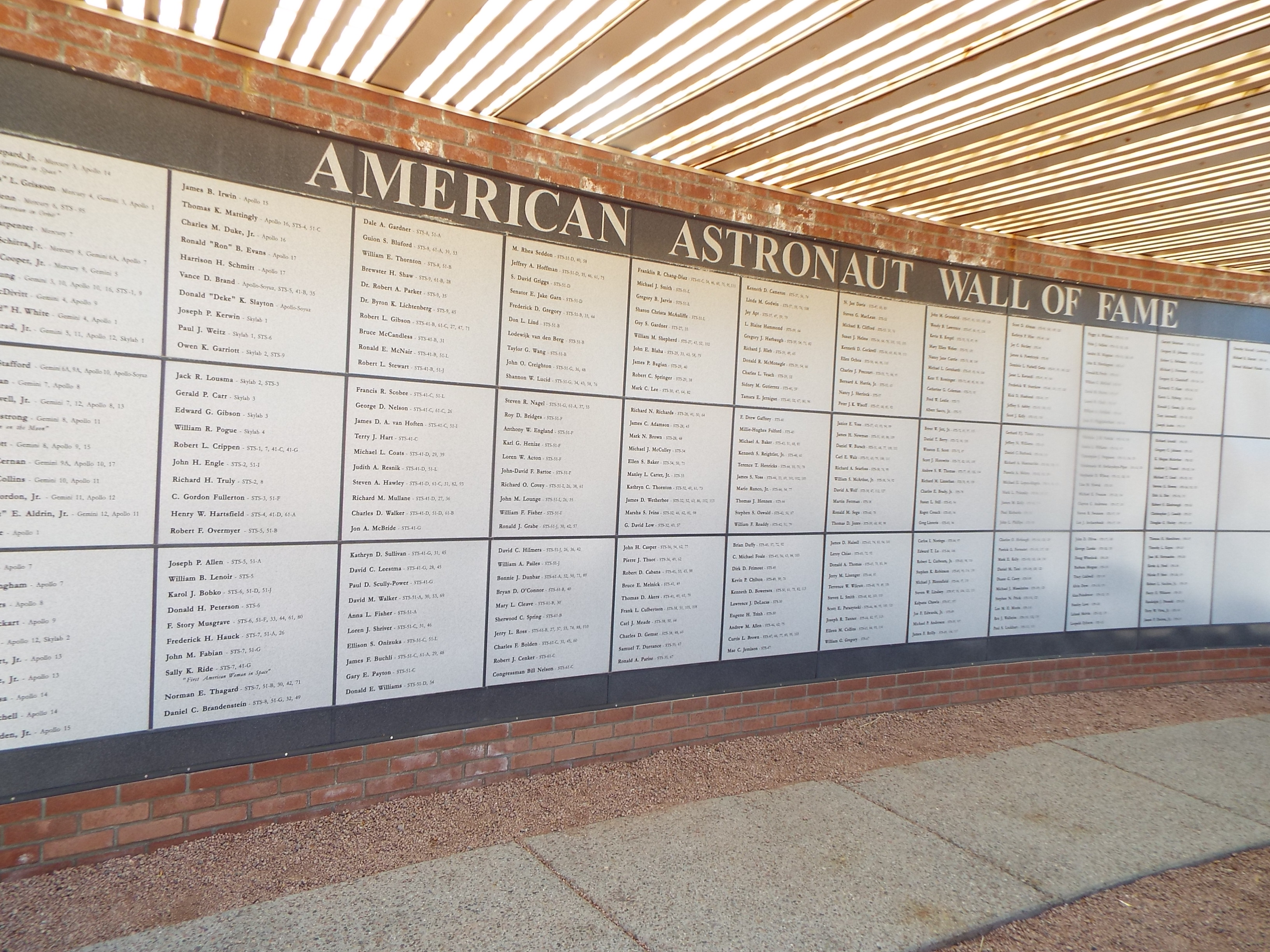
The American Astronaut Wall of Fame

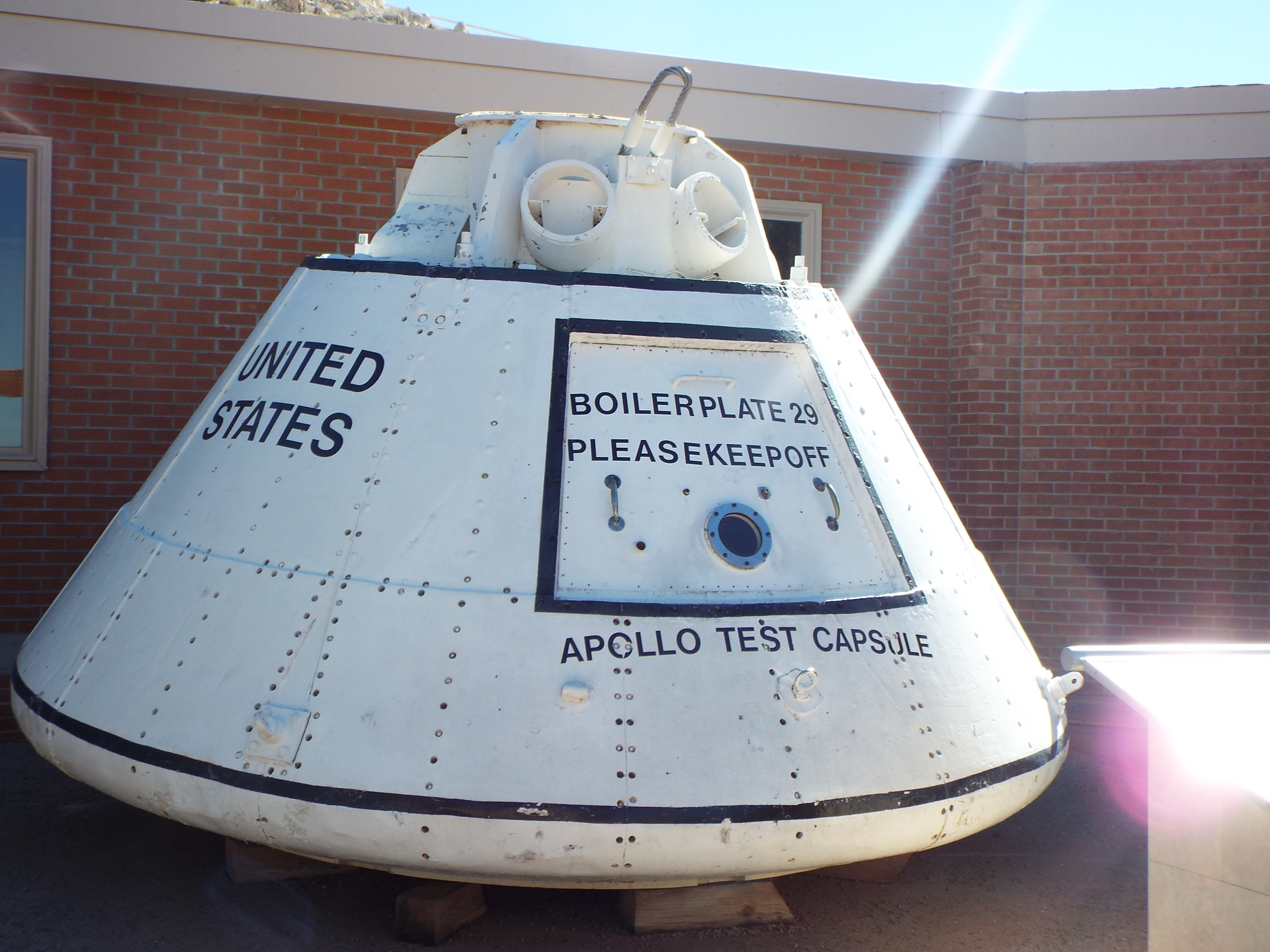
An Apollo Test Capsule.

== See also ==
- Winslow, Arizona
- National Register of Historic Places listings in Navajo County, Arizona
