= Harvey Girls =

Harvey Girls may refer to:

- Harvey Girls, employees of the Fred Harvey Company who worked in the "Harvey House" lunch rooms, restaurants, souvenir shops, and hotels
- The Harvey Girls, a 1946 MGM musical by George Sidney
- The Harvey Girls (novel), a 1942 novel by Samuel Hopkins Adams
- The protagonists of the television series Harvey Street Kids (also known as Harvey Girls Forever!)
