= Fred Harvey (entrepreneur) =

American businessman

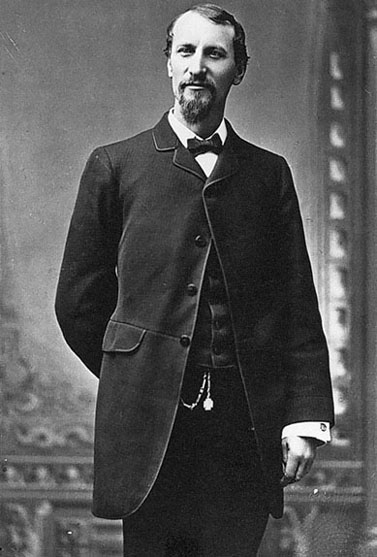
- Born: Frederick Henry Harvey; June 27, 1835; London, England, United Kingdom
- Died: February 9, 1901 (aged 65); Leavenworth, Leavenworth County, Kansas, US

Frederick Henry Harvey (June 27, 1835 – February 9, 1901) was an entrepreneur who developed the Harvey House lunch rooms, restaurants, souvenir shops, and hotels, which served rail passengers on the Atchison, Topeka and Santa Fe Railway, the Gulf Colorado and Santa Fe Railway, the Kansas Pacific Railway, the St. Louis-San Francisco Railway, and the Terminal Railroad Association of St. Louis.

As an innovative restaurateur and marketer, Fred Harvey is credited with creating the first restaurant chain in the United States. He was also a leader in promoting tourism in the American Southwest in the late 19th century. Fred Harvey and his employees successfully brought new higher standards of both civility and dining to a region widely regarded in the era as "the Wild West." He created a legacy which was continued by his sons and remained in the family until the death of a grandson in 1965.

Despite the decline of passenger train patronage in the United States in the 20th century with the advent of the automobile, portions of the Fred Harvey Company have continued to operate since 1968 as part of a larger hospitality industry conglomerate.

== Early life ==
Frederick Henry Harvey was born to mixed Scottish and English parents, and immigrated into the United States from Liverpool, England, in 1853 at the age of 17. He took a job in New York City as a pot scrubber and busboy at Smith and McNell's restaurant, a popular New York city restaurant. There he learned the business from the establishment's quirky proprietors, Henry Smith and T. R. McNell. They taught him the importance of quality service, fresh ingredients and the handshake deal. Harvey quickly worked his way up to busboy, waiter and line cook.

This early entry into the world of food service would have large impacts later in his life. He moved from New York to New Orleans after 18 months, where he survived a bout with yellow fever, and then to St. Louis where he worked in a jewelry store. In 1856 he married Barbara Sarah Mattas, with whom he would have six children.

== Railroad employment ==
Despite successful employment, Harvey felt compelled to return to the food industry. He started a Café with a partner, and the two ran a profitable business. However, the Civil War soon interfered. The partner was sympathetic to the Confederacy and left town, taking all of the money the two had earned. Harvey soon got back on his feet, working for the Hannibal and St. Joseph Railroad which was eventually purchased by the Chicago, Burlington and Quincy Railroad. He ascended the corporate ladder and was transferred to Leavenworth, Kansas, which would remain his home. Harvey traveled frequently while working for the railroads and found himself deeply dissatisfied with the food served to travelers.

== Entrepreneurship ==
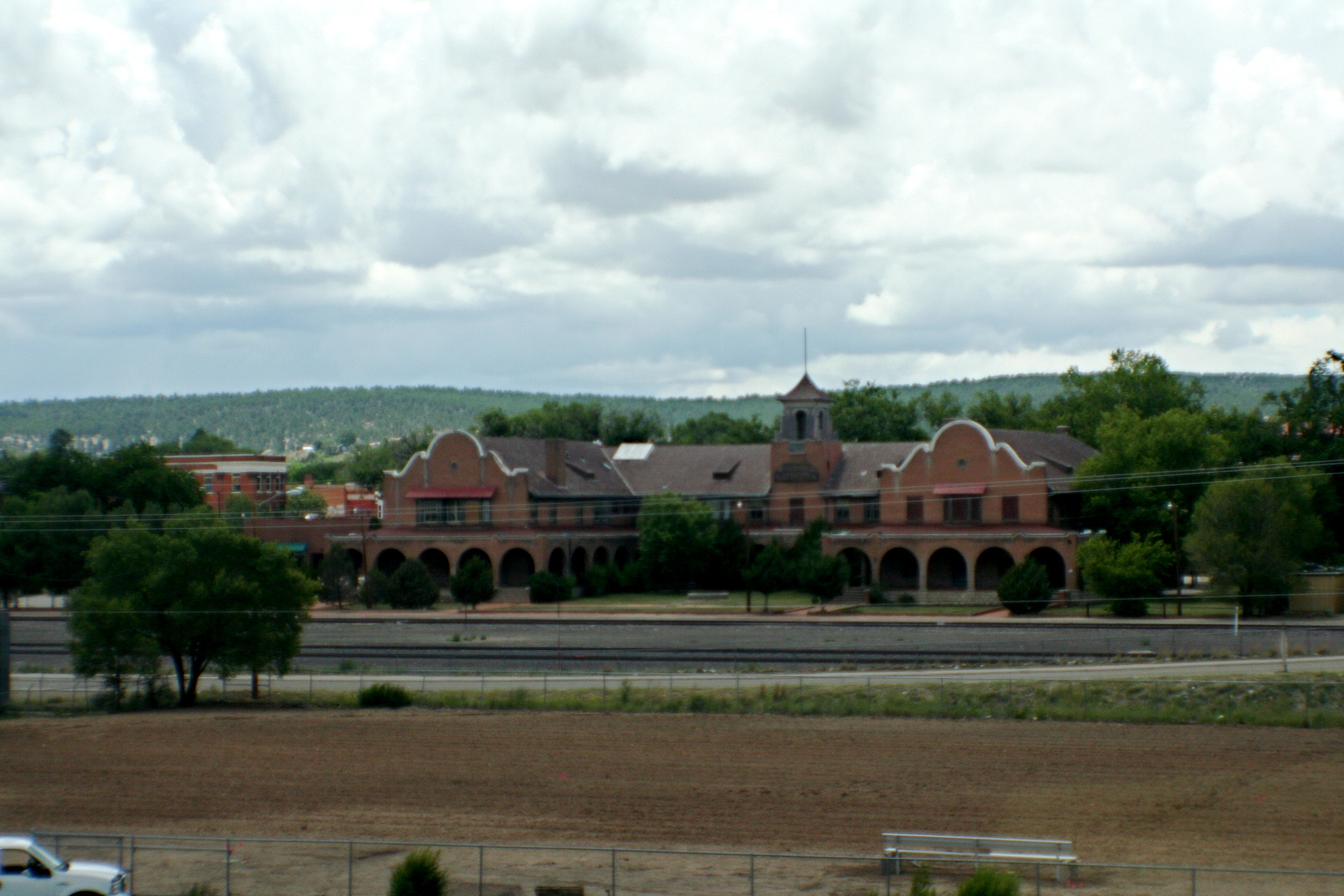
La Casteňada, Las Vegas, NM as seen in 2010. An early mission revival style Harvey House (1899) near the Santa Fe Railway train depot

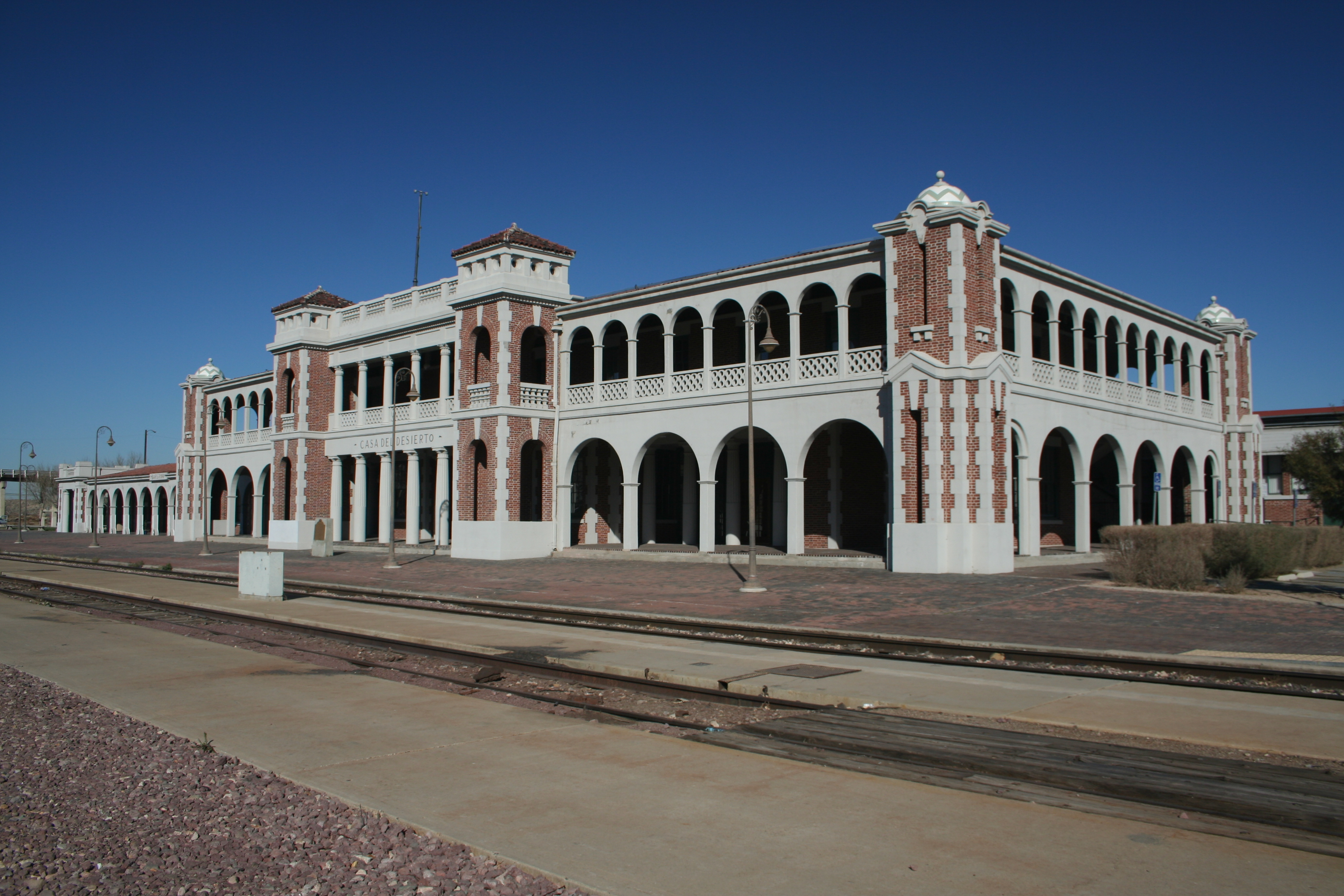
The Casa del Desierto ("House of the Desert") located in Barstow, California is seen here in 2006. The Spanish-Moroccan designed structure took two years to construct, and opened its doors on February 22, 1911.

Harvey discovered his calling when in 1873, he began a business venture with Jasper "Jeff" S. Rice to set up two eating houses two hundred and eighty miles apart along the Kansas Pacific Railroad, but once again the partnership was doomed.

Harvey's partnership with the Santa Fe began in 1876 when he struck a deal with an acquaintance, Charles Morse, the superintendent of the Atchison, Topeka and Santa Fe Railroad. Harvey opened eating houses along the railroad, and was not charged rent by Morse. The deal was sealed only with a handshake, but it would have huge ramifications for both parties. Steak with eggs was served for breakfast, while apple pie and coffee were offered as dessert. Harvey also ventured into the buffet car business. Boxcars were turned into dining rooms, serving passengers with Blue Points oysters, duck salmi, stuffed turkey, and Kansas City steak. At their peak, there were 84 Harvey Houses, all of which catered to wealthy and middle-class visitors alike and Harvey became known as "the Civilizer of the West."

Harvey also gained a boost in business with his incorporation of the "Harvey Girl". He hired women between the ages of 18 and 30 and did not permit them to marry until they had put in a full year of work. Harvey Girls resided in housing adjacent to the restaurants, where they were supervised by the most senior Girl, who enforced curfews and chaperoned male visits. Roughly 5000 Harvey Girls moved out West to work and ultimately marry. Harvey Houses continued to be built and operated into the 1960s. Harvey was the head of the Fred Harvey Company, which operated the hotel and restaurant chain under the leadership of his sons and grandsons until 1965. It was sold in 1968 to the Hawaii-based hospitality industry conglomerate Amfac, Inc.

== Innovations in marketing ==
Harvey is also known for pioneering the art of commercial cultural tourism. His "Indian Detours" were meant to provide an authentic Native American experience by having actors stage a certain lifestyle in the desert in order to sell tickets to unwitting tourists. Fred Harvey's feats of marketing did not stop at the attraction either, as for tour guides he used attractive women in outfits becoming their figures. This tactic was adapted from his restaurants, where Harvey Girls worked as waitresses.

Fred Harvey was also a postcard publisher, touted as "the best way to promote your Hotel or Restaurant." Most postcards were published in co-operation with the Detroit Publishing Company. Their Arizona "Phostint" postcards are collected worldwide.

== Death and legacy ==
Fred Harvey had suffered through many years of intestinal illness. In 1899, he traveled to London for diagnosis by a leading intestinal surgeon, Sir Frederick Treves. The diagnosis was colon cancer. Treves recommended surgery, which usually consisted of surgical exploration, removal of the tumor, and resection. Harvey survived the surgery, according to a report on October 15, 1899, but he continued to suffer from persistent abdominal pains. Too ill to travel, he remained in London for several months until finally sailing to the United States in May 1900. He arrived home on May 28. After months of continued illness, he died in Leavenworth, Kansas on February 9, 1901.

When Fred Harvey died, there were 47 Harvey House restaurants, 15 hotels, and 30 dining cars operating on the Santa Fe Railway.

While some have reported his last words to his sons as "Don't cut the ham too thin, boys," there is another account which addresses the realities of doing business:

"His sandwiches of ham or cheese with an extra slice of bread (three slices in all) for fifteen cents were known everywhere for their value. Of course he had to make his profit or he could not stay in business and therefore this story was told rather reverently by his employees and other denizens of the Southwest spaces. On his deathbed, instead of mentioning debts or bequests to his relatives, he was supposed to have murmured, "Cut the ham thinner, boys." Fred Harvey, through the Fred Harvey Company, is credited with creating the first "chain" restaurants in the United States. He is viewed as the "founding father of the American service industry." A Fred Harvey Museum is located in the former Harvey residence in Leavenworth, Kansas.

The Harvey Girls, a movie musical about Harvey House waitresses based on a novel of the same name was made in 1946.

== Bibliography ==
- Fried, Stephen (2010). Appetite for America: How Visionary Businessman Fred Harvey Built a Railroad Hospitality Empire that Civilized the Wild West. New York: Bantam Books. ISBN 9780553804379.
- Hegemann, Elizabeth Compton (1963). Navaho Trading Days. Albuquerque: University of New Mexico Press.
- Henderson, James D. (Winter 1966). "Meals by Fred Harvey". Arizona and the West. 8 (4): 305–322. JSTOR 40167249.
- Poling-Kempes, Lesley (1994). The Harvey Girls: Women Who Opened the West. Marlowe & Company. ISBN 978-1-56924-926-0.
- Weigle, Marta (Spring 1989). "From Desert to Disney World: The Santa Fe Railway and the Fred Harvey Company Display the Indian Southwest". Journal of Anthropological Research. 45 (1): 115–137. doi:10.1086/jar.45.1.3630174. JSTOR 3630174. S2CID 164097599.
