= Summer Stock =

1950 film by Charles Walters

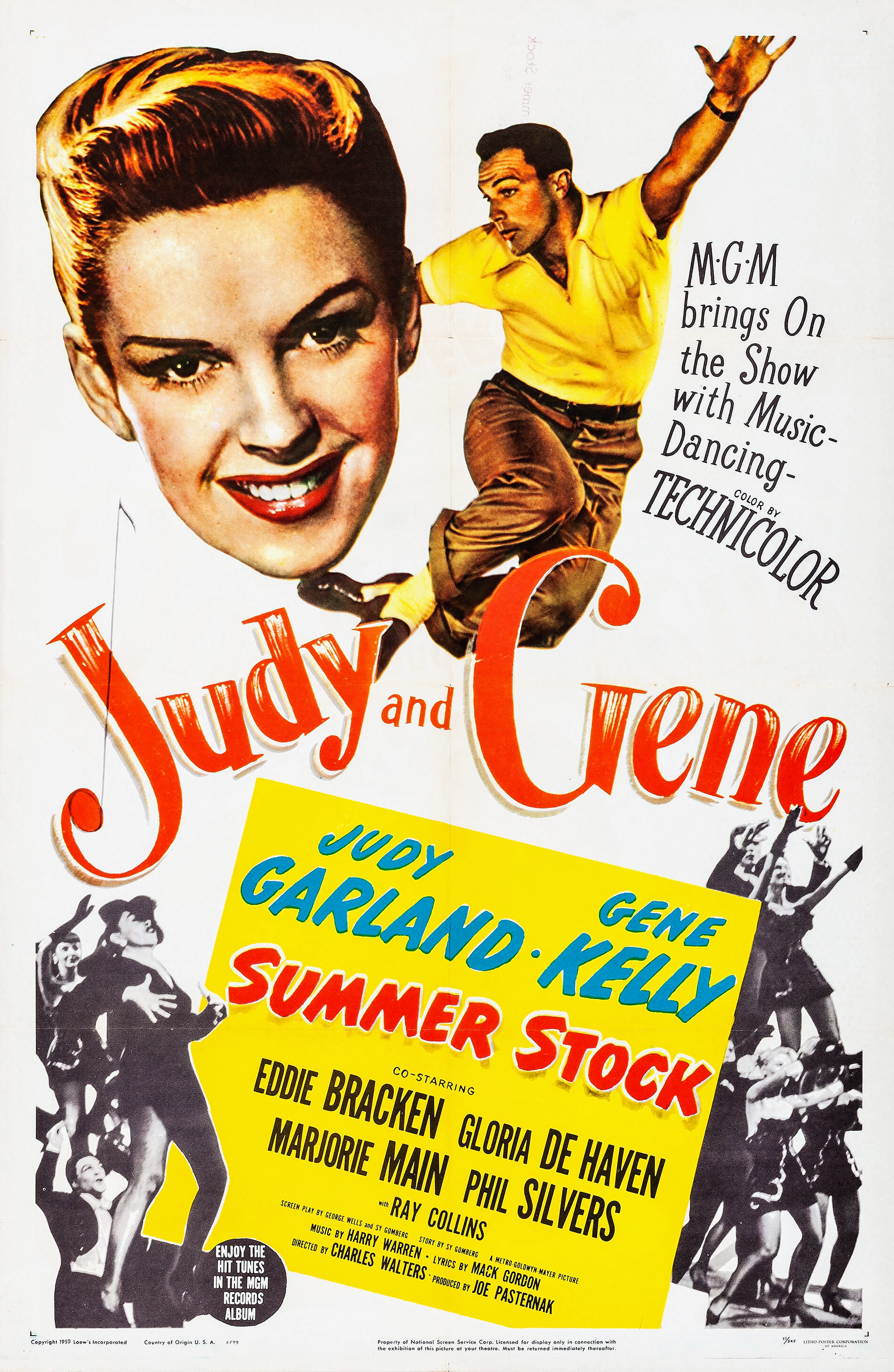
- Theatrical release poster
- Directed by: Charles Walters
- Screenplay by: George Wells; Sy Gomberg
- Story by: Sy Gomberg
- Produced by: Joe Pasternak
- Starring: Judy Garland; Gene Kelly
- Cinematography: Robert Planck
- Edited by: Albert Akst
- Music by: Conrad Salinger; Skip Martin
- Production company: Metro-Goldwyn-Mayer
- Distributed by: Loew's Inc.
- Release date: August 31, 1950
- Running time: 109 minutes
- Country: United States
- Language: English
- Budget: $2,025,000
- Box office: $3,357,000

Summer Stock is a 1950 American Technicolor musical film produced by Metro-Goldwyn-Mayer. It was directed by Charles Walters, stars Judy Garland and Gene Kelly, and features Eddie Bracken, Gloria DeHaven, Marjorie Main, and Phil Silvers. Musical numbers were staged by Nick Castle and Kelly.

Garland struggled with many personal problems during filming. Summer Stock was her final film for MGM, as well as her last onscreen pairing with Kelly. By mutual agreement, MGM terminated Garland's contract in September 1950, a decision the studio head Louis B. Mayer said he later regretted.

== Plot ==
Jane Falbury, owner of a family farm in Connecticut, is told by her only two farm hands that they are leaving because she has not paid them in a long time. The farm is in financial straits, so she decides to acquire a tractor to help with the labor, since the farm hands are gone. She goes to her fiancé Orville Wingait, who runs a local store, about buying a tractor on credit. Orville's father Jasper agrees to loan Jane the tractor on the condition she agrees to marry Orville.

When Jane returns to her farm, she discovers her younger sister, Abigail, has arrived with a musical theater troupe. Abigail explains that, after she dropped out of art school, she met Joe Ross, the director of the show, and became an actress. She then decided to offer his troupe the family farm to rehearse their summer stock theater production for Broadway producers. Jane confronts Joe, demanding they leave, but allows them to stay for the night. During dinnertime, Jane agrees to let the troupe use their barn on the condition they perform chores around the farm.

The next morning, Jane learns that Abigail is engaged to Joe. Orville arrives, telling Jane her neighbors have been complaining about the troupe. Jane goes to Jasper, stating the summer stock musical will not interfere with her work around the farm. While the troupe is working around the farm, Herb Blake, one of the stage hands, uses the tractor to remove a tree stump. However, he loses control and crashes the tractor. Joe does not tell Jane and tries to have the tractor repaired.

At the annual historical society dance that night, Jane performs a country dance duet with Joe. But after the theater people take over with their jazz music and dancing, Jasper confronts Jane. They argue, and Jane decides to return the tractor to him. When Joe shows Jane the damaged tractor, she is furious and demands that the troupe leave. The following morning, she discovers the troupe members have pooled all of their money and purchased a new tractor. Jane relents and allows the troupe to finish their musical.

With the opening just days away, Joe encourages Jane's interest in the theater, and the two begin to realize their mutual attraction. Jane returns to the farmhouse, where she sets the date for her marriage to Orville, despite having fallen in love with Joe. During rehearsals the next morning, Abigail complains about Joe's stage directions, as she feels overworked and unappreciated. Joe complains that Abigail's timing and musical rhythm are off. Abigail is consoled by Harrison I. Keath, the musical's leading man, and the two leave the farm together to star in a play in New York City.

After learning about Abigail's abrupt departure, Joe replaces her with Jane. Orville learns about Jane's casting and vows to shut down the show. Before the musical begins, Joe expresses his desire to spend the rest of his life with Jane, to which she agrees. In the musical's penultimate number, Jane performs the song "Get Happy" in a tuxedo jacket, black fedora, and black nylons. Orville arrives with Abigail, who wants her role reinstated. Jane refuses to relinquish the part. When Orville threatens to close the show, Abigail knocks him out but comforts him when he comes to. The troupe closes the show with a reprise of "Happy Harvest".

== Cast ==
- Judy Garland as Jane Falbury
- Gene Kelly as Joe D. Ross
- Eddie Bracken as Orville Wingait
- Gloria DeHaven as Abigail Falbury
- Marjorie Main as Esmé
- Phil Silvers as Herb Blake
- Ray Collins as Jasper G. Wingait
- Nita Bieber as Sarah Higgins
- Carleton Carpenter as Artie
- Hans Conried as Harrison I. Keath
- Dorothy Tuttle as stock company member (uncredited)

== Songs ==
All songs were written by Harry Warren (music) and Mack Gordon (lyrics) except where noted. Orchestration was divided between Conrad Salinger and Skip Martin.

1. "If You Feel Like Singing, Sing" – Garland
2. "(Howdy Neighbor) Happy Harvest" - Garland and company stock members
3. "Dig-Dig-Dig Dig For Your Dinner" – Kelly, Silvers and company stock members
4. "Mem'ry Island" – Gloria DeHaven and Hans Conried (dubbed by Pete Roberts)
5. "Portland Fancy" – (traditional New England contra dance tune) stock company members, Kelly and Garland
6. "You Wonderful You" (Jack Brooks and Saul Chaplin, lyrics and Warren, music) – Kelly and Garland
7. "Friendly Star" – Garland
8. "You Wonderful You" – Kelly
9. "All for You" (Chaplin) – Kelly and Garland
10. "You Wonderful You" (Reprise) – Kelly and Garland
11. "Heavenly Music" (Chaplin) – Kelly, Silvers and dogs
12. "Get Happy" (Harold Arlen (music) and Ted Koehler (lyrics)) – Garland and chorus
13. "(Howdy Neighbor) Happy Harvest" (finale) – Kelly, Garland, Silvers, and company stock members

== Production ==
=== Development ===
Summer Stock was in the mold of the "unknown saves show" musical genre. In 1948, MGM announced Garland and Kelly had been cast in the leading roles. However, in February 1949, the studio announced that Garland would be replaced by June Allyson. Garland was suspended in May 1949, and during the filming of Annie Get Your Gun (1950), she spent three months in a clinic for her drug addiction. Betty Hutton replaced her on that film, but Garland was reinstated in Summer Stock, which was her first one after her suspension.

Kelly was not the first choice for the role. Joe Pasternak originally wanted Mickey Rooney, but decided to cast Kelly because Rooney was no longer the box office draw he had once been. Busby Berkeley was originally slated to direct the film, but was replaced by Charles Walters before filming began. He and Kelly worked on it as a favor to Garland, whose career needed a boost at the time, and Walters later complimented Kelly for the help he gave to Garland. However, Kelly believed that he was miscast because he was far too old for the role, and felt the script was "a piece of crap".

=== Filming ===
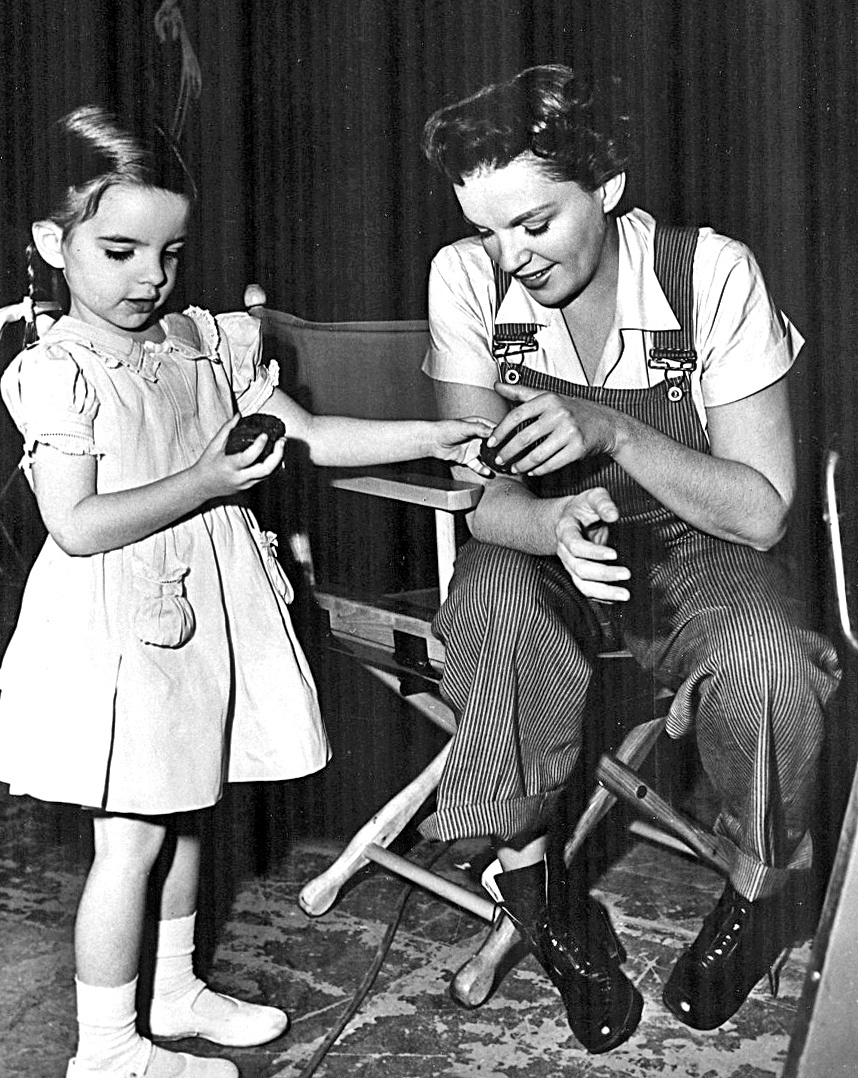
Judy Garland with daughter Liza Minnelli on the set

Principal photography began in November 1949. Garland had gained weight, and costume designer Walter Plunkett tried "to make her look as thin as possible, but we weren't miracle workers and we did not succeed." The filming was sometimes a struggle for Garland, who was facing many pressures in her personal life, aside from her heavy reliance on prescription medication, and she required frequent reassurance from Walters about her appearance and the quality of her performance. He later recalled that "flattery was food for her." She was frequently late during production of the film, and her behavior was erratic. After filming began, Pasternak asked Mayer if he should abandon the film because of Garland's behavior, but studio head Louis B. Mayer insisted that she be given another chance. Mayer said: "Judy Garland has made this studio a fortune in the good days, and the least we can do is to give her one more chance. If you stop production now, it'll finish her."

The production was also beset by tension between Kelly and dance director Nick Castle, who almost came to blows at one time. The difficulties on the set caused Walters to later call the film "absolute torture" for him.

Castle did not choreograph "You Wonderful You", "All for You", and "Portland Fancy" – these were done by Kelly – but did do "Dig-Dig-Dig Dig For Your Dinner" and other numbers. He also did not shoot "Get Happy", which was shot by Chuck Walters. Garland's work on the film ended in early February 1950, and it became evident to Walters that no "Garland payoff" appeared in the film. Garland agreed to appear for another week of filming, asked to sing "Get Happy", and wore the costume she wore in the "Mr. Monotony" number cut from Easter Parade. Garland had been treated by a hypnotist for weight loss and took off 15–20 pounds (6.8–9.1 kg); she appears considerably thinner in the number.

In his biography of Walters, Get Happy, author Brent Phillips points out that production records belie subsequent claims that the "Get Happy" number was produced three months after production ended. The number was produced in March 1950, and production on other musical numbers continued through April.

After filming, Garland embarked on a long-promised vacation. Soon, however, she was called back to star with Fred Astaire and Peter Lawford in the film Royal Wedding, replacing June Allyson, who was pregnant. Once again, she struggled to perform in the face of exhaustion and overwork. She was fired from Royal Wedding, and her contract with MGM was terminated through mutual agreement.

== Reception ==
=== Box office ===
According to MGM's records, Summer Stock earned $2,498,000 in distributor rentals in the United States and Canada and $859,000 overseas, resulting in a loss of $80,000. The film played to record audiences at the Capitol Theater in New York. Future playwright Edward Albee was at the theater at one performance, and later recalled that after the "Get Happy" number, "the audience watching the film was breathless for a moment and then, to a person, burst into sustained applause" as if it were a live performance.

=== Critical response ===
Bosley Crowther of The New York Times overall felt the film had "a rather standard plot which Director Charles Walters has been patient and sometimes tedious in distributing on the screen." Nevertheless, he felt Judy Garland "has her big chance to shine," particularly highlighting the "Get Happy" number with Garland "looking and performing her best." Harrison's Reports called the film "[a]n excellent Technicolor musical comedy-drama". Garland was praised as being "exceptionally good in this picture, the best she has been in a long time", while "Gene Kelly's dance routines are nothing short of superb."

The film is recognized by American Film Institute in this list:

- 2004: AFI's 100 Years...100 Songs:
  - "Get Happy" – No. 61

== Stage musical adaptation ==
A stage adaptation of the story by George Wells and Sy Gomberg premiered at the Goodspeed Opera House in 2023. The book of the musical was written by Cheri Steinkellner while the score retains many of the songs from the film with new ones added from the American songbook. The musical changed the characters name of Abigail to Gloria and cut the character of Esmé, while introducing a new subplot involving Orville's mother Margaret Wingate, with her trying to purchase the Falbury property and turn it into a commercial farming business. The world premiere included Corbin Bleu as Joe Ross and Danielle Wade as Jane Falbury.

== In popular culture ==
The film, specifically the "Get Happy" sequence, has been referenced in many pop culture contexts. Michael Jackson performed "Dangerous" that paid tribute to the film, most notably at the 1993 American Music Awards and the 1995 MTV Video Music Awards. He and his dancers wore suits, and a dancer stood in front of him until the beginning of the song, similar the film, in which Garland is covered by a dancer at first. Excerpts from the song can be heard in his performance.

British singer Duffy's "Rain on Your Parade" music video was also inspired by that sequence, and she can be seen wearing an outfit similar to Garland's, and dancing against a white background along with some male dancers dressed in suits.

Actress Katie Holmes paid homage to Garland, performing "Get Happy" on the television show So You Think You Can Dance. She wore a similar outfit and danced alongside male dancers in suits in front of a match-painted background.

Drag queen and recording artist Alaska Thunderfuck's music video "Anus" pays homage to the "Get Happy" sequence. A scene in the video shows her in a blazer and tilted fedora, backed by two male dancers, dancing in a similar fashion to the original number. This is a tribute to Garland and the song's importance in the LGBT community.
