= The Pirate (1948 film) =

1948 film by Vincente Minnelli

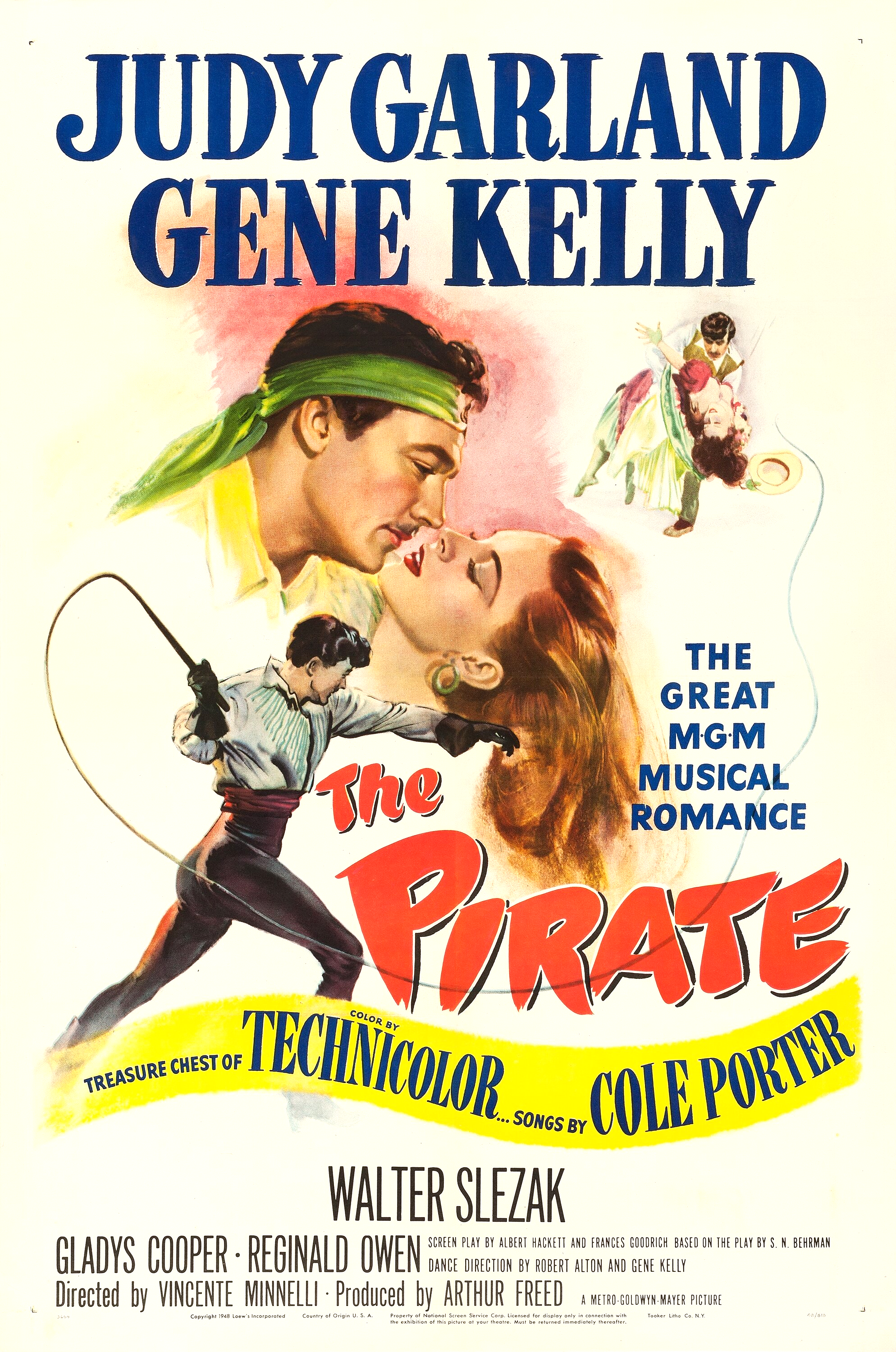
- Theatrical release poster
- Directed by: Vincente Minnelli
- Screenplay by: Albert Hackett; Frances Goodrich
- Based on: The Pirate; 1942 play by S. N. Behrman
- Produced by: Arthur Freed
- Starring: Judy Garland; Gene Kelly; Walter Slezak
- Cinematography: Harry Stradling
- Edited by: Blanche Sewell
- Music by: Cole Porter (songs); Lennie Hayton (musical direction)
- Production company: Metro-Goldwyn-Mayer
- Distributed by: Loew's Inc.
- Release date: May 20, 1948
- Running time: 102 minutes
- Country: United States
- Language: English
- Budget: $3,768,000
- Box office: $2.956 million

The Pirate is a 1948 American romantic musical film directed by Vincente Minnelli from a screenplay by Albert Hackett and Frances Goodrich, based on the 1942 play by S. N. Behrman. It stars Judy Garland and Gene Kelly, with Walter Slezak, Gladys Cooper, Reginald Owen, the Nicholas Brothers, and George Zucco in supporting roles. The film features songs by Cole Porter.

== Plot ==
In the 1830s, young Manuela Alva longs to escape her small Caribbean village of Calvados and fantasizes about being swept away by the legendary pirate Macoco, also known as "Mack the Black". However, her stern aunt Inez has arranged for her to marry Don Pedro Vargas, the rotund, dull and much older new mayor of the town. Although Manuela is less than thrilled, she reluctantly agrees to marry the wealthy Don Pedro, as she is an orphan with no dowry, and her aunt and uncle—who raised her after her parents died—are struggling financially.

Manuela, who craves romance and adventure, persuades Inez to take her on a trip to the nearby seaside town of Port Sebastian before her wedding. Shortly after arriving, Manuela is spotted by Serafin, the handsome leader of a traveling troupe of performers, who becomes instantly smitten with her. Manuela rebuffs Serafin's advances, insisting she is engaged, and he invites her to his show that night. Unable to sleep, she sneaks out to see Serafin's show, where he hypnotizes Manuela with a spinning mirror, thinking that she will admit that she loves him. Instead, she wildly sings and dances about her love for Macoco. Serafin awakens her with a kiss, and she flees in horror.

On Manuela's wedding day, Serafin climbs into her room and begs her to call off the wedding and run away with his troupe. Don Pedro bursts into the room and prepares to flog Serafin. Alone with Don Pedro, Serafin quickly recognizes him as the fugitive pirate Macoco, now retired and obese, and blackmails him with this information, threatening to expose his identity. Desperate to keep his identity a secret, Don Pedro plays along with Serafin's scheme to masquerade as Macoco in order to win over Manuela.

Proclaiming himself to be Macoco, Serafin demands that the townspeople bring Manuela to him or else he will burn down the town. Manuela, pretending to nobly sacrifice herself, agrees to go with him. However, one of Serafin's troupers accidentally reveals the ruse to Manuela, infuriating her. As revenge, she first pretends to seduce Serafin, then insults him and throws objects at him. After accidentally knocking him out with a painting, she rushes to his aid and realizes that she loves him. Manuela sings "You Can Do No Wrong" while cradling Serafin's head in her lap, and they kiss.

Don Pedro convinces the viceroy that Serafin is the real Macoco after planting stolen jewels in Serafin's prop trunk. Serafin is subsequently arrested and charged with Macoco's crimes. On the night of Serafin's hanging, Manuela looks at the false evidence, recognizes a bracelet with the same design as the wedding ring that Don Pedro gave her, and realizes that he is the pirate.

Serafin convinces the viceroy to let him put on one final show before he is hanged. After performing "Be a Clown", Serafin plans to use his spinning mirror to hypnotize Don Pedro into admitting he is Macoco. When Inez breaks the mirror, Manuela pretends to be hypnotized and sings "Love of My Life", vowing everlasting devotion to Macoco. As Manuela and Serafin kiss, Don Pedro grows jealous and reveals himself as the true Macoco, prompting Serafin's troupe to attack him while the lovers embrace. Manuela joins Serafin's act and they sing a reprise of "Be a Clown".

== Cast ==
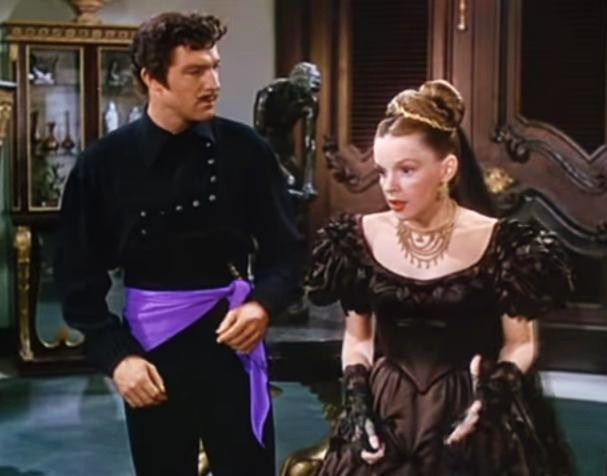
Gene Kelly and Judy Garland

- Judy Garland as Manuela
- Gene Kelly as Serafin
- Walter Slezak as Don Pedro Vargas
- Gladys Cooper as Aunt Inez
- Reginald Owen as the advocate
- George Zucco as the viceroy
- Specialty Dance sequence by the Nicholas Brothers
- Lester Allen as Uncle Capucho
- Lola Deem as Isabella
- Ellen Ross as Mercedes
- Mary Jo Ellis as Lizarda
- Jean Dean as Casilda
- Marion Murray as Eloise
- Ben Lessy as Gumbo
- Jerry Bergen as Bolo
- Val Setz as juggler
- Gaudsmith Brothers as themselves
- Cully Richards as Trillo
- Dorothy Tuttle as dancer (uncredited)

== Production ==
Vincente Minnelli directed the film, from a screenplay based on the 1942 Broadway play by S. N. Behrman, which had starred Alfred Lunt and Lynn Fontanne. Opening at the Martin Beck Theatre on November 25, 1942, The Pirate played for 176 performances before the screen rights were purchased by Metro-Goldwyn-Mayer for $225,000, equal to $4,186,298 today. While the Lunts themselves expressed interest in bringing the story to the screen, MGM envisioned the project as a comedy for William Powell and either Myrna Loy or Hedy Lamarr. Over the next two years, more than a half-dozen scenarists, producers, and directors worked on ideas for developing the script.

It was the play's original scenic designer, Lemuel Ayers, who suggested to MGM's preeminent musical producer Arthur Freed that The Pirate would make an effective musical. Freed presented the idea to Judy Garland, his top musical star, and her husband, director Vincente Minnelli. Garland was then at the top of her box-office stature in Hollywood, and Minnelli was the logical choice as director, as he had successfully helmed most of her recent movies (Meet Me in St. Louis, Ziegfeld Follies, and The Clock). Garland was eager to demonstrate her talents as a sophisticated leading comedienne in the same class as Katharine Hepburn, and MGM saw a perfect opportunity to reunite her with Gene Kelly, her co-star in the hit 1942 musical For Me and My Gal. Kelly was newly returned from his navy service in World War II and a nominee for Academy Award for Best Actor for Anchors Aweigh. Freed engaged legendary composer Cole Porter to write the score for a $100,000 fee (equal to $1,441,878 today) and entrusted Anita Loos and Joseph Than with the film's scenario. They fashioned a role for Lena Horne, that of Conchita, a local dressmaker, and Manuela (Garland)'s confidante.

After five months of work, Loos and Than offered a reading of their script to Freed, Minnelli, Garland, Kelly and Porter. To the horror of the listeners, the team had produced an awkward, unusable reversal of Behrman's original premise. Although the female lead remained an impressionable Caribbean girl besotted by dreams of a legendary pirate, the leading man was no longer a touring actor impersonating her daring seaman, but a dancing pirate who pretended to be an entertainer. Producer Freed immediately replaced Loos and Than with the great husband and wife writing team of Albert Hackett and Frances Goodrich. In two months, they turned in a witty and workable adaptation of the Behrman original, geared to Porter's songs. The role for Horne was dropped from their script.

By October 1946, Cole Porter had turned in eight songs and departed for New York. One of these, "[It's Chic In] Martinique" was dropped when Horne's role was eliminated, but seven other Porter numbers were slotted in the new script. The creative personnel assigned to the film comprised a solid crew from the Freed Unit at MGM: choreographer Robert Alton, conductor Lennie Hayton, orchestrator Conrad Salinger, and vocal arranger Kay Thompson. Garland began prerecording the score at the studio on December 27, 1946.

Barbara Karinska, the famous costumier, was engaged to execute the costume designs of Tom Keogh. "One of Judy's eight costume designs," said Keogh, "was a replica of an 1830 Worth gown." It cost $3,462.23 to make. Another was a white satin wedding dress, with handmade antique lace from France and embroidered with a thousand pearls; it cost $3,313.12. Each of the women's costumes had five petticoats and all the embroidery was done by hand. The total wardrobe cost was $141,595.30.

Leading man Gene Kelly approached his role with enthusiasm. His inspirations for the character of Serafin were his boyhood cinema heroes: the swashbuckling athleticism of Douglas Fairbanks and the hammy flamboyance of John Barrymore. He was also eager to express his characterization in the film through dance, using ballet more than he had previously. "I wanted the opportunity to do a different kind of dancing," said Kelly, "a popular style with a lot of classic forms, acrobatics, and athletics." An aspiring film director, Kelly also worked closely with Minnelli during the shoot to learn the technical end of filmmaking behind the camera. Minnelli and Kelly established a collaborative working relationship at this time, which reached its zenith a few years later with their most successful film as director/star, An American in Paris.

Everyone involved in the film's production possessed exemplary credentials: Walter Slezak and Gladys Cooper were cast, respectively, as Don Pedro and Manuela's Aunt Inez; supporting roles were filled with veteran players Reginald Owen, George Zucco, Ben Lessy, and the Nicholas Brothers. Behind the scenes were cameraman Harry Stradling and art director Jack Martin Smith.

Principal photography on The Pirate began on February 17, 1947. Almost immediately, the film was beset by problems. Unhappy with Kay Thompson's cacophonous arrangement of the opening number, "Mack the Black", Freed ordered the song re-recorded. Garland termed Thompson's treatment of the song "insanity", and Cole Porter diplomatically offered that the number "has me in a dither." Minnelli wanted to expand Kelly's role, and new scenes had to be written and existing scenes re-shuffled. Elaborate sets were built to Minnelli's exacting instructions. For Kelly's number Nina, a plaza in the town of Calvados was built on a soundstage at MGM, with a pavilion in the middle and the streets unevenly paved with cobblestones for realistic effect. The cost was $86,660.00.

Paramount among the problems plaguing the shooting schedule was Judy Garland's increasing inability to perform. Years of overwork at MGM, postpartum depression following the birth of her daughter Liza Minnelli nine months earlier, and a heavy reliance on prescription medication finally caught up with the twenty-five-year-old star, and she often failed to show up on time for work, if at all. According to her biographer John Fricke, Garland was also unhappy with the way The Pirate was shaping up. Despite her initial enthusiasm to play a character outside her usual winsome all-American roles, Garland "began to feel adrift in the imaginative self-indulgence that suddenly surrounded her on the set of The Pirate. Her instincts told her that Minnelli, Kelly, and [Kay] Thompson were unwittingly producing a motion picture for themselves- and for an audience that might not exist." Her marriage to Minnelli began to unravel during the shoot, and her consumption of prescription stimulants and sedatives increased. After suffering a panicked breakdown on the set during the filming of the "Voodoo" musical number, Garland was hospitalized for a couple of weeks. The crew and her co-workers were sympathetic to Garland's travails, testifying that she was not a temperamental star but an overworked young woman struggling with health and addiction issues. Out of 135 days of rehearsals and shooting, Garland was absent for 99. But on her last full day of filming, Garland did retakes and pickups on the "Be a Clown" finale and five other scenes, changing wardrobe, hairstyle, and makeup at least three times for more than twenty-five takes.

Several songs were cut, and others moved around. Garland and Kelly were to perform a tempestuous dance to "Voodoo". The sequence was filmed, but MGM executives felt the choreography was too openly sexual for audiences of the day, and they ordered the number removed. When MGM chieftain Louis B. Mayer saw the footage he was so outraged he ordered the negatives burned. "If that exhibition gets on the screen", he shouted, "we'll be raided by the police!" No footage of the number is known to exist today. Mayer also disliked the erotic style of Kelly's "The Pirate Ballet". Garland's rendition of "Love of My Life" was excised, leaving only her reprise of the number near the end of the film. Her show-stopping performance of "Mack the Black" was restaged in a more straightforward musical comedy style. The dancing Nicholas Brothers joined Kelly for the first rendition of "Be a Clown", but theater owners in the South removed the number from their prints, fearing white audiences would not accept two Black dancers performing with a White dancer as equals.

The score was nominated for an Academy Award for Original Music Score, losing out to another MGM musical, Easter Parade, also starring Garland and produced by Arthur Freed.

The film was shot in Technicolor.

=== "Be a Clown" ===
It has been suggested that Cole Porter's "Be a Clown" was plagiarized by producer/songwriter Arthur Freed four years later for his “Make 'em Laugh”, a spectacular number written for Donald O'Connor in Freed's iconic 1952 musical Singin' in the Rain. In a winter 2002 article in the Michigan Quarterly Review, “Singin' in the Rain, an interview with Betty Comden and Adolph Green”, the film's screenwriter Betty Comden recalled, "How [Arthur Freed] could have written it in the first place — and not realized — is still a mystery. We have no idea, and we never brought it up with Arthur, either before or after that day ... It's fabulous, but the song's exactly like 'Be a Clown."

== Reception ==
The film had its world premiere on May 15, 1948, in Montreal, Quebec, billed as the "Pre Radio City Showing.” It premiered in the U.S. at the Radio City Music Hall in New York on May 20, 1948, and went into general release on June 10, 1948, having cost $3,768,496 ($553,888 over budget).

Audiences failed to respond to the film's high-brow ambitions, and while many critics hailed its sophistication, box office results failed to follow suit. The British author David Shipman, in his book The Great Movie Stars: The Golden Years, described it as being "a neat moneymaker, but otherwise probably the least successful of Garland's MGM films."

The New York Times offered, "The Pirate, which came yesterday to the Radio City Music Hall, is a dazzling, spectacular extravaganza, shot through with all the colors of the rainbow and then some that Technicolor patented. It takes this mammoth show some time to generate a full head of steam, but when it gets rolling it's thoroughly delightful."

The New York Herald Tribune wrote, "At the Music Hall there is more dancing than script; more production pomp than sensible staging. But with Gene Kelly hoofing like a dervish, Judy Garland changing character at the drop of a hat, and resplendent trappings, the show is bouncing and beautiful."

The Chicago Tribune thought, "Certainly no effort was spared; the cast is star-studded, and the settings and costumes are strikingly handsome. Yet The Pirate is disappointing, especially in regards to its music. The film has its moments, especially those in which Kelly dominates the screen. Judy Garland handles a song as well as ever and has several excellent comedy scenes."

Time advised, "As an all-out try at artful movie making, this is among the most interesting pictures of the year. Unluckily, much of the considerable artistry that has gone into this production collides head-on with artiness or is spoiled by simpler kinds of miscalculations. Miss Garland's tense, ardent straightforwardness is sometimes very striking. The total effect of the picture is entertainment troubled by delusions of art and vice-versa."

The Nation critic James Agee stated: "Color worth seeing, and Gene Kelly's very ambitious, painfully misguided performance, by John Barrymore out of the elder Douglas Fairbanks. Judy Garland is good; and Vincente Minelli's direction gives the whole business bulge and splendor. My sympathies are largely with them, for they're all really trying something—and in musical comedy, whose wonderful possibilities are too seldom realized by 'artists,' good or bad."

Two years later, director Vincente Minnelli said in an interview to the French film magazine Cahiers du Cinéma, "I was very pleased with the way the film turned out. Judy gave one of her best performances and the Cole Porter songs were excellent. Unfortunately, the merchandising on the film was bad, and it failed to go over when it was released."

Star Gene Kelly told writer Tony Thomas in 1974, "I had decided on this Fairbanks-Barrymore approach to the role at the very start and Minnelli entirely agreed with it. It didn't occur to us until the picture hit the public that what we had done was indulge in a huge inside joke. It was done tongue-in-cheek but it didn't really come off, and that's my fault. But I thought Judy was superb- and what Minnelli did with color and design in that film is as fine as anything that has ever been done."

Producer Arthur Freed said in 1969, "When we did The Pirate Judy wasn't feeling well. I think it's one of the best pictures she's done. It didn't lose money, but it wasn't the success I hoped it would be. I think one of the reasons was the public didn't want to see Judy as a sophisticate. I think today The Pirate would be a hit. It was twenty years ahead of its time."

Composer Cole Porter said later that he felt The Pirate was "a $5,000,000 Hollywood picture that was unspeakably wretched, the worst that money could buy."

According to MGM accounts, the film earned $1,874,000 in the US and Canada and $782,000 elsewhere, resulting in a loss to the studio of $2,290,000.

Garland and Kelly were slated to begin a new musical, Easter Parade, after wrapping work on The Pirate. With a score by Irving Berlin, and with Freed producing and Minnelli directing, rehearsals began. But Garland's therapist felt it was unwise to have her husband direct her in another film so soon after The Pirate, so Minnelli was removed as director by Arthur Freed and replaced by Charles Walters. Soon thereafter, Gene Kelly broke his ankle playing softball at home. Freed called Fred Astaire, who had recently retired from films, and asked if he would replace Kelly. After obtaining Kelly's blessing, Astaire jumped at the chance of working with Judy Garland for the first time. The shooting of the film went smoothly, coming in ahead of schedule and under budget. When released in July 1948, Easter Parade was a smash-hit, breaking box-office records and putting Garland, Astaire, and everyone involved on a new level of success.

== Restored Blu-ray ==
On November 24, 2020, Warner Archive released a restored 4K transfer of the film on Blu-ray. High-Def Digest wrote in their review, "A brand new 4K restoration from Warner Archive yields an absolutely glorious 1080p/AVC MPEG-4 transfer that's distinguished by crystal clarity, superior contrast, perfectly balanced color, and beautifully resolved grain that lends the picture a lovely film-like feel."
