= Dorothy Tuttle =

American dancer (1918–1998)

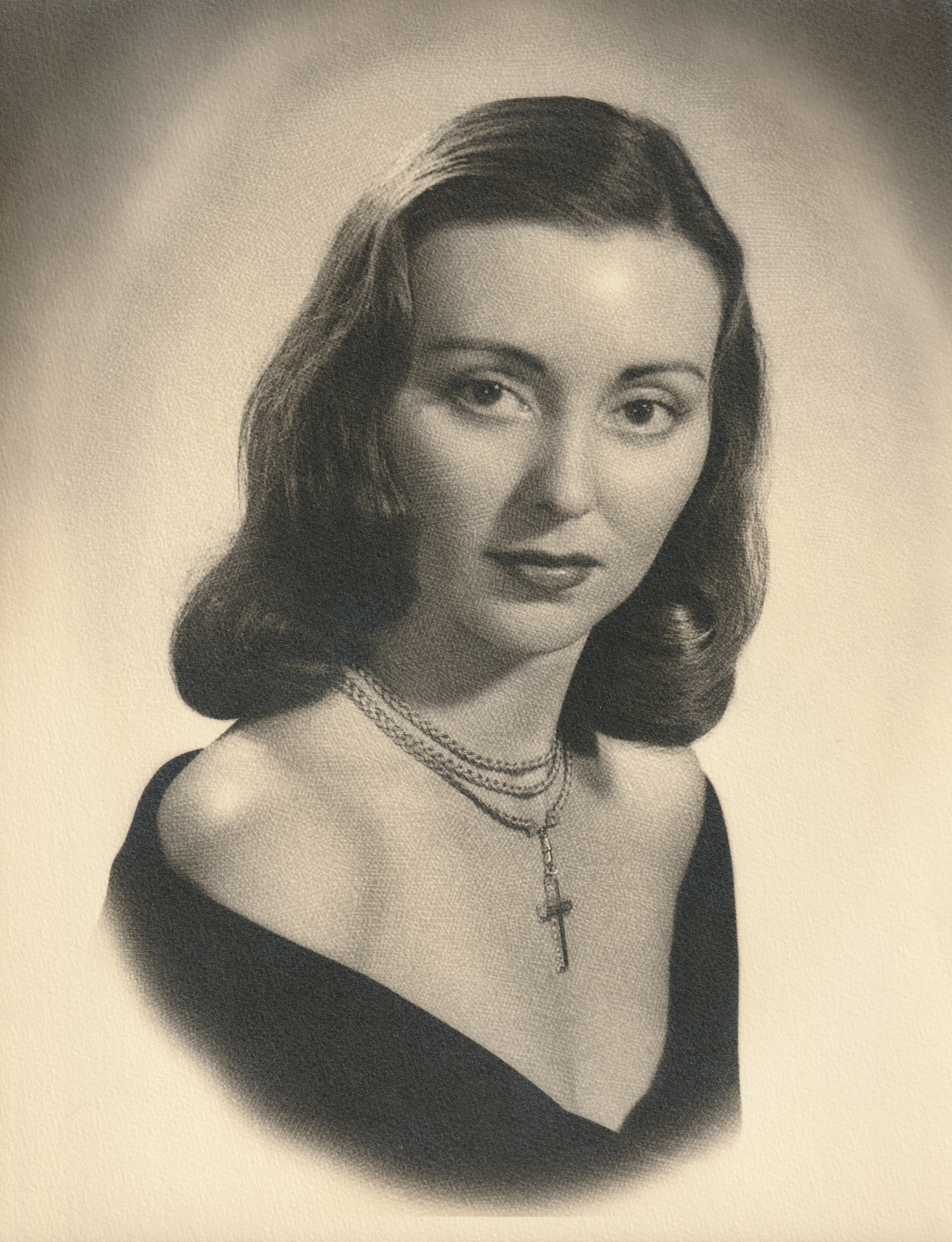
Dorothy Tuttle in the 1940s

Dorothy Tuttle (born Dorothy Polk Tuttle; April 21, 1918 – August 12, 1998) was an American dancer and performer, primarily working at Metro-Goldwyn-Mayer in film musicals of the 1940s.

A familiar face in popular MGM musicals, Tuttle showcased her talent and artistry in many classic films: playing a waitress in the Judy Garland musical The Harvey Girls; a trolley passenger whom Judy Garland sings to in the classic "The Trolley Song" in Meet Me in St. Louis; and as Gene Kelly’s dance partner for the song "Niña" in The Pirate, in which Kelly grabs a lit cigarette from her lips, places it in his mouth, turns it inward, and then kisses Tuttle with the lit cigarette still inside his mouth.

== Early life ==
Born in Los Angeles to Walter and Estrella Tuttle, Dorothy was trained in ballet from a young age. To help supplement the household income, Tuttle sought work as a dancer. She was urged by a friend to audition for MGM studios in 1937 and was hired for the film Rosalie as a background dancer. She continued to work at MGM until the early 1950s. Since she was still a teenager, she attended the studio high school.

== Career ==
Tuttle appeared as a dancer and background performer in dozens of MGM films, including Marie Antoinette (1938), Ziegfeld Girl (1941), Born to Sing (1942), Meet Me In St. Louis (1944), The Harvey Girls (1946) and Summer Stock (1950). Due to her versatility, she was heavily featured in these films and was one of the few of the "MGM chorus" who had a studio contract. Her ballet skills were also utilized when she worked on the set of various Esther Williams movies, teaching the swimmers ballet dance movements.

"Tut", a nickname Tuttle acquired while at MGM, was often seen alongside fellow dancer Dorothy Gilmore Raye in the musicals of the Arthur Freed Unit. They remained lifelong friends and later in life appeared together in two documentaries: Judy Garland: Beyond the Rainbow (1997) and MGM: When the Lion Roars (1992).

Tuttle said of her time at MGM working with Judy Garland:

“Judy was to me the great talent of the twentieth century. I was fortunate enough to work with many people; I worked with both Fred Astaire and Gene Kelly. Judy had the greatest talent of anyone I ever worked with: natural talent. But not only the great talent—a wonderful person. Loving. A lot of laughter. And she loved everyone, reached out to everyone….”

She also worked for other studios during this time: 20th Century Fox, in Tin Pan Alley (1940), Call Me Mister (1951); Warner Bros, in Tea for Two (1950) and Lullaby of Broadway (1951); and Columbia Pictures, where she danced with Marilyn Monroe in Ladies of the Chorus (1948). Tuttle’s training as a ballet dancer made her adaptable to the different styles of dance required in a variety of musicals.

Her final screen appearances were in An American in Paris (1951) as a ballet dancer and Love is Better than Ever (1952), in which she was in the early stages of pregnancy with her first son. Tuttle retired from film that same year to raise a family. She married Gene La Tour in 1950 and had 3 sons. She later became active in Santa Monica civic groups working to preserve historic sites, in the Santa Monica Republican Women’s Club, and in the Santa Monica Presbyterian Church, where she was volunteer wedding director.

== Later life and death ==
Tuttle divorced La Tour in the early 1980s and married James Nitch in 1984, who published The Mysterious Chronicles of Oz under the pen name Onyx Madden in 1985. She was also active with The International Wizard of Oz Club in the 1980s and 1990s, making numerous appearances at conventions and events. During her second marriage, she moved to Encino and was a volunteer at the Encino Women’s Club, the Old Treasures Club and the National Charity League of Los Angeles.

Tuttle died in Encino, Los Angeles on August 12, 1998, at the age of 80.
