= Fred Harvey Company =

Owner of the Harvey House chain of rail hospitality establishments

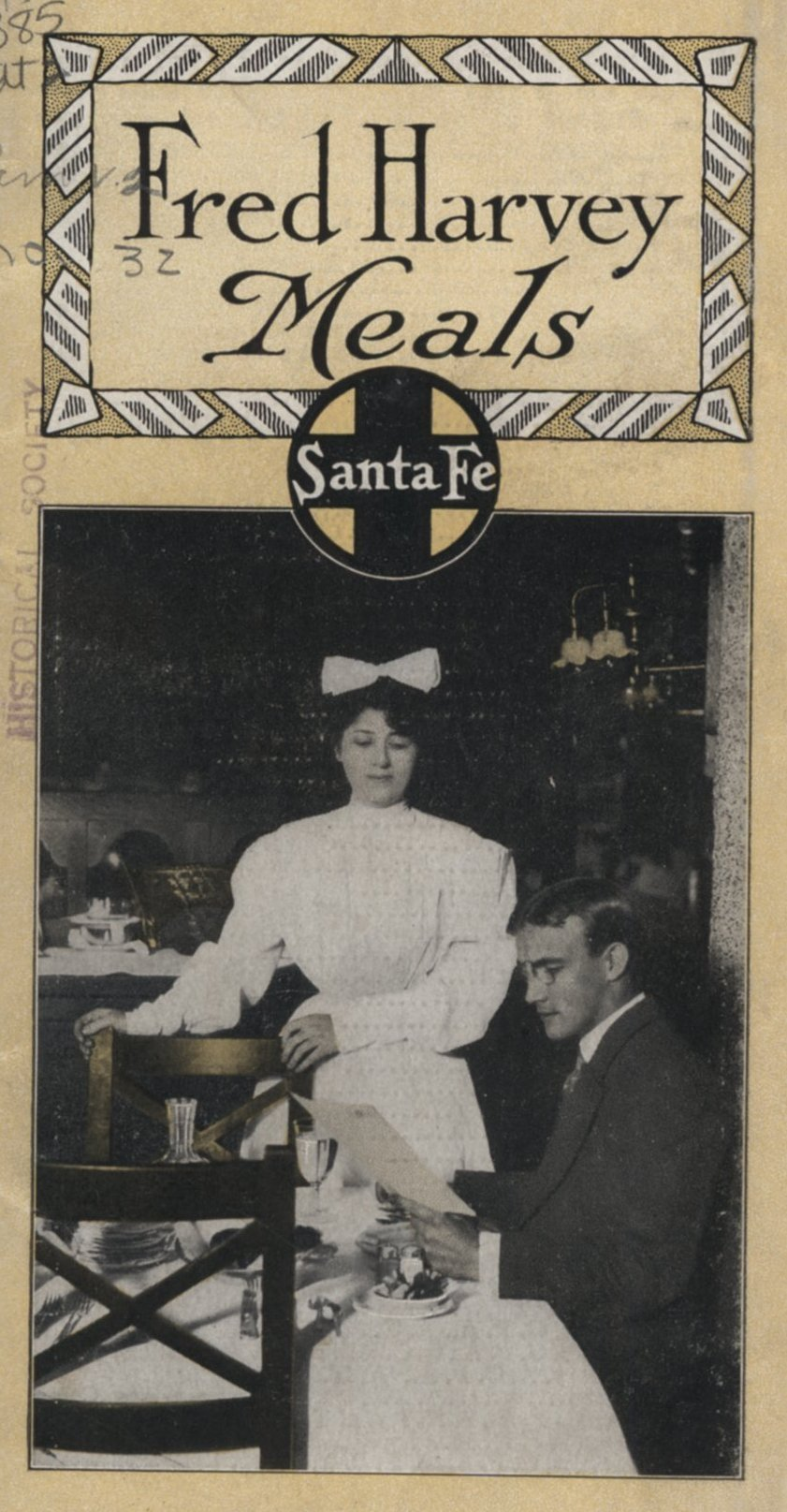
A cover of the 1909 Santa Fe Railway pamphlet describing Fred Harvey hotels, dining rooms and sample menus

The Fred Harvey Company was the owner of the Harvey House chain of restaurants, hotels and other hospitality industry businesses alongside railroads in the Western United States. It was founded in 1876 by Fred Harvey to cater to the growing number of train passengers.

When Harvey died in 1901, his family inherited 45 restaurants and 20 dining cars in 12 states. During World War II, Harvey Houses opened again to serve soldiers as they traveled in troop trains across the U.S. By 1968, when it was sold to Amfac, Inc. (Xanterra Parks and Resorts, as of 2002), the Fred Harvey Company was the sixth largest food retailer in the United States. It left behind a lasting legacy of good food, dedication to customers, decent treatment of employees, and preservation of local traditions.

== History ==
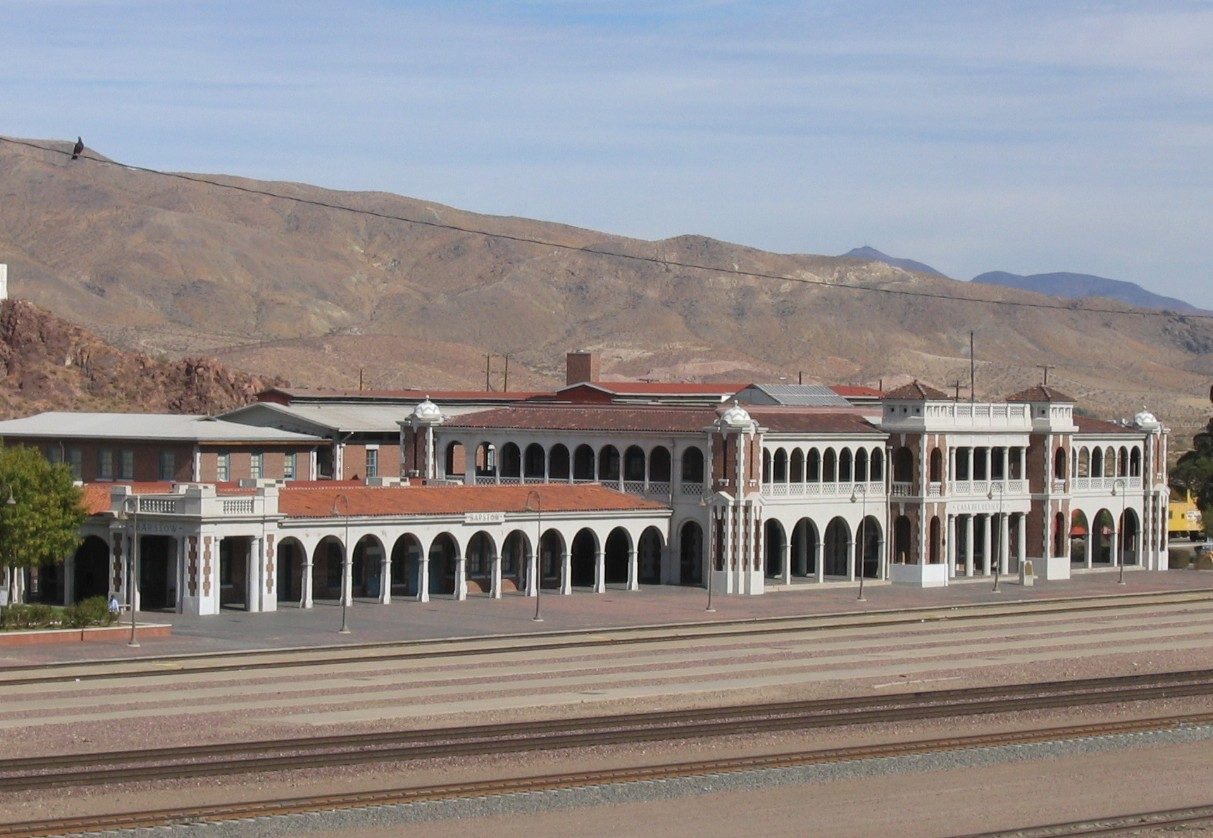
The Casa del Desierto ("House of the Desert") located in Barstow, California, is seen here in 2006. The Spanish-Moroccan designed structure took two years to construct, and opened its doors on February 22, 1911. The building has been designated as a California Historical Landmark, #892.

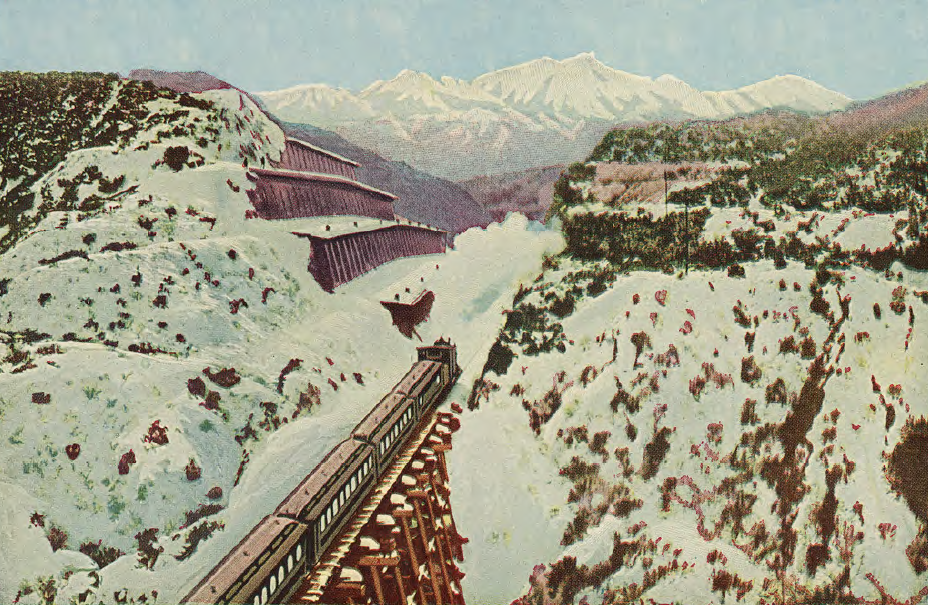
Cajon summit and the Santa Fe Railroad, c. 1919. From a Fred Harvey Co. tourist brochure.

The company traces its origins to the 1876 opening of three railroad eatery-hotels located at Wallace, Kansas, Lawrence, Kansas, and Hugo, Colorado, on the Kansas Pacific Railway. These cafés were opened by Fred Harvey, then a freight agent for the Chicago, Burlington & Quincy Railroad, who emigrated to the United States from London, England, when he was 17 years old. These initial few café operations ended within a year, but their success had convinced Harvey of the potential profitability in providing higher-quality food and service experiences at railroad eating establishments. The Burlington Railroad (Harvey's longtime employer) declined his offer of establishing a system-wide operation with an eatery at every en-route meal stop, but the Atchison, Topeka & Santa Fe Railway (AT&SF) subsequently contracted with Harvey for what would become several "Harvey Houses" on an experimental basis. Harvey initially took over a 20-seat lunchroom at Santa Fe's Topeka, Kansas depot, which began operating under his guidance in January 1876.

In 1878, Harvey started the officially named first Harvey House dining house-hotel establishment along the AT&SF tracks in Florence, Kansas. The rapid growth of the chain soon followed, with the second location opening in Lakin, Kansas in 1879.

Fred Harvey is credited with creating the first restaurant chain in the U.S. Harvey and his company also became leaders in promoting tourism in the American Southwest in the late 19th century. Harvey promoted the region by inspiring the "Indian curio" (native memento) shop, as well as guided tours through the American southwest called "Indian Detours". The company, with its employees including renowned waitresses later known as Harvey Girls, successfully brought higher standards of food service and cuisine to a region then mainly known as "the Wild West". In 1946, the Harvey Girls' popularity grew even stronger when Judy Garland starred in the film version of Samuel Hopkins Adams’s novel The Harvey Girls.

Despite the decline of passenger train patronage in the U.S. in the 20th century with the advent of the automobile, the company survived and prospered by marketing its services to the motoring public. After 1926, Harvey Cars were used in the provision of "Indian Detours" services offered from a number of Harvey hotel locations. Fred Harvey's son Ford began the series of guided tours into the interior of the west. The company purchased a hotel in Santa Fe called La Fonda, and it became headquarters for the Indian Detours, led by guides called Couriers. The company continued to adjust to the trends. During World War II, Fred Harvey Houses reopened across the Southwest to feed American soldiers. In 1943, it is estimated that the Fred Harvey Company served more than one million meals each month in dining cars and Harvey Houses. In the late 1950s it operated, for the first 15 years, the then-new landmark Illinois Tollway "Oases" which were built above the Interstate 294 highway in the Chicago suburbs by Standard Oil of Indiana (Amoco).

The Fred Harvey legacy was continued in the family until the death of a grandson in 1965. Portions of the Fred Harvey Company have continued to operate since 1968 as part of a larger hospitality industry conglomerate, Amfac, Inc. which became Xanterra Parks and Resorts in 2002.

=== Company growth and relationship with AT&SF ===
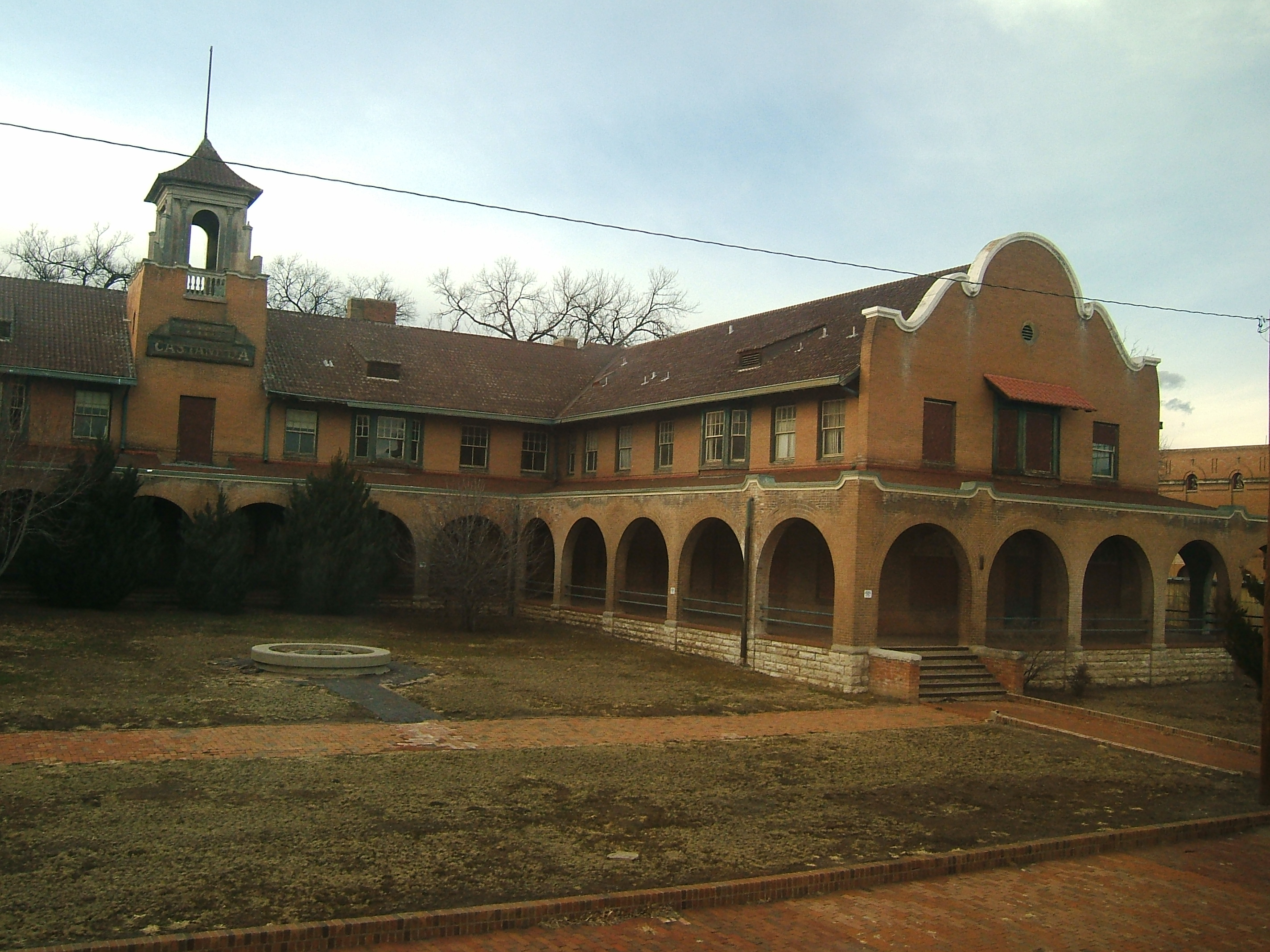
The Hotel Castañeda, Las Vegas, New Mexico, as seen in 2007. An early mission revival style Harvey House (1899) and sister hotel to the Alvarado in Albuquerque, New Mexico.

Before the inclusion of dining cars in passenger trains became common practice, a rail passenger's only option for meal service in transit was to patronize one of the roadhouses often located near the railroad's water stops. At its worst, fare could be as poor as sometimes rancid meat, cold beans, and sometimes week-old coffee. If passengers lacked time for meals, they could purchase overpriced sandwiches and fruit on the train platform or the cars. Such poor conditions contributed to making westward travel generally unpleasant at the time.

The subsequent growth and development of the Fred Harvey Company was closely related to that of AT&SF. Under the terms of an oral agreement, Harvey opened his first depot restaurant in Topeka, Kansas, in January 1876. Railroad officials and passengers alike were impressed with Fred Harvey's strict standards for high quality food and first class service. Before opening the Topeka restaurant, Harvey ordered entirely new silverware, stemware, and dishes. As a result, AT&SF entered into subsequent contracts with Harvey wherein he was given unlimited funds to set up a series of what were dubbed "eating houses" along most of the route. At more prominent locations, these eating houses evolved into hotels, many of which survive today, such as La Posada in Winslow, Arizona. By the late 1880s, there was a Fred Harvey dining facility located every 100 miles along the AT&SF, the interval in which its trains needed to refuel and load water.

AT&SF agreed to convey fresh meat and produce free-of-charge to any Harvey House via its own private line of refrigerator cars, the Santa Fe Refrigerator Despatch, bringing in food from every corner of the U.S. There were often break-ins at the Houses or parked refrigerator cars for the food and ingredients, as they were fresher than other restaurants. The company maintained two dairy facilities (the larger of which was situated in Las Vegas, New Mexico) to ensure a consistent and adequate supply of fresh milk. When dining cars began to appear on trains, AT&SF contracted with the Fred Harvey Company to operate the food service on the diners, and all AT&SF advertising proclaimed "Fred Harvey Meals All the Way".

Harvey's meals were served in sumptuous portions that provided a good value for the traveling public; for instance, pies were cut into fourths, rather than sixths, which was the industry standard at the time. The Harvey Company and AT&SF established a series of signals that allowed the dining room staff to make the necessary preparations to feed an entire train in just thirty minutes. For example, the 'cup code' allowed the waitresses to easily see what drink had been ordered by way of how the cup was placed on the saucer. Harvey Houses served their meals on fine China and Irish linens. Fred Harvey, a fastidious innkeeper, set high standards for efficiency and cleanliness in his establishments, personally inspecting them as often as possible. It was said that nothing escaped his notice, and he was even known to completely overturn a poorly set table. Male customers were required to wear a coat and tie in many of Harvey's dining rooms. The Harvey Houses went on to serve meals to GIs traveling on troop trains during World War II.

This mutually beneficial relationship, characterized as one of the most successful and influential business partnerships in the early American West, endured until 1968, when the Fred Harvey Company was sold to Amfac Inc., now Xanterra Resorts and Parks.

=== Facilities and Grand Canyon tourism ===
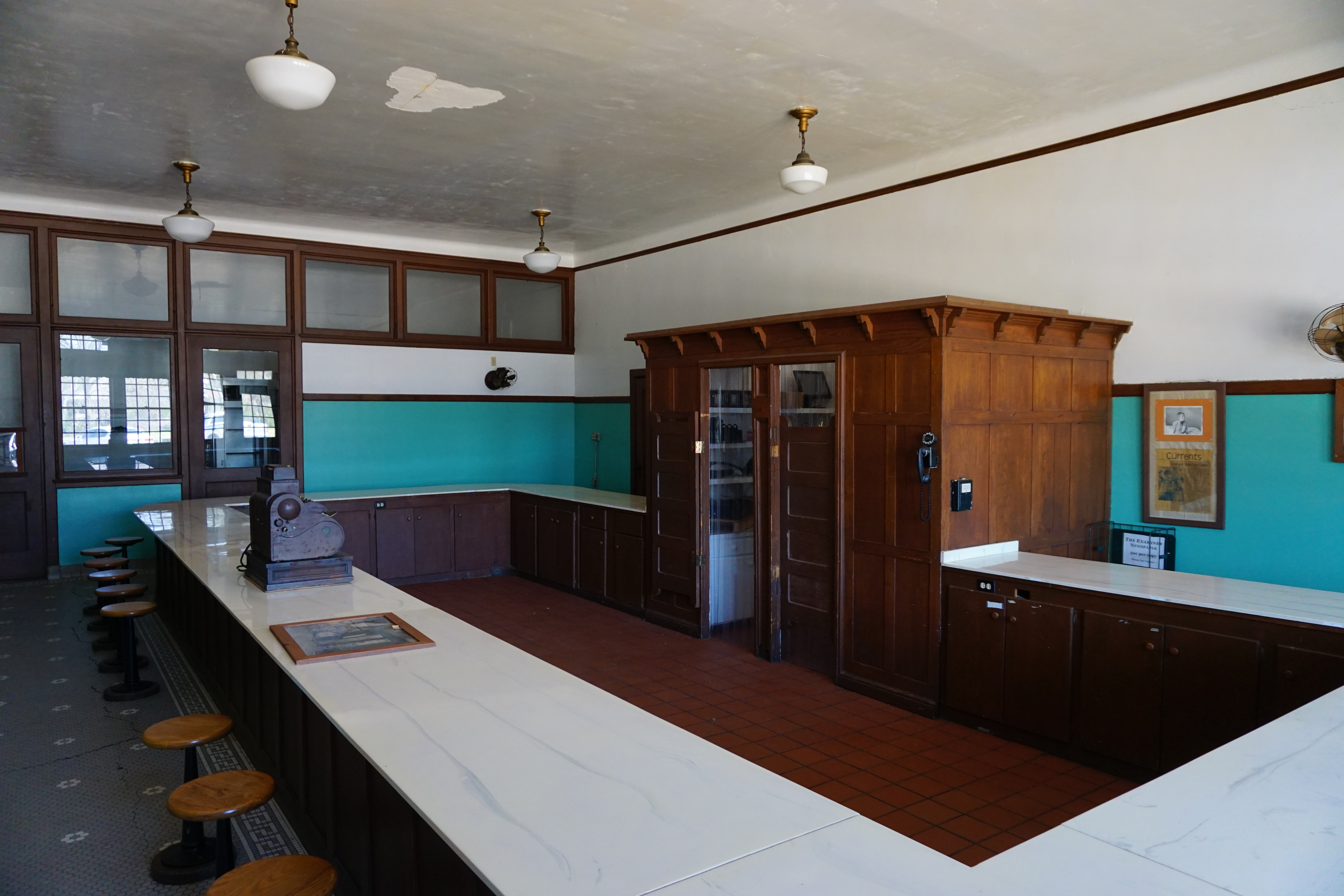
Harvey House Restaurant at the former Frisco Depot in Hugo, Oklahoma

For the Southwest, Harvey hired architects Charles Whittlesey and Louis Curtiss for influential landmark hotels in Santa Fe and Gallup, New Mexico. The Grand Canyon was the Santa Fe railroad's main tourist destination and a major activity of the Harvey Company, especially after it became a national park in 1919. The rugged, landscape-integrated, and culturally appropriate design principles there influenced a generation of subsequent Western U.S. architecture through the National Park Service and Civilian Conservation Corps structures built during the Great Depression and after. Mary Colter, architect for the company from 1904 to 1949, in particular sought to incorporate her designs into the natural splendor of the Canyon, drawing on its beauty. Colter focused on authenticity. Hopi House and Bright Angel Lodge, both on the south rim of the Grand Canyon, are prime examples of her work, which influenced popular interpretations of “the desert” and indigenous America. Bright Angel Lodge was completed in 1935, during the Great Depression.

The Harvey team, with the backing of the Santa Fe railroad, created an entire set of cultural images based on the region's distinctive, and often overlooked, artistic traditions of the Native American residents and the early Spanish settlers in the area. Especially noteworthy were the buildings on the South Rim of the Grand Canyon, including lodges, souvenirs shops, and special lookout points, today on the National Register of Historic Places.

It has been suggested that the Harvey Houses originated the "blue-plate special", a daily low-priced complete meal served on a blue-patterned china plate; an 1892 Harvey menu mentions them, some thirty years before the term became widespread. In addition to the AT&SF, the Harvey Company operated dining facilities for the Gulf Coast & Santa Fe, Kansas Pacific, St. Louis-San Francisco, and the Terminal Railroad Association of St. Louis railways.

AT&SF maintained and operated a fleet of three passenger ferry boats that connected the railroad with San Francisco by water. Ships traveled the eight miles between the San Francisco Ferry Terminal and the railroad's Point Richmond terminal across the Bay. The service was originally established as a continuation of the company's named passenger train runs such as the Angel and the Saint. The larger two ships, the San Pablo and the San Pedro, each featured a newsstand-lunch counter located on the main deck, and a dining room on the upper deck. Meals, sandwiches, sweet rolls, pastries, and coffee were served. AT&SF discontinued ferry service in 1933 due to the effects of the Great Depression.

=== Harvey Girls ===
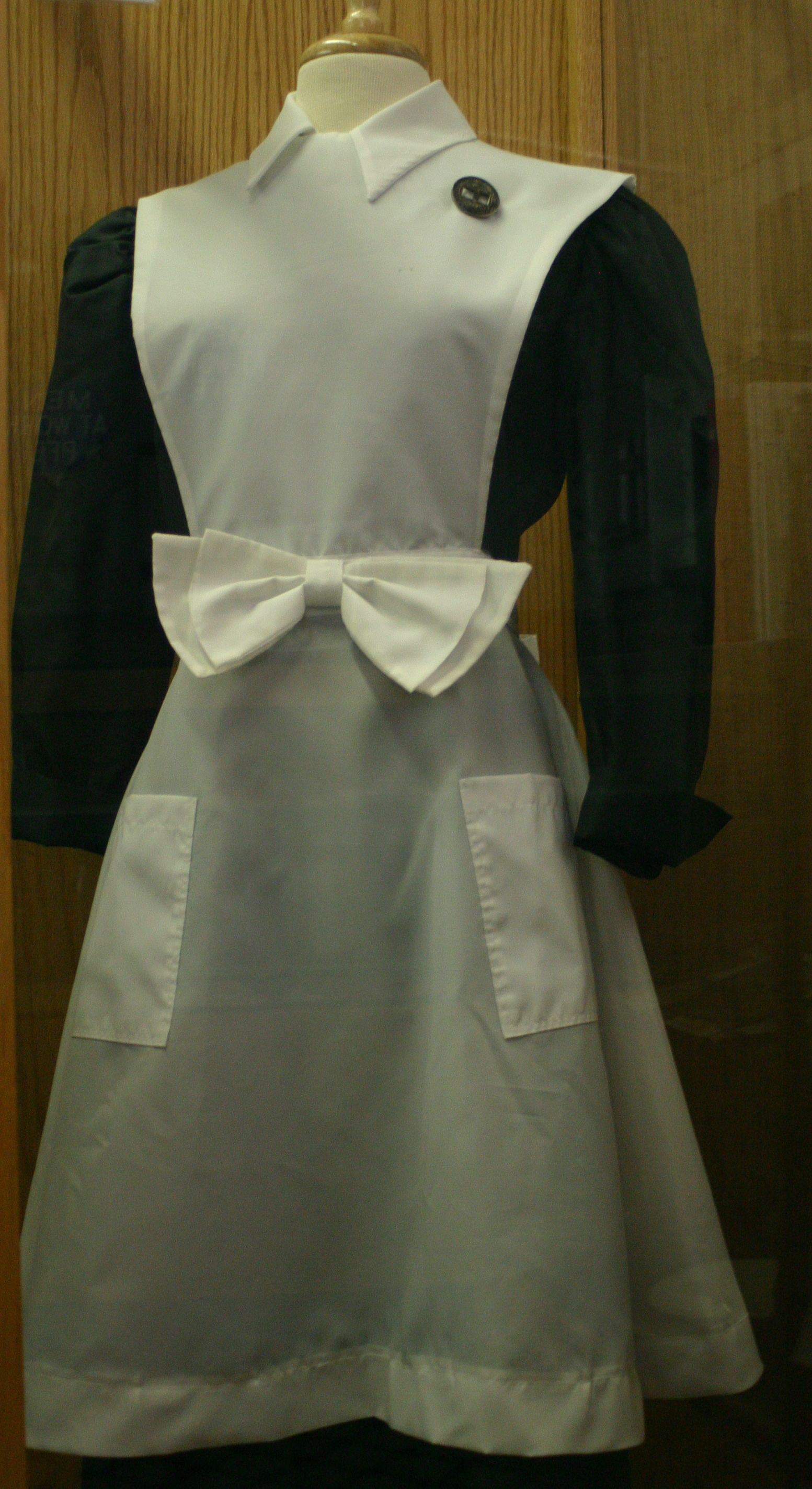
A preserved "Harvey Girl" uniform

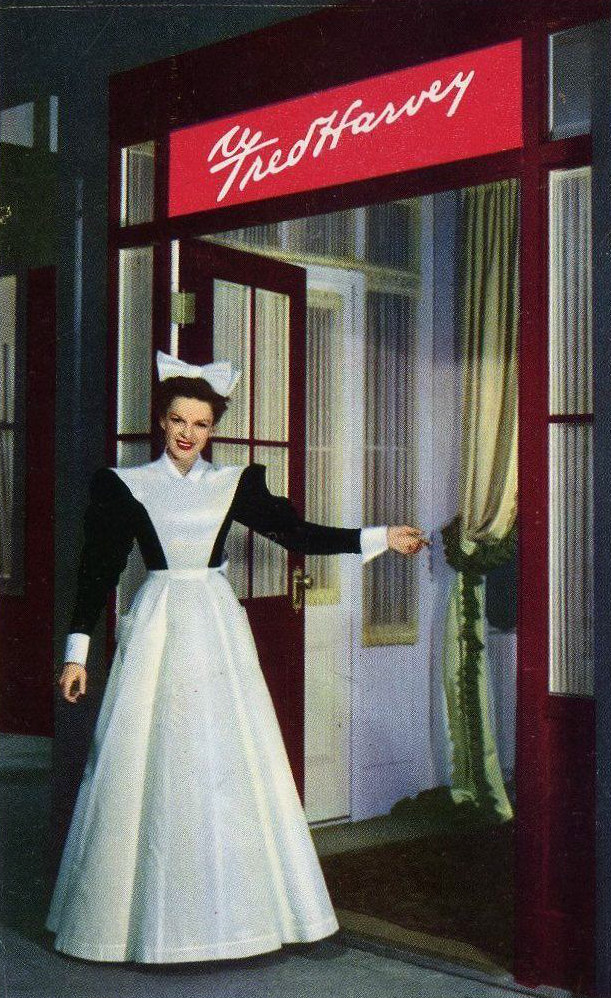
Judy Garland in a scene from The Harvey Girls.

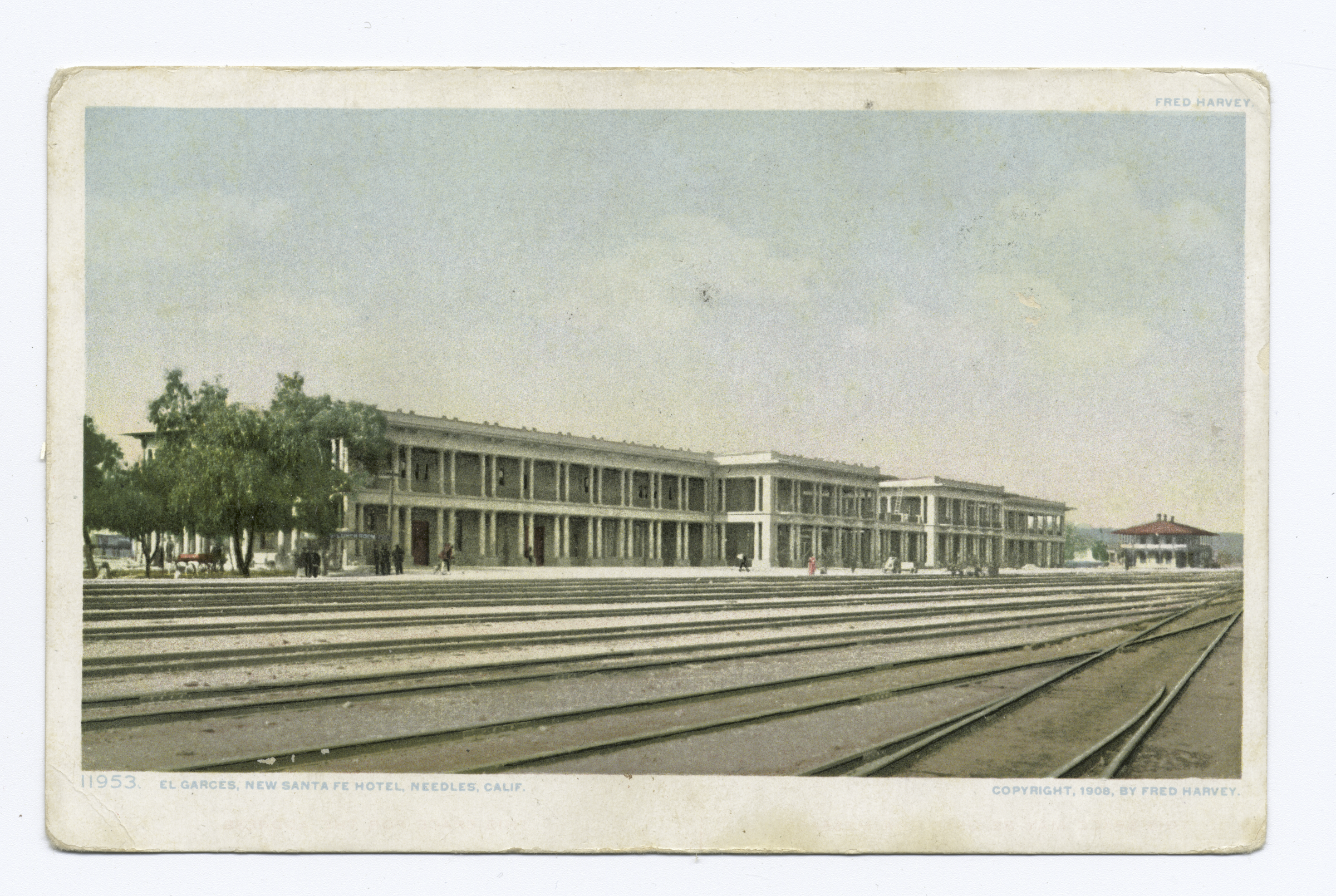
Postcard view of the newly built El Garces hotel and restaurant in Needles, California. Opened in 1908, it was named after Padre Francisco Garcés, a noted Franciscan Spanish priest.

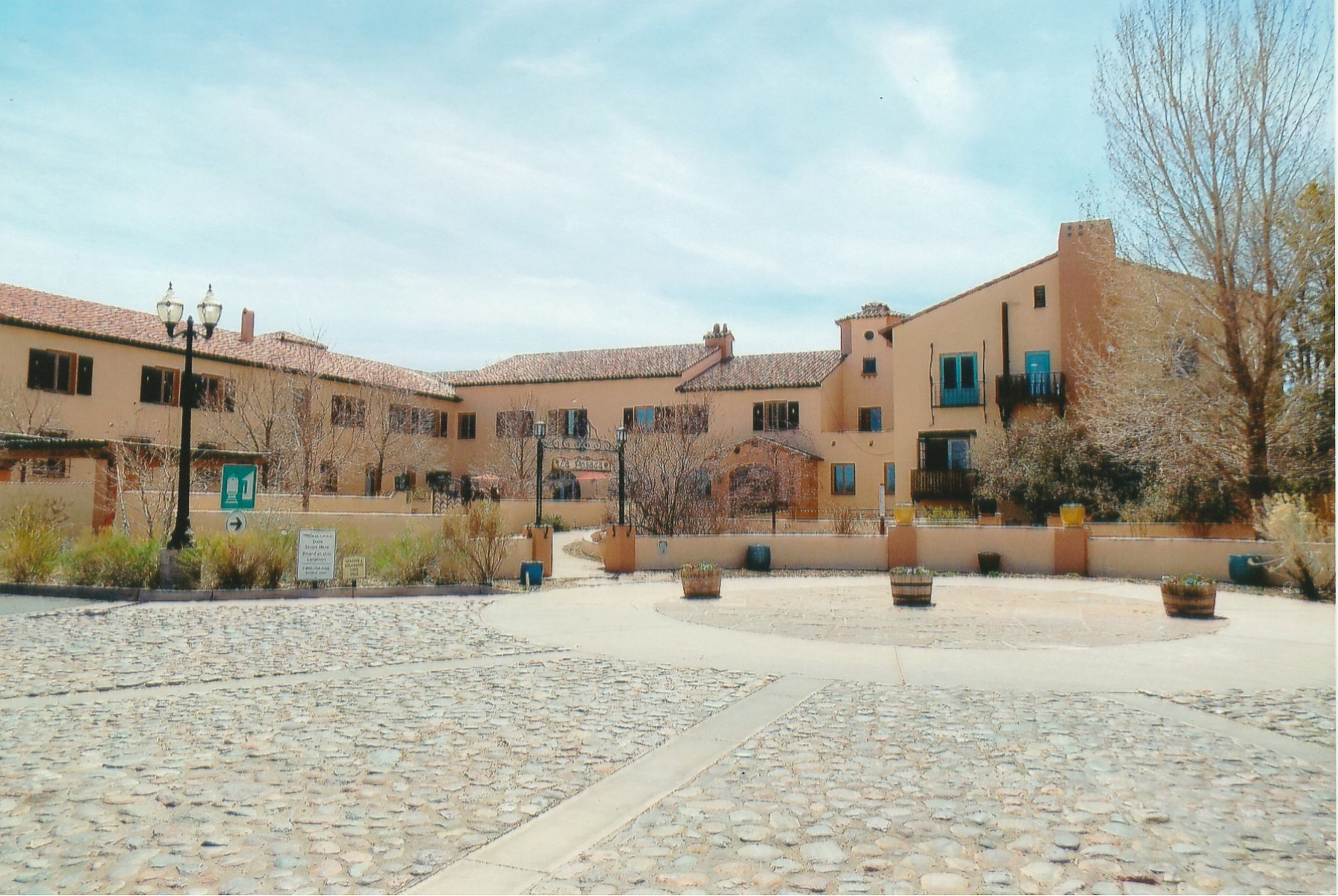
The La Posada Hotel, built in 1929 and opened in 1930, in Winslow, Arizona.

In 1883, Harvey implemented a policy of employing a female serving staff. He sought single, well-mannered, and educated American ladies, and placed ads in newspapers throughout the East Coast and Midwest for "white, young women, 18–30 years of age, of good character, attractive and intelligent". The girls were paid $18.50 a month (equivalent to $639 in 2025), plus room and board, a generous income by the standards of the time.

The women were subjected to a strict 10 p.m. curfew, administered by a senior Harvey Girl who assumed the role and responsibilities of house mother. The official starched black and white uniform (which was designed to diminish the female physique) consisted of a skirt that hung no more than eight inches off the floor, "Elsie" collars, opaque black stockings, and black shoes. The hair was restrained in a net and tied with a regulation white ribbon. Makeup of any sort was absolutely prohibited, as was chewing gum while on duty. Harvey Girls (as they soon came to be known) were required to enter into a six-month employment contract, and forfeited half their base pay should they fail to complete the term of service. Marriage was the most common reason for a girl to terminate her employment.

The restrictions maintained the clean-cut reputation of the Harvey Girls, and made them even more marriageable. Cowboy philosopher Will Rogers once said, “In the early days the traveler fed on the buffalo. For doing so, the buffalo got his picture on the nickel. Well, Fred Harvey should have his picture on one side of the dime, and one of his waitresses with her arms full of delicious ham and eggs on the other side, ‘cause they have kept the West supplied with food and wives.” However, just the opportunity to leave their homes, enjoy travel, have new experiences, and work outside the home was very liberating for thousands of young women.

So significant was the impact of the Harvey Houses and Harvey Girls that their female employees are said to have helped to "civilize the American Southwest". This legend found expression in The Harvey Girls, a 1942 novel by Samuel Hopkins Adams and in the 1946 MGM musical film of the same name which was inspired by it, starring Judy Garland.

=== Dining car service ===
Harvey initially balked at the suggestion that in-transit dining facilities be added to all AT&SF trains operating west of Kansas City. Eventually, Harvey agreed to support the railroad in this endeavor, and the California Limited became the first AT&SF's name trains to feature Harvey Company meal service en route. Later trains, such as the Super Chief, included dining cars (staffed by Fred Harvey Company personnel) as part of the standard passenger car complement right from the outset. Mary Colter specially designed a china pattern, Mimbreno, for the Super Chief's dining cars.

=== Separation from AT&SF ===
Beginning in the 1930s, the Fred Harvey Company began expanding into new locations. Restaurants were opened in such locations as the Chicago Union Station (the largest facility operated by Harvey), San Diego Union Station, the San Francisco Bus Terminal, and the Albuquerque International Airport. The last of these was established at the Los Angeles Union Passenger Terminal in 1939, and could accommodate nearly 300 diners.

From 1959 until 1975, the Fred Harvey organization operated a series of restaurants in the Illinois Tollway oasis, a set of highway rest stops built on bridges over the tollway. In 1954, the Harvey family purchased the Grand Canyon hotels from the AT&SF, thus ensuring that the Fred Harvey Company would continue to operate. In 1966, Fred Harvey purchased the Furnace Creek Inn, near Death Valley National Park, from U.S. Borax in 1966 after operating it for a decade. The original Fred Harvey Company, as well as the company's close affiliation with AT&SF, lasted until 1968 when it was purchased by the Amfac Corporation of Hawaii. Amfac was renamed Xanterra Parks & Resorts in 2002. In 2006, Xanterra purchased the Grand Canyon Railway and its properties.

=== Under Amfac ===
In 1968, Amfac bought Fred Harvey Co. As of the 1970s, Fred Harvey as a division of Amfac ran:

- The Airport Marina Hotel at Manchester and Lincoln in Westchester, Los Angeles, near Los Angeles International Airport
- The Furnace Creek Inn and Ranch in Death Valley (now the Inn at Death Valley)
- Food and beverage and in-flight dining services at Ontario Airport

== Select Harvey hotels and facilities ==
A list of some of the 84 Fred Harvey facilities, in alphabetical order:

A

- Airport Marina Hotel in Westchester, Los Angeles near Los Angeles International Airport (operated by Fred Harvey Co. while a division of Amfac)
- The Alvarado – Albuquerque, New Mexico; closed in 1970, demolished

B

- Belen Harvey House – Belen, New Mexico; closed in 1939, now a Harvey House Museum
- The Bisonte – Hutchinson, Kansas; closed in 1946

C

- The Casa del Desierto – Barstow, California; closed in 1959, refurbished 1999, operating as two museums and city offices
- The Castañeda – Las Vegas, New Mexico; closed in 1948, used in the 1984 film Red Dawn, restored, and reopened in 2019
- Las Chavez – Vaughn, New Mexico; closed in 1936

E

- The Escalante – Ash Fork, Arizona; closed in 1948, demolished in the 1970s

F

- La Fonda – Santa Fe, New Mexico; acquired by the Santa Fe Railway, leased to Fred Harvey in 1925; in operation, different owners
- The Fray Marcos – Williams, Arizona; the site is now The Grand Canyon Railway Hotel, designed to resemble the century-old depot that housed the original Fray Marcos

G

- El Garces – Needles, California; closed in 1958, restored in 2014

H

- Harvey House – Union Station, Los Angeles; designed by Mary Colter, built in 1939, closed in 1967, restored by Cedd Moses' 2013 Hospitality Group and reopened as the Imperial Western Beer Company and Streamliner Bar in 2018
- Harvey House Museum – Florence, Kansas; built in 1876, now a Harvey House Museum
- The Havasu House – Seligman, Arizona; closed in 1955, demolished 2008

N

- El Navajo – Gallup, New Mexico; closed and demolished 1957. This building, designed by Mary Colter as a tribute to Native Americans, became a parking lot.

O

- The Furnace Creek Inn and Ranch in Death Valley (now the Inn at Death Valley)
- El Ortiz – Lamy, New Mexico; closed in 1938
- El Otero – La Junta, Colorado; closed in 1948

P

- La Posada – Winslow, Arizona; closed in 1957; restored and reopened as a historic hotel

S

- The Montezuma Hotel in Montezuma, New Mexico, opened in 1882 and closed in 1903, now the home of United World College, USA.
- The Sequoyah – Syracuse, Kansas; closed in 1936
- The Slaton Harvey House – Slaton, Texas; opened in 1912, restaurant closed in 1942, remained train depot before closing, went into disrepair and was to be demolished, was saved by a few locals, renovated, and reopened – currently operates as an event center and bed & breakfast

T

- El Tovar – Grand Canyon, Arizona; still in operation. El Tovar's design, done by Charles Whittlesey, an architect for the AT&SF, was done in Santa Fe-style, and has been compared to an interior lodge. Opened in 1905, the hotel is right on the edge of the Grand Canyon.

V

- El Vaquero – Dodge City, Kansas; closed in 1948

== See also ==
- Atchison, Topeka and Santa Fe Railway and its passenger train service
- Van Noy Railway News and Hotel Company
