= Airport Marina Hotel =

Hotel in California, United States

Coordinates: 33.95965°N 118.42030°W

- Interactive map of the Airport Marina Hotel area

General information
- Location: 8601 Lincoln Boulevard
- Completed: December 1962
- Opened: January 1963

Design and construction
- Architect: Welton Becket

The Airport Marina Hotel was an 800-room, first-class hotel located at the 8601 Lincoln Boulevard at the southwest corner of Manchester Avenue, in Westchester, Los Angeles, near Los Angeles International Airport.

Its architect was Welton Becket; it was completed in December 1962 and opened in January 1963. At opening it had a shopping center with Joseph Magnin, a specialty department store, pharmacy, drugstore, bank and a 32-lane bowling alley.

== Acquisition ==
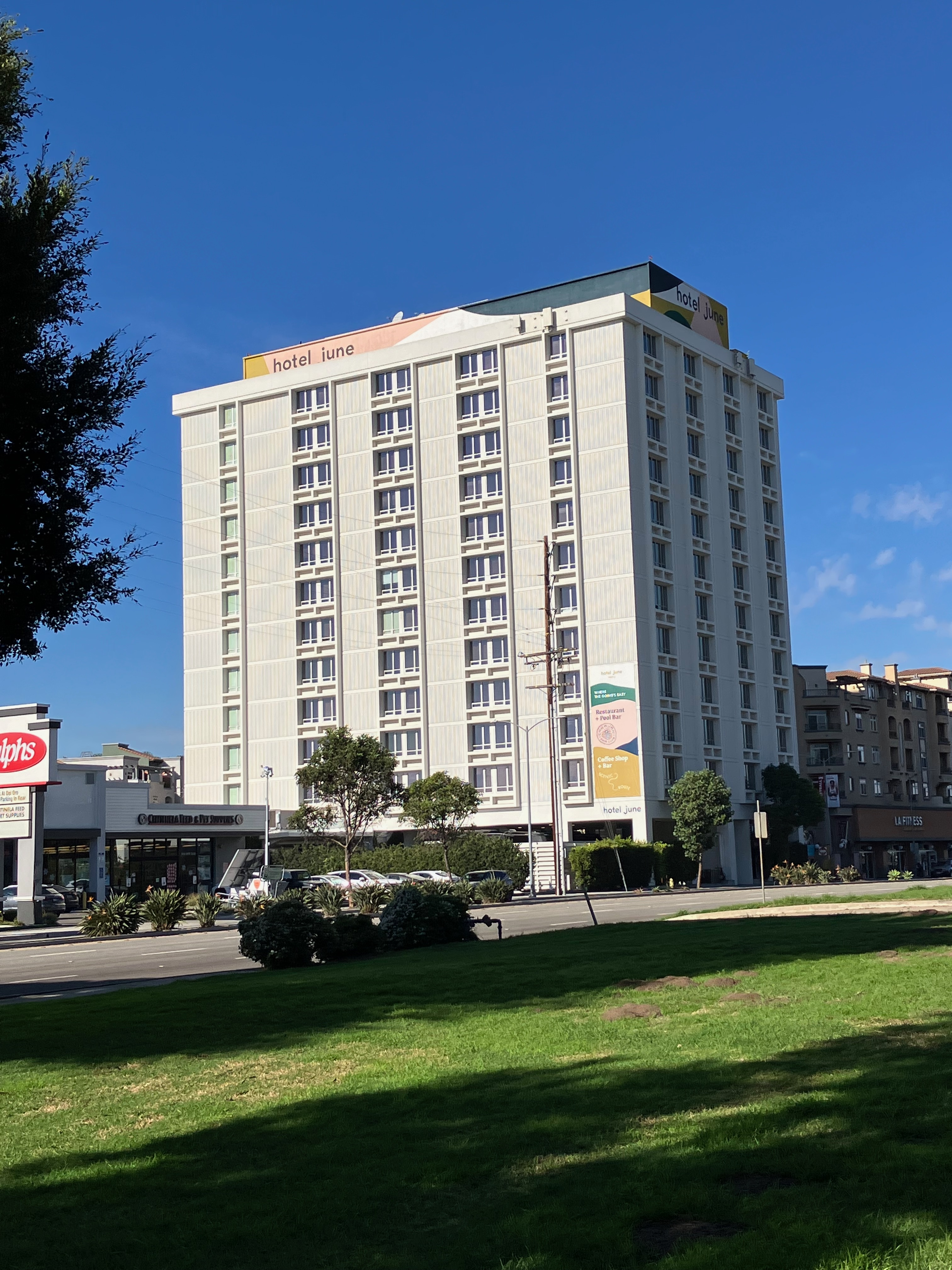
Hotel June, in December 2024

Hawaii-based Amfac bought the hotel (which by then had grown to 800 rooms) and shopping center leasehold in 1968 for $3.7 million and a share of future profits. Amfac started operating them in January 1969 under their Fred Harvey division.

The hotel was later known as the Furama Hotel, then (as of 2016) Custom Hotel. The grounds are now the site of the Playa de Oro apartment complex (with ground floor retail), while the tower - located at 8639 Lincoln Blvd. - continues operating as a boutique hotel, the Hotel June.
