= Amfac =

US real estate company

Amfac, Inc.
- Trade name: Kaanapali Land, LLC
- Type: Public company
- Traded as: (OTCID Basic: KANP)
- Industry: Land development
- Founded: 1898 as H. Hackfeld & Co.
- Headquarters: Hawaii
- Website: kaanapaliland.com

Amfac, Inc., formerly known as American Factors and originally H. Hackfeld & Co., was a land development company in Hawaii. Founded in 1898 as a retail and sugar business, it was considered one of the so-called Big Five companies in the Territory of Hawaii. At its peak, it owned 60,000 acres (24,000 ha) of land, was a dominant sugar company in Hawaii, and was the founder of one of its best known department store chains, Liberty House. It ended with the completion of a bankruptcy proceeding in 2005, with a small successor company, Kaanapali Land, LLC (OTCID Basic: KANP), owning 5,000 acres (2,000 ha) of land in Kaanapali on the island of Maui.

== History ==
In 1849, German immigrant Heinrich Hackfeld formed a dry goods store called Hackfeld's Dry Goods in Honolulu. Hackfeld later became the business agent for Kōloa Plantation on the island of Kauaʻi. Paul Isenberg became a partner in 1881. In 1898, the Hackfeld and Isenberg family interests in Hawaii were officially reorganized as H. Hackfeld & Co.

During World War I, H. Hackfeld & Co. was seized by the U.S. government Alien Property Custodian. It was later sold to a consortium of Hawaii businessmen in 1918, who changed the name to "American Factors". In 1966, the name was further shortened to "Amfac". Henry Alexander Walker became president in 1933. The family estate in Nuʻuanu Valley, known as the H. Alexander Walker Residence, was developed into a showcase orchid garden.

From 1968 to 1972, under president Henry Alexander Walker Jr., Amfac acquired 42 companies. These included the Fred Harvey Company, which had grown to fame operating Harvey House restaurants along railroad lines starting in 1876. Expanding its holdings on Kaua'i, in 1975 Amfac acquired the Kekaha Sugar Company.

Gulf+Western Industries owned a 25% stake in the company, which was sold in 1983.

=== California businesses in the 1970s ===
As of the 1970s, Amfac ran a variety of hospitality, retail, financial and other businesses in California, among other states. California was its second state after Hawaii. It operated:

- 13 Joseph Magnin specialty department stores across Southern California.
- The restaurants at the Los Angeles Music Center.
- The Airport Marina Hotel, operated by Fred Harvey.
- Fred Harvey's Furnace Creek Inn and Ranch in Death Valley (now the Inn at Death Valley).
- The Victor Hugo Inn in Laguna Beach.
- The Tejon Ranch House in Lebec.
- The Ranch House Inn in Valencia.
- Fred Harvey-operated food and beverage and in-flight dining services at Ontario Airport and Palm Springs International Airport.
- Amfac Mortgage, providing real estate financing services from six offices.
- Amfac Properties and Amfac Communities, offering real estate development and management services including Canyon Sands in Palm Springs, California.
- Amfac Drug Supply, distributing pharmaceuticals to hospitals and pharmacies from six branches.
- Amfac Electric Supply, distributing materials to contractors and builders from a dozen branches.

=== 1980s–2000s ===
In 1987, Ronald Sloan was removed as chief executive and president and was replaced by Richard Griffith (Henry Walker Jr. was still chairman of the board). The company announced it was selling its non-Hawaii business units. Amfac was bought by Chicago-based JMB Realty in 1988 for $920 million.

As the sugar industry in Hawaii declined after statehood, so did the fortunes of Amfac. The company's assets were gradually sold off or closed. Oahu Sugar in Waipahu was closed in 1995. Liberty House went into bankruptcy in 1998 (it was later acquired by Federated Department Stores and now carries the Macy's brand name). The Pioneer Mill in Lahaina closed in 1999, and the Kekaha Sugar Mill and Lihue Plantation closed in 2000. West Maui Land acquired the former Pioneer Mill fields above Launiupoko Beach Park. Steve Case acquired the Lihue plantation in 2001. Amfac Hawaii went into Chapter 11 bankruptcy in 2002. Amfac Parks & Resorts was retained by JMB and was renamed Xanterra Parks & Resorts. Amfac Hawaii was reorganized as Kaanapali Land, LLC and the bankruptcy closed in 2005. Some of the former plantation land uphill from the resort has been subdivided into a development called Kāʻanapali Coffee Farms.

== See also ==
- History of sugar
- Sugar plantations in Hawaii
