= The Harvey Girls =

1946 film by George Sidney

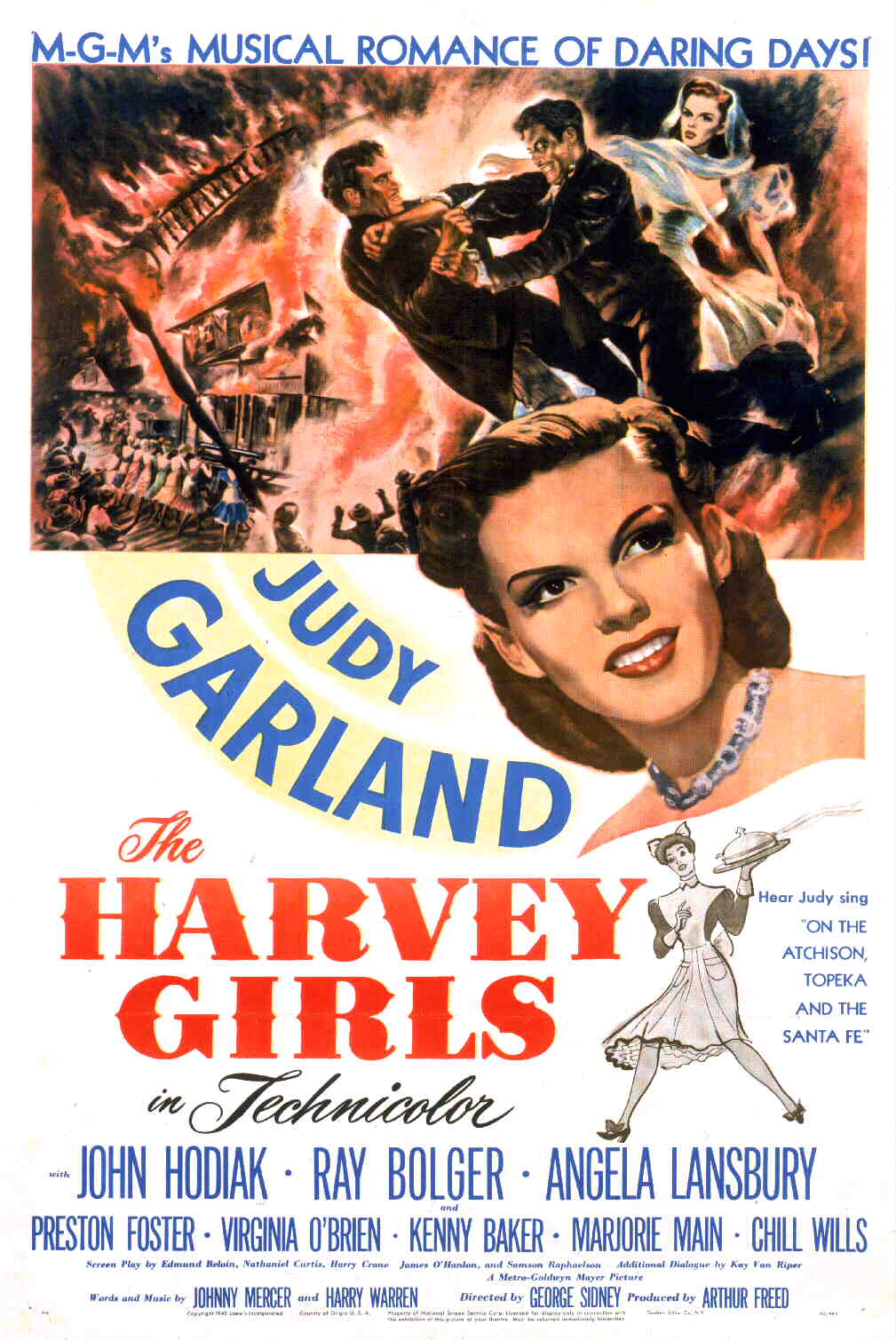
- Theatrical release poster
- Directed by: George Sidney
- Screenplay by: Edmund Beloin; Nathaniel Curtis; Harry Crane; James O'Hanlon; Samson Raphaelson; Kay Van Riper (additional dialogue)
- Story by: Eleanore Griffin; William Rankin
- Based on: The Harvey Girls by Samuel Hopkins Adams
- Produced by: Arthur Freed
- Starring: Judy Garland; John Hodiak; Ray Bolger; Angela Lansbury; Preston Foster; Virginia O'Brien; Kenny Baker; Marjorie Main; Chill Wills
- Cinematography: George Folsey
- Edited by: Albert Akst
- Music by: Johnny Mercer; Harry Warren; Lennie Hayton (musical direction)
- Production company: Metro-Goldwyn-Mayer
- Distributed by: Loew's Inc.
- Release date: January 18, 1946
- Running time: 102 minutes
- Country: United States
- Language: English
- Budget: $2,931,000
- Box office: $5,175,000

The Harvey Girls is a 1946 American musical romantic comedy film directed by George Sidney and produced by Arthur Freed for Metro-Goldwyn-Mayer. It is based on the 1942 novel by Samuel Hopkins Adams, about Fred Harvey's Harvey House waitresses. The film stars Judy Garland and features John Hodiak, Ray Bolger, and Angela Lansbury, as well as Preston Foster, Virginia O'Brien, Kenny Baker, Marjorie Main and Chill Wills. Future star Cyd Charisse appears in her first speaking role on film.

The Harvey Girls won an Academy Award for Best Original Song for "On the Atchison, Topeka and the Santa Fe", written by Harry Warren and Johnny Mercer.

== Plot ==
In the 1890s, a group of "Harvey Girls"—new waitresses for Fred Harvey's pioneering chain of Harvey House restaurants—travels on the Atchison, Topeka and Santa Fe Railway to the town of Sandrock, New Mexico. On the trip, they meet Susan Bradley, who is traveling from Ohio to Sandrock to marry a man named H. H. Hartsey, whose beautiful love letters she received when she answered a "lonely-hearts" ad.

Upon arrival, Susan is dismayed to find that Hartsey is a "mangy old buzzard" who does not at all meet her expectations. As Hartsey senses Susan's disappointment, the two eventually agree that they are mismatched and call off the wedding. Hartsey then reveals to Susan that his letters were actually written as a joke by Ned Trent, co-owner of the Alhambra Saloon, prompting Susan to confront Ned. Smitten with Susan, Ned offers to pay for her trip back to Ohio, but she instead vows to run him and his saloon out of town.

Susan joins the Harvey Girls, and on the Harvey House's opening night, Ned visits the restaurant and orders a rare steak. Realizing that the meat has disappeared, Susan marches over to the Alhambra with two six-shooters, recovers the stolen meat and serves Ned a raw steak. Later that night, after someone shoots at a lamp in the Harvey Girls' dormitory, most of the women want to flee, but Susan and other waitresses decide to stay, unaware that Ned's business associate, Judge Sam Purvis, is determined to close the Harvey House in order to maintain his own thriving business running the Alhambra in town.

The next day, Ned confronts Purvis about the shooting and demands that he apologize to the Harvey Girls. Instead, Purvis lies to Susan and another waitress, Deborah Andrews, claiming that Ned is not pleased to have the Harvey House in town. Determined to find the culprit behind the shooting, Susan seeks out Ned at the Alhambra and is confronted by Em, Ned's lead saloon singer who is in love with him; she reveals to Susan that it is actually Purvis, not Ned, who wants to run the Harvey House out of town.

Susan finds Ned alone in a remote valley, and as they discuss love letters and Henry Wadsworth Longfellow's poem The Courtship of Miles Standish, they kiss. Returning to town, they find Deborah trapped in the Harvey Girls' closet with a rattlesnake, which Ned shoots dead. Susan accuses Ned of placing the snake in their closet, prompting him to leave. Ned then tells Purvis to stop harassing the Harvey Girls. Some time later, Ned informs Susan that the Alhambra will be relocated to Flagstaff, Arizona, the next morning, and she cries as they say goodbye.

Later that night, when Purvis and his henchmen set fire to the Harvey House, Ned fights them off, but the restaurant burns down. The next morning, Ned offers the Alhambra as a replacement for the Harvey House. Just before Em boards the train to Flagstaff, Ned tells her he is staying in Sandrock. Susan, thinking that Ned too is leaving, boards the same train and is spotted by Em. Realizing that Susan loves Ned so much that she is willing to become a saloon girl to be with him, Em pulls the emergency brake and points out Ned, riding toward the train on his horse. Ultimately, they wed in the desert, surrounded by the Harvey Girls.

== Cast ==
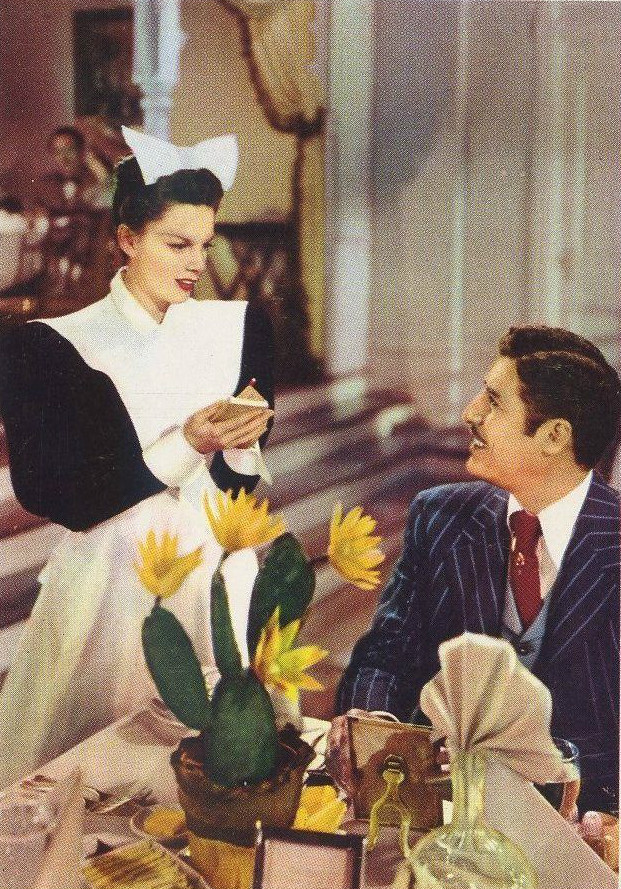
Judy Garland and John Hodiak in The Harvey Girls

- Judy Garland as Susan Bradley
- John Hodiak as Ned Trent
- Ray Bolger as Chris Maule
- Angela Lansbury as Em
  - Virginia Rees as the singing voice for Lansbury
- Preston Foster as Judge Sam Purvis
- Virginia O'Brien as Alma
- Kenny Baker as Terry O'Halloran
- Marjorie Main as Sonora Cassidy
- Chill Wills as H. H. Hartsey
- Selena Royle as Miss Bliss
- Cyd Charisse as Deborah
  - Marion Doenges as the singing voice for Charisse
- Ruth Brady as Ethel
- Jack Lambert as Marty Peters
- Edward Earle as Jed Adams
- Morris Ankrum as Rev. Claggett
- Wm. "Bill" Phillips as 1st cowboy
- Ben Carter as John Henry
- Norman Leavitt as 2nd cowboy
- Horace McNally as "Goldust" McClean
- Mary Moder as a special performer (uncredited)
- Dorothy Tuttle as a Harvey Girl (uncredited)

Cast notes:

- Byron Harvey Jr., the grandson of Fred Harvey of the Fred Harvey Company, has an uncredited role as a train conductor.
- The Harvey Girls was the next reunion on film of Ray Bolger with Judy Garland after The Wizard of Oz (1939).

== Production ==
The Harvey Girls was conceived by MGM as a dramatic western vehicle for Lana Turner, but Roger Edens, of the Arthur Freed unit, decided after seeing the musical Oklahoma! that the story should be reworked as MGM's western musical with Judy Garland as its star. Garland wanted to work with Fred Astaire on Yolanda and the Thief, which was directed by fiancé Vincente Minnelli. Edens convinced her that the part in Yolanda was not large enough for her, and he promised that The Harvey Girls would be specifically created to showcase her talents.

Principal photography on The Harvey Girls lasted from January 12 through June 4, 1945, a long production period. Studio filming was at MGM's Culver City studios, and the locations were in Victorville, California; at the Iverson Movie Ranch in Chatsworth (near Los Angeles); and in Monument Valley. Angela Lansbury had a soprano voice, but MGM wanted her character Em the saloon girl to have a deeper and huskier voice, so the singer Virginia Reess dubbed Angela Lansbury's songs. Angela did sing with her own voice in two MGM films: The Picture of Dorian Gray and Till the Clouds Roll By. Cyd Charisse, in her first speaking role in the film, had her singing dubbed by Marion Doenges.

Virginia O'Brien, a comic actress known for her deadpan style of singing, was pregnant while The Harvey Girls was filmed. Several scenes with Ray Bolger were never filmed due to the difficulty in hiding her pregnancy. This accounts for O'Brien's character disappearing after she sings "Wild Wild West".

The Harvey Girls was released in the United States on January 18, 1946.

Production credits:

- Art direction – William Ferrari and Cedric Gibbons
- Set decoration – Mildred Griffiths and Edwin B. Willis
- Costume design – Irene Gibbons, Helen Rose, Valles
- Makeup artist – Dorothy Ponedel
- Production manager – Dave Friedman
- Assistant director – George Rhein
- Sound director – Douglas Shearer
- Special effects – Warren Newcombe
- Choreographer – Robert Alton
- Musical director – Lennie Hayton
- Orchestrator – Conrad Salinger

== Songs ==
The songs in The Harvey Girls were all written by Harry Warren (music) and Johnny Mercer (lyrics):

- "In the Valley (Where the Evening Sun Goes Down)" – Judy Garland
- "Wait and See" – Angela Lansbury (voice: Virginia Rees)
- "On the Atchison, Topeka and the Santa Fe" – Ben Carter, Marjorie Main, Ray Bolger, Judy Garland and chorus
- "The Train Must Be Fed" – Edward Earle, Selena Royle, Marjorie Main, Judy Garland and chorus
- "Oh, You Kid" – Angela Lansbury (voice: Virginia Rees)
- "Wait and See (reprise) – Kenny Baker
- "It's a Great Big World" – Judy Garland, Virginia O'Brien, Cyd Charisse (voice: Marion Doenges)
- "The Wild, Wild West" – Virginia O'Brien
- "Wait and See (second reprise) – Kenny Baker, Cyd Charisse (voice: Marion Doenges)
- "Swing Your Partner Round and Round" – Ray Bolger, Judy Garland, Marjorie Main, Cyd Charisse and chorus
- "In the Valley (Where the Evening Sun Goes Down) (reprise)" – Kenny Baker, Judy Garland

By far the biggest hit from the score of The Harvey Girls was "On the Atchison, Topeka, and the Santa Fe". MGM released the song to record companies even before shooting was finished on the film, and it became an instant hit dominating the airwaves through the summer and fall of 1945, with versions by Bing Crosby with Six Hits and a Miss, Judy Garland and The Merry Macs, the Tommy Dorsey Orchestra with the Sentimentalists, and, the most popular, Johnny Mercer and The Pied Pipers. Mercer's version entered the Billboard charts on July 5, 1945, and stayed on it for 16 weeks, including seven straight weeks as No. 1 between July 28 and September 8. Crosby's entered the charts on July 19 and stayed ten weeks, going as high as No. 4, while Dorsey's entered on August 2 and stayed for six weeks, peaking at No. 6. Garland's hit the Billboard No. 10 position on September 20. The song was also number 1 on Your Hit Parade for eight weeks running.

In shooting the number for the film, Garland reportedly did the entire song up to the tempo change in one take, twice, after watching her stand-in do one run-through.

=== Deleted songs ===
Cut from the film were three other songs written for it by Warren and Mercer: "March of the Doagies", "Hayride" and "My Intuition". "Doagies" was a production number featuring Garland; the outtake was included in That's Entertainment! III (1994). "My Intuition" was a duet for Garland and John Hodiak; this was also filmed and still survives in video format. "Hayride", sung by Garland and Ray Bolger, was prerecorded but not filmed.

== Reception ==
=== Box office ===
According to MGM records, the film earned $4,112,000 in the United States and Canada and $1,063,000 elsewhere.

=== Critical response ===
Howard Barnes wrote in the New York Herald Tribune that the film was "A great big animated picture postcard. Judy Garland is the film's bright ... star. Miss Garland is effectively glamorized in get-ups of the (18)90's and sings her songs pleasantly. The Harvey Girls is a perfect demonstration of what Hollywood can do with its vast resources when it wants to be really showy ... pretty girls – period sets and costumes – lilting tunes – super-speedy dance shuffles."

The New York Daily News said it was "A nostalgic whiff of the old west. Judy sings several sentimental ballads, as well as On the Atchison, Topeka, and the Santa Fe number. Her chief support in the way of real entertainment comes from Ray Bolger." Time wrote "A technicolored musical celebrating the coming of chastity, clean silverware, and crumbless tablecloths to the pioneer Southwest. The bearers of this culture, according to evidence presented here, were waitresses. The Harvey Girls is good fun in spots. Miss Garland doesn't seem as recklessly happy as she was in St. Louis but she still appears to be having a pretty fine time."

=== Accolades ===
"On the Atchison, Topeka, and the Santa Fe" won an Academy Award for Best Original Song for Harry Warren and Johnny Mercer. In addition, Lennie Hayton's score was nominated for Best Music, Scoring of a Musical Picture, but did not win; the Oscar went to Morris Stoloff for The Jolson Story.
