= The Harvey Girls (novel) =

1942 novel by Samuel Hopkins Adams

- First edition
- Author: Samuel Hopkins Adams
- Language: English
- Subject: Western; love story
- Genre: Fiction
- Publisher: Random House
- Publication date: 1942
- Publication place: United States
- Media type: Print (hardcover)
- Pages: 327 pp (first edition)
- OCLC: 1106136

The Harvey Girls is a novel published in 1942 by Samuel Hopkins Adams. In 1946, it was adapted by MGM into a musical film starring Judy Garland, eponymously titled The Harvey Girls.
