= Chrząszcz =

20th-century poem by Jan Brzechwa, popular as a tongue-twister

Chrząszcz (beetle, chafer) by Jan Brzechwa is a tongue-twister poem famous for being considered one of the hardest-to-pronounce texts in Polish literature. It may cause problems even for adult, native Polish speakers.

The first few lines of the poem:

Polish original	Phonetic transcription	English translation
W Szczebrzeszynie chrząszcz brzmi w trzcinie	[f‿ʂt͡ʂɛ.bʐɛ.ˈʂɨ.ɲɛ xʂɔɰ̃ʂt͡ʂ bʐmi ˈf‿tʂt͡ɕi.ɲɛ]	In Szczebrzeszyn a beetle buzzes in the reeds
I Szczebrzeszyn z tego słynie.	[i ʂt͡ʂɛ.ˈbʐɛ.ʂɨn ˈs‿tɛ.ɡɔ ˈswɨ.ɲɛ ‖]	And Szczebrzeszyn is famous for this.
Wół go pyta: „Panie chrząszczu,	[vuw ɡɔ ˈpɨ.ta | ˈpa.ɲɛ ˈxʂɔɰ̃ʂ.t͡ʂu |]	An ox asks him: "Mister beetle,
Po cóż pan tak brzęczy w gąszczu?"	[pɔ t͡suʂ pan tag‿ˈbʐɛn.t͡ʂɨ ˈv‿ɡɔɰ̃ʂ.t͡ʂu ‖]	What are you buzzing in the bushes for?"

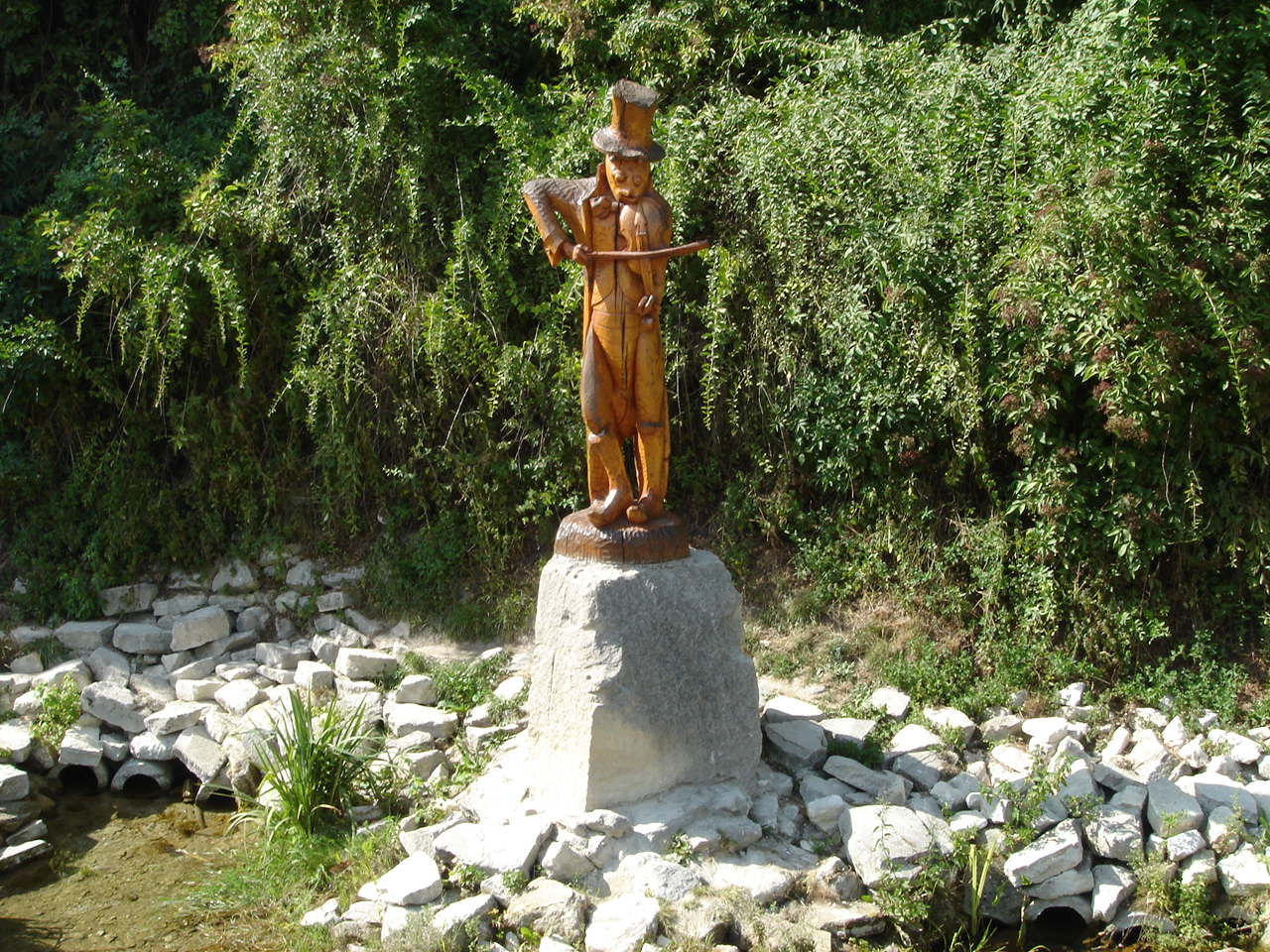
"The Beetle" wooden monument in Szczebrzeszyn dedicated to the poem's main character

The first line "W Szczebrzeszynie chrząszcz brzmi w trzcinie" (In Szczebrzeszyn a beetle buzzes in the reed) is a well-known Polish tongue-twister and dates to at least the 19th century.

Thanks to the poem, the town of Szczebrzeszyn is widely known in Poland. Two monuments to the beetle were erected there, and a yearly sculpture festival has been held there ever since.

Chrząszcz was translated into English by Walter Whipple as Cricket (whose Polish equivalent, świerszcz, is also considered difficult to pronounce for non-Polish speakers).

== See also ==
- Strč prst skrz krk, Czech and Slovak tongue twister and shibboleth
