= How much wood would a woodchuck chuck? =

American English language tongue-twister

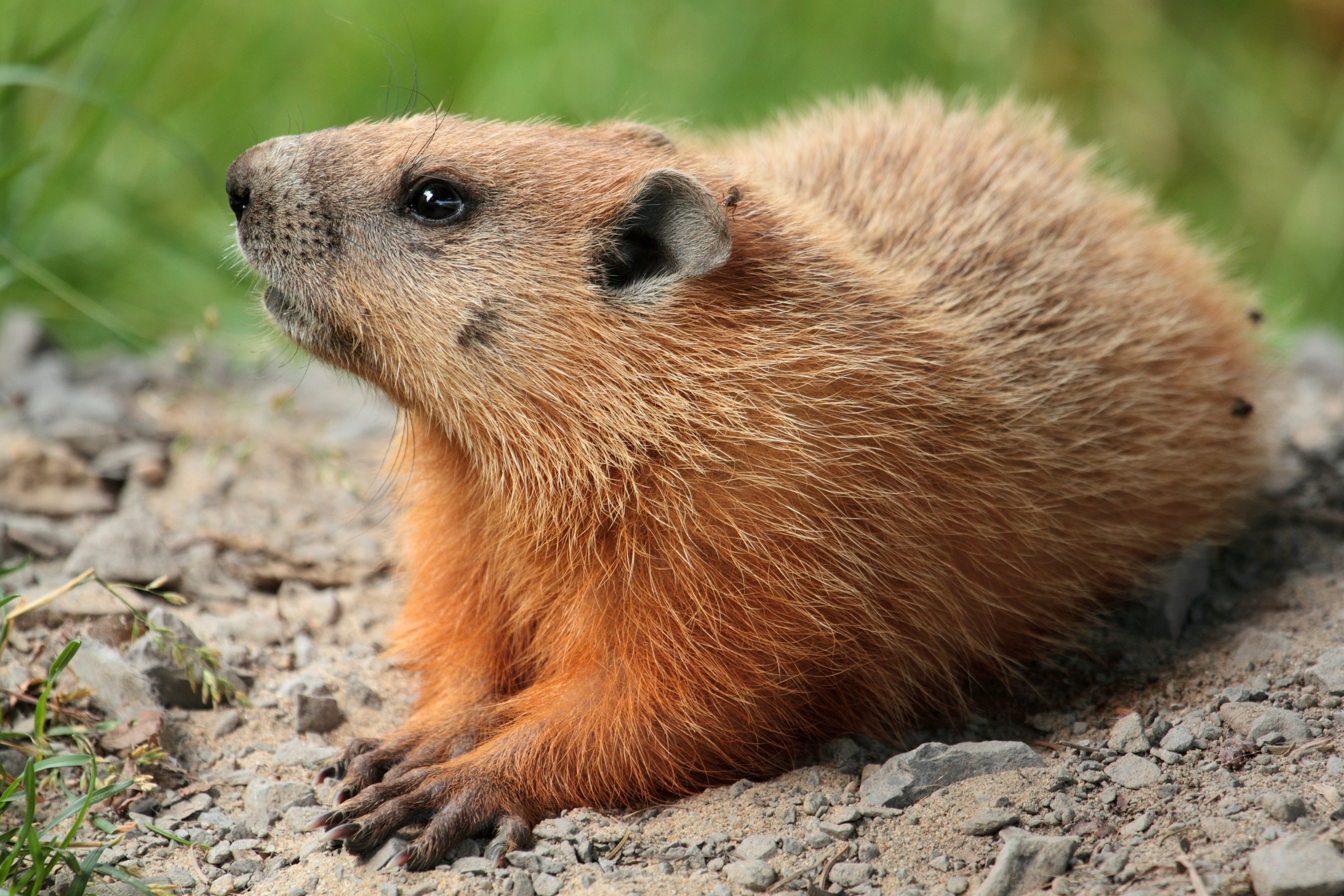
A woodchuck

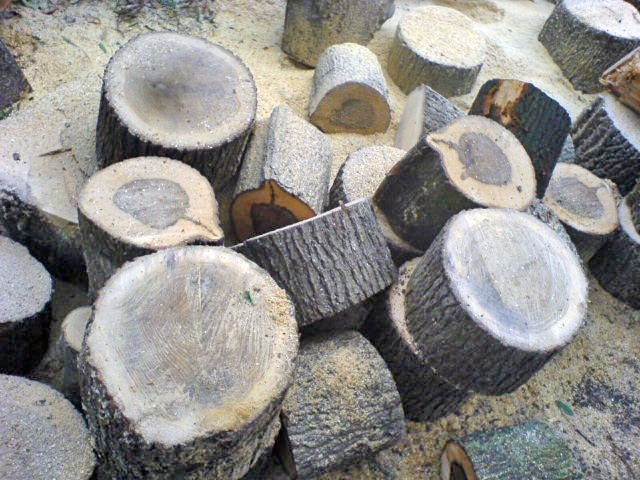
Sawn logs of wood

"How much wood would a woodchuck chuck" (sometimes phrased with "could" rather than "would") is an American English-language tongue-twister. The woodchuck, a word originating from Algonquian "wejack", is a kind of marmot, regionally called a groundhog. The complete beginning of the tongue-twister usually goes: "How much wood would a woodchuck chuck if a woodchuck could chuck wood?" The tongue-twister relies primarily on alliteration to achieve its effects, with five "w" sounds interspersed among five "ch" sounds, as well as 6 "ood" sounds.

== Answers ==
A traditional, if nonsensical, "response" to the question is: "A woodchuck would chuck as much wood as a woodchuck could chuck if a woodchuck could chuck wood". Other—similarly unhelpful—responses include "So much wood would a woodchuck chuck as a woodchuck would if a woodchuck could chuck wood!", "He would chuck, he would, as much as he could, and chuck as much wood as a woodchuck would if a woodchuck could chuck wood.", "He would chuck as much as a woodchuck could if a woodchuck could chuck wood.", and "As much wood as a woodchuck would if a woodchuck could chuck wood!"

A 1957 Associated Press piece refers to the question as "a riddle which beats the Sphinx, since it's still unanswered". A more concrete answer was published by the Associated Press in 1988, which reported that a New York fish and wildlife technician named Richard Thomas had calculated the volume of dirt in a typical 25–30-foot (7.6–9.1 m) long woodchuck burrow and had determined that if the woodchuck had moved an equivalent volume of wood, it could move "about 700 pounds (320 kg) on a good day, with the wind at his back". Another study, which considered "chuck" to be the opposite of upchucking, determined that a woodchuck could ingest 362 cm^{3} (22 cu in) of wood per day.

== Origin ==
The origin of the phrase is from a 1902 song "The Woodchuck Song", written by Robert Hobart Davis for Fay Templeton in the musical The Runaways. The lyrics became better known in a 1904 version of the song written by Theodore Morse, with a chorus of "How much wood would a woodchuck chuck if a woodchuck would chuck wood?", which was recorded by Ragtime Roberts, in 1904.

It is used in the title of Werner Herzog's 1976 film How Much Wood Would a Woodchuck Chuck, a documentation of the World Livestock Auctioneer Championship in New Holland, Pennsylvania.

== Popular culture ==
- The 1992 video-game Monkey Island 2: LeChuck's Revenge features an exchange between protagonist Guybrush Threepwood and Woody the Woodsmith, in which five different takes on this tongue-twister are used as questions and responses.
- Google features this tongue twister as an Easter egg in its search engine, as well as Google Now. Several other virtual assistants, including Siri and Cortana, have their own unique, humorous responses to the phrase.

== See also ==
- Alliteration
- Announcer's test
- Malapropism
- Spoonerism
- Theophilus Thistle
