= Akademia pana Kleksa =

Akademia pana Kleksa may refer to:

- Akademia pana Kleksa (novel), a 1946 book in the Pan Kleks book series by Polish author Jan Brzechwa
- Akademia pana Kleksa (film), a 1983 fantasy film based on the book
- Akademia pana Kleksa (musical), 2007
- Akademia pana Kleksa (film 2023)
