= Podróże pana Kleksa =

1986 fantasy adventure film

- Theatrical release poster
- Directed by: Krzysztof Gradowski
- Starring: Piotr Fronczewski
- Music by: Andrzej Korzyński
- Release date: 1986
- Countries: Poland; Soviet Union
- Language: Polish

Podróże pana Kleksa (lit. 'Travels of Mr. Blot') is a 1986 fantasy adventure film directed by Krzysztof Gradowski. It is the second film based on the Pan Kleks book series by Jan Brzechwa, following Akademia pana Kleksa (1983), and stars Piotr Fronczewski reprising his role as the titular professor, Ambroży Kleks. An international co-production of Poland and the Soviet Union, Podróże pana Kleksa is divided into two parts: Wysłannicy Bajdocji (Emissaries of Bajdocja) and Wyspa Wynalazców (Inventors' Island).

Podróże pana Kleksa was followed by Pan Kleks w kosmosie (1988), also directed by Gradowski and starring Fronczewski.

== Plot ==
Professor Klyaks (Pan Kleks) visits Petrek, a boy in a hospital, and tells him a fantastical story. In the tale, the Great Elektronik and his army of robots conquer the Island of Inventors, enslave its scientists, and order Colonel Bombel, his subordinate, to destroy the ink reserves of the Fairy Tale Kingdom. This sinister plan aims to deprive people of the ability to record their imagination, forcing them to submit to the will of the machines. With the kingdom's storytelling competition under threat, King Apollinary tasks Professor Klyaks with a mission: to travel to distant lands aboard a ship and secure the vital ink supply.

Among the crew are the brave young sailor Petrek and Boniface, an agent of the Great Elektronik, who secretly works to sabotage the mission.

After numerous adventures, Professor Klyaks and his companions triumph over the robots, forcing the Great Elektronik to flee. Klyaks exposes and punishes Boniface by transforming him back into a child "for re-education." Ultimately, the professor discovers an ink deposit right outside King Apollinary's palace.

As the story concludes, Petrek, the bedridden boy, wakes up to find he can walk again.

== Cast ==
- Piotr Fronczewski as Professor Kleks / vocals
- Małgorzata Ostrowska as Sea Queen Aba
- Henryk Bista as The Great Elektronik
- Zbigniew Buczkowski as Colonel Alojzy Bąbel, former assistant to barber Filip
- Georgy Vitsin as Apollinary Bay, King of the Fairy Tale Kingdom (voiced by Mieczysław Czechowicz)
- Irina Gubanova as Queen Banialuka
- Lena Morozova as Princess Rezeda
- Jerzy Bończak as Traitor Bonifacy
- Marcin Barański as Pietrek
- Wiesław Michnikowski as Doctor Pai-Khi-Wo
- Władysław Kowalski as Grossmechanic, President of the Island of Inventors
- Vladimir Fyodorov as Minister of Information (voiced by Mieczysław Gajda)
- Leon Niemczyk as Filip, Robot of the 13th Generation
- Jerzy Kryszak as Master Pill II, Ruler of Apothecaria
- Nikolay Pogodin as Chief of the Palace Guard in the Fairy Tale Kingdom
- Katarzyna Kozak as Girl
- Maria Kwos-Morawska as Lady-in-Waiting
- Michał Anioł as Captain Quaterno
- Piotr Grabowski (born 1947) as Cook Fortelas
- Janusz Rewiński as Boatswain Bank
- Marian Glinka as Barnaba
- Ryszard Dreger as Apothecary Prot
- Bogusz Bilewski as Talens
- Jan Jankowski as Guard
- Mariusz Zabrodzki as vocals
- Edyta Geppert as vocals
- Lech Ordon as vocals
- Mieczysław Czechowicz as vocals

== Release ==
During its theatrical release, Podróże pana Kleksa garnered an estimated 8,678,791 admissions.
