= Memory test =

Memory test may refer to:

- Mental status examination, human memory
- Memory test software, computer memory
- Neuropsychological test, a formal psychological test of human memory
- Announcer's test, a popular repetitive test and tongue-twister

== See also ==
- Memory (disambiguation)
- Test (disambiguation)
