= Piotr Fronczewski =

Polish actor and singer (born 1946)

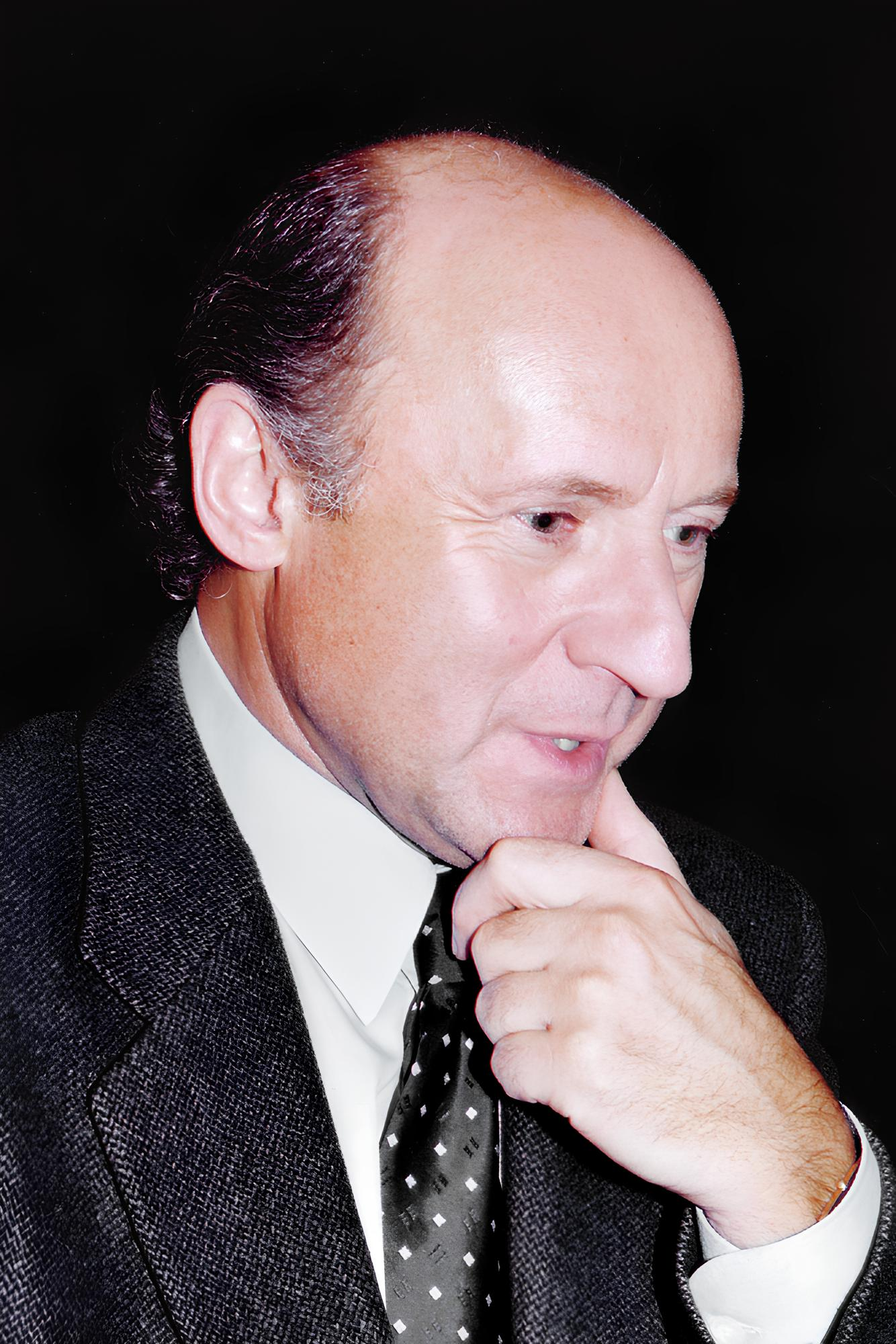
- Born: 8 June 1946 (age 80); Łódź, Poland
- Education: The Aleksander Zelwerowicz National Academy of Dramatic Art in Warsaw
- Occupations: Actor, singer
- Spouse: Ewa Fronczewska
- Children: Katarzyna Fronczewska; Magdalena Fronczewska
- Musical career
- Also known as: Franek Kimono, Crazy Zdzich, Pan Kimono
- Genres: Disco, ballad
- Labels: Arston, Polskie Nagrania Muza, Alcom, Columbia Records, Sony Music Entertainment Poland, Sony BMG Music Entertainment Poland, Vega, Polmark, Polton, Savitor, Brawo, Polskie Radio/Pomaton EMI

Piotr Fronczewski (born 8 June 1946) is a Polish actor and a cabaret and theatre singer. He is regarded as one of the greatest and most popular actors of his generation.

== Life and career ==
He was born in Łódź to a Polish mother, Bogna Duszyńska (1912–2016) and a Polish-Jewish father, Władysław Fronczewski (1900–1969). His father was born as Władysław Finkelstein and changed his last name before the outbreak of World War II. He is a graduate of the Karol Świerczewski Liceum in Warsaw.

Piotr Fronczewski is also known for the fictional character/musical project Franek Kimono. Under this name, he issued a disco LP in 1983 which, though meant as a satire of Poland's disco culture, turned out to be a great success. Fronczewski started his acting career playing in the theater. He also performed in cabarets. His daughters – Kasia and Magda Fronczewska were very popular child-singers in late 1980s and early 1990s.

From his TV and movie work, he is best known as Pan Kleks (Mr Inkblot), the main character of a series of movies based on books written by Jan Brzechwa and illustrated by Craig Bonner. He also voiced Robert "Bob" Parr Mr. Incredible in the Polish dub of The Incredibles franchise and Diego in the Polish version of the Ice Age film series.

In 1990, Gustaw Holoubek ranked Piotr Fronczewski among the three greatest Polish dramatic actors post-1965 alongside Andrzej Seweryn and Wojciech Pszoniak. He played leading roles in films with prominent Polish directors, e.g. Andrzej Wajda, as well as many supporting roles in big productions. He is well known for playing "Pan Piotrus" in the Cabaret of Olga Lipinska. Later, he became active on the Polish Cabaret and standup comedy scene. Piotr Fronczewski is known as a master of intelligent humour and snappy retort.

== Selected filmography ==
- 1958 – Wolne miasto as Boguś
- 1972 – Boleslaw Smialy as Brother Adalbertus
- 1974 – Ziemia Obiecana as von Horn
- 1975 – A Woman's Decision as Jan
- 1976 – Parada Oszustów as Narrator and additional roles
- 1978 – Halo Szpicbródka as Fred Kampinos / Szpicbródka
- 1979 – Kung-Fu as Witek Markowski
- 1980 – The Moth as Psychiatrist
- 1980 – Głosy as Andrzej Domański, former husband of Ewa
- 1981 – The Quack as Dobraniecki
- 1982 – Aby do świtu... as Szczygieł
- 1983 – Akademia Pana Kleksa as Professor Ambroży Kleks and Jan Brzechwa
- 1983 – Szaleństwa Panny Ewy as dr Hieronim Tyszowski
- 1983 – In the Land of the Wizard of Oz as Scarecrow (voice, episodes 1-7)
- 1985 – Podróże pana Kleksa as Professor Ambroży Kleks
- 1987 – Cesarskie cięcie as Dr. Erdman
- 1987 – Zabij mnie glino as Zientara
- 1988 – Pan Kleks w Kosmosie as Professor Ambroży Kleks
- 1989 – Konsul as Czesław Wiśniak / Jacek Ben Silberstein
- 1989 – A Tale of Adam Mickiewicz's 'Forefathers' Eve' as Sobolewski
- 1990 – Escape from the 'Liberty' Cinema as Party Secretary
- 1994 – Tata, a Marcin powiedział as Dad
- 1995 – Awantura o Basię as Stanisław Olszowski
- 1997 – Rover Dangerfield as Rover Dangerfield (voice, Polish dub)
- 1998 – Billboard as „Kaleka”
- 1999 – Lot 001 as Captain
- 1999 – Tygrysy Europy as Henryk Laskowski
- 1999 – Rodzina zastępcza as Jacek Kwiatkowski
- 2001 – Tryumf pana Kleksa as Professor Ambroży Kleks (voice)
- 2002 – Day of the Wacko as TV doctor
- 2002 – Ice Age as Diego (voice, Polish dub)
- 2004 – The Incredibles as Bob Parr / Mr. Incredible (voice, Polish dub)
- 2006 – Rozmowy z katem as Jürgen Stroop
- 2016 – The Jungle Book as King Louie (voice, Polish dub)
- 2018 – Incredibles 2 as Bob Parr / Mr. Incredible (voice, Polish dub)
- 2018 – The Mire as Hotel Manager
- 2021 – Kontrakt as the Narrator
- 2024 – Akademia Pana Kleksa as Dr. Pai-Khi-Wo

== See also ==
- Polish cinema
- Polish Film Awards
