= Pan Kleks w kosmosie =

1988 fantasy film

- Theatrical release poster
- Directed by: Krzysztof Gradowski
- Written by: Krzysztof Gradowski
- Starring: Piotr Fronczewski; Jan Jankowski; Henryk Bista; Piotr Ptaszyński; Monika Sapilak; Bohdan Smoleń; Maryla Rodowicz
- Music by: Andrzej Korzyński
- Release date: 1988
- Countries: Poland; Czechoslovakia
- Language: Polish

Pan Kleks w kosmosie (lit. 'Mr. Kleks in Space', 'Mr. Inkblot in Space' or 'Mr. Blot in Space'), also known as Mr. Blob in the Universe, is a 1988 fantasy film directed by Krzysztof Gradowski. It is the third film based on the Pan Kleks book series by Jan Brzechwa, following Akademia pana Kleksa (1983) and Podróże pana Kleksa (1985), both of which were also directed by Gradowski.

An international co-production of Poland and Czechoslovakia, Pan Kleks w kosmosie stars Piotr Fronczewski, Jan Jankowski, Henryk Bista, Piotr Ptaszyński, Monika Sapilak and Bohdan Smoleń. Singer Maryla Rodowicz also appears in the film.

== Plot ==
The children of the State Orphanage in Maliszewo receive a computer as a Christmas gift from a former resident, Jacek Bronowski, now living in the United States. During the night, the computer mysteriously turns on by itself and tells the children a story set 25 years into the future.

The Great Electronics Engineer, who had fled the Island of Inventors and settled on the distant planet Mango, is working on a groundbreaking invention—an apparatus for "phantomization." This process involves breaking an object into elementary particles and transporting it through space and time. His first test subject is the ARGO 14-17 spacecraft. At the request of Mango's governor, Don Manuel Carmello de Bazar, the Great Electronics Engineer agrees to use his invention to bring a young girl from Earth to serve as the governor's beloved daughter. The chosen child is Agnieszka, a third-grade student at the Stanisław Lem Primary School. After she is abducted to Mango, her classmates seek help from the reclusive Mr. Kleks, who lives in the last nature reserve on Earth. Convinced that children had forgotten about him, Mr. Kleks decides to aid them in rescuing their friend.

Accompanied by classmate Groszek, Groszek's father Commander Max Benson, and a creature named Melo-Smiler, Mr. Kleks embarks on the VOLTAN II spacecraft for a perilous journey to Mango. There, he faces an ultimate showdown with his longtime nemesis, the Great Electronics Engineer.

At the film's conclusion, after the computer finishes recounting the story, two mechanics arrive, claiming they need to repair the machine. The children recognize them as Alojzy Bąbel and the Great Electronics Engineer in disguise and chase them away.

== Screenplay ==
The film marked a departure from earlier installments in the series. Unlike its predecessors, Pan Kleks in Space did not draw from the literary works of Jan Brzechwa. Instead, the director crafted an original screenplay, placing the titular character in a storyline shaped by their own vision. Despite this shift, the film includes references to earlier entries, particularly continuing the subplot involving the Great Electronics Engineer introduced in The Travels of Mr. Kleks.

== Filming locations ==
The movie was filmed across Poland, Czechoslovakia, and the Soviet Union. The UFO-shaped café located on the SNP Bridge in Bratislava served as the Space Forces Command Center, while the interior was portrayed using the operations hall of the State Power Dispatch Center. Other notable locations include the Azoty Puławy chemical plant, the Petrochemia refinery in Płock, and the Bełchatów Power Plant.
