= Statue of the Beetle =

Monument in Szczebrzeszyn, Poland

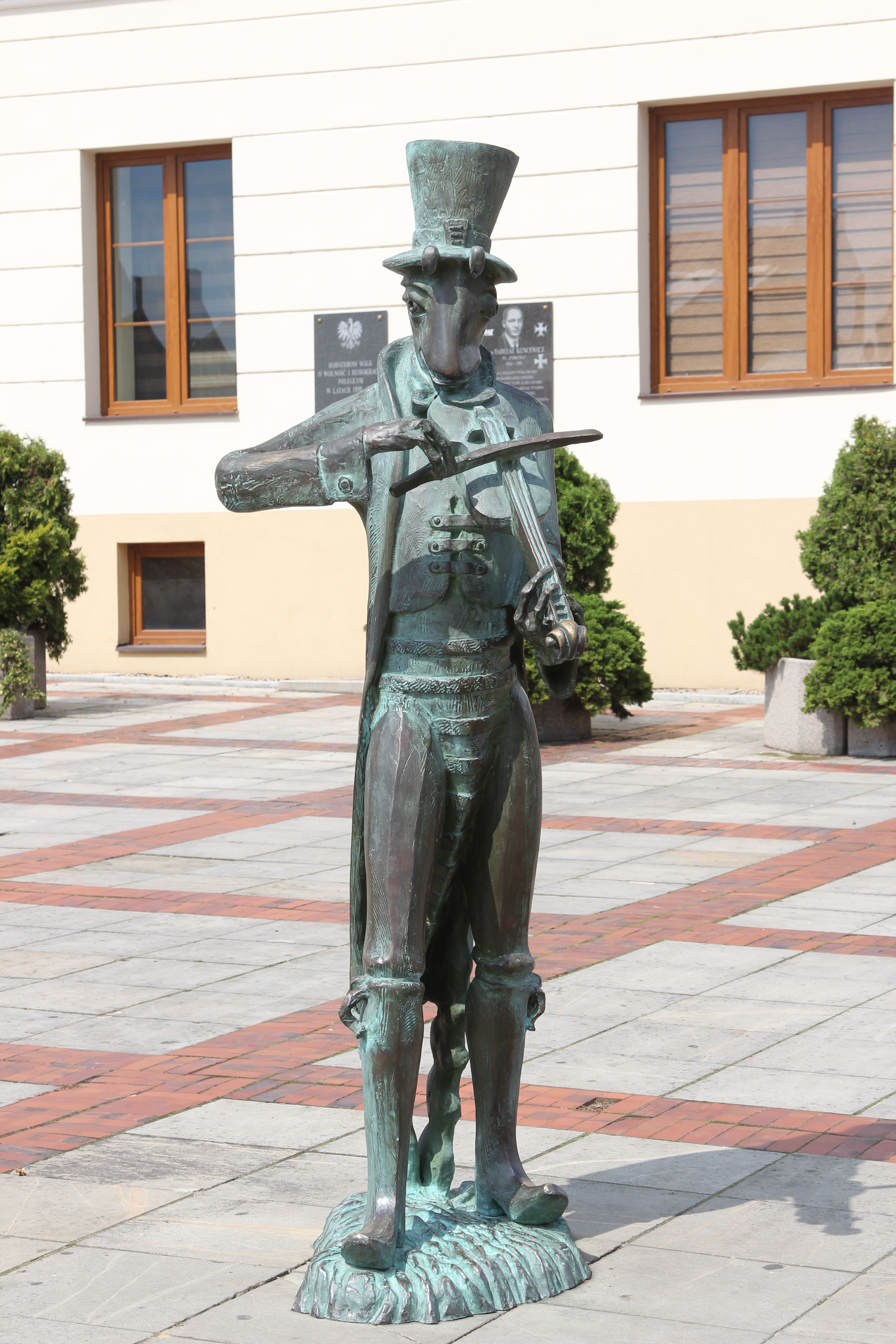
- The statue in 2018.
- Interactive map of Statue of the Beetle
- Location: 1 Kościuszko Square, Szczebrzeszyn, Lublin Voivodeship, Poland
- Coordinates: 50°41′41.42″N 22°58′43.57″E
- Designer: Zygmunt Jarmuł
- Type: Statue
- Material: Bronze
- Height: c. 2 m (6 ft 7 in)
- Opening date: 23 July 2011

The statue of the Beetle (Polish: Pomnik chrząszcza) is a bronze statue in the town of Szczebrzeszyn in Lublin Voivodeship, Poland. It is placed in front of the Szczebrzeszy Town Hall at 1 Kościuszko Square. It depicts an anthropomorphic insect wearing a dinner suit and a top hat, and playing on a fiddle. While claimed to depict a beetle, it is closer in appearance to the Orthoptera order (which includes grasshoppers and crickets). It was designed by Zygmunt Jarmuł and unveiled on 23 July 2011. The sculpture commemorates the 1938 Polish-language tongue twister poem Chrząszcz (lit. 'The Beatle') by Jan Brzechwa, with which the town is widely associated.

== History ==
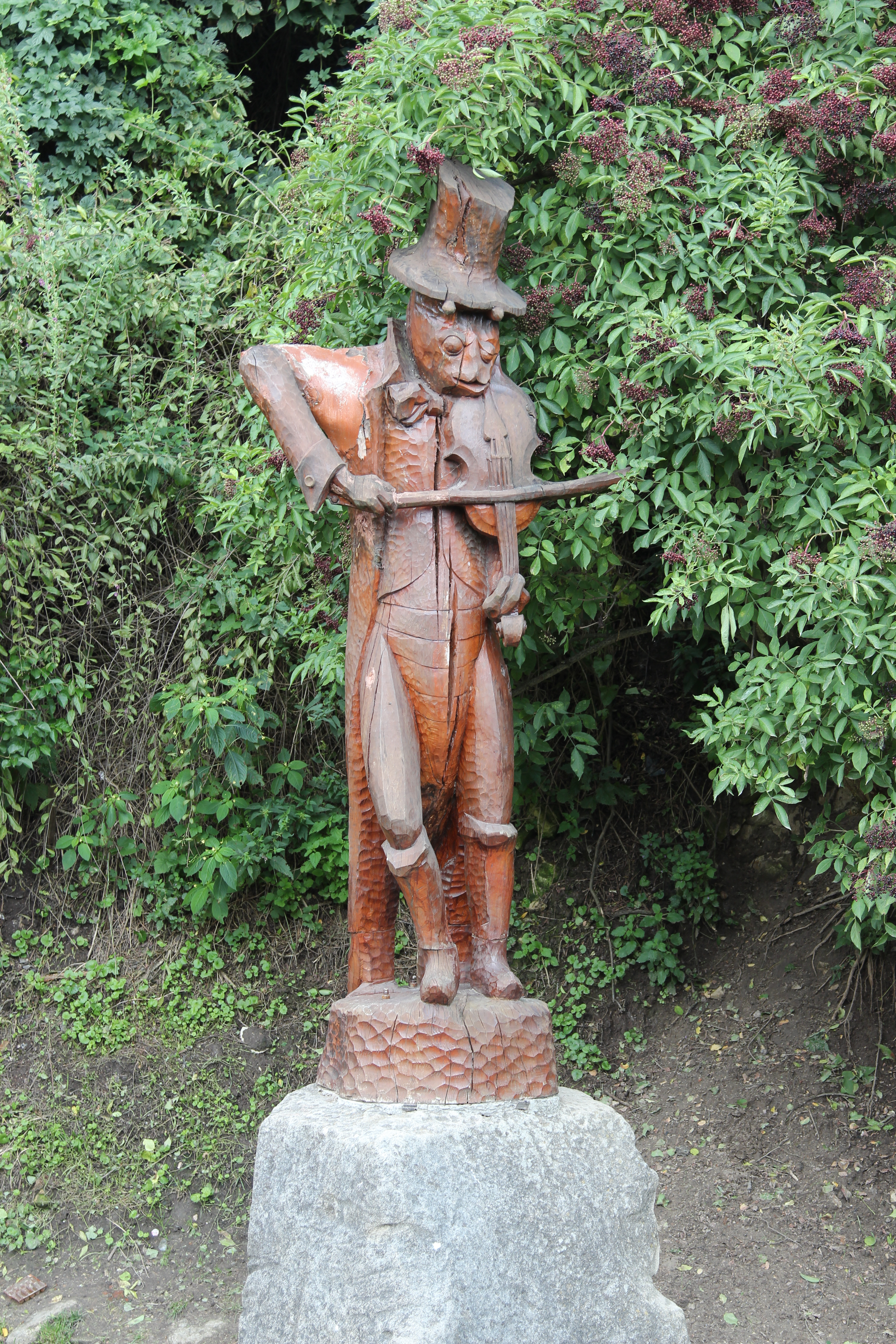
The original wooden statue of the Beetle, unveiled in 2002 in Szczebrzeszyn.

In September 2002, a statue depicting an anthropomorphic beetle playing on a fiddle was unveiled in the town of Szczebrzeszyn. It was sculpted by students of the Secondary School of Arts in Zamość under the supervision of Zygmunt Jarmuł. The sculpture was made from linden wood, messuring 3 m (9.84 ft) in height, and 1 m (3.28 ft) in width. It was placed on a stone pedestal. The statue was unveiled on Klukowskiego Street, at the foot of the Castle Hill, next to a spring flowing to the nearby Wieprz river. The sculpture was created to commemorate the 1938 Polish-language tongue twister poem Chrząszcz (lit. 'The Beatle') by Jan Brzechwa. The own is widely associated with the poem, with its first line reading "W Szczebrzeszynie chrząszcz brzmi w trzcinie" (lit. 'In Szczebrzeszyn a beetle buzzes in the reeds'). On 26 October 2018, following the sculpture's deterioration, it was replaced with a new replica created by Zygmunt Jarmuł.

The city commissioned Zygmunt Jarmuł to create another statue of a beetle. It was unveiled on 23 July 2011, in front of the Szczebrzeszyn Town Hall at 1 Kościuszko Square. Cast in bronze, the statue depicted an anthropomorphic insect wearing a dinner suit and a top hat, and playing on a fiddle. 70% of its cost have been funded from a European Union financial program. Despite claimed to depict an anthropomorphic beetle, its appearance have been described to be closer to an insect of the Orthoptera order (which includes grasshoppers and crickets).

== Characteristics ==
The statue is made of bronze, and is placed in front of the Szczebrzeszyn Town Hall at 1 Kościuszko Square. Despite claimed to depict an anthropomorphic beetle, its appearance is closer to an insect of the Orthoptera order, which includes grasshoppers and crickets. It is depicted wearing a dinner suit and a top hat, and playing on a fiddle, and measures 2 m (6.56 ft) in height.
