= Akademia pana Kleksa (film) =

1983 fantasy film

- Theatrical release poster
- Directed by: Krzysztof Gradowski
- Written by: Krzysztof Gradowski
- Based on: Akademia pana Kleksa by Jan Brzechwa
- Starring: Piotr Fronczewski; Sławomir Wronka; Leon Niemczyk
- Cinematography: Zygmunt Samosiuk
- Edited by: Teresa Miziołek
- Music by: Andrzej Korzyński
- Production companies: Zespół Filmowy Zodiak; Gorky Film Studio
- Distributed by: Przedsiębiorstwo Dystrybucji Filmów
- Release date: 1983
- Countries: Poland; Soviet Union
- Language: Polish

Akademia pana Kleksa (lit. 'Mr. Blot's Academy') is a 1983 fantasy film directed by Krzysztof Gradowski. An international co-production of Poland and the Soviet Union, the film is based on the 1946 children's novel of the same name by Jan Brzechwa, and is divided into two parts: Przygoda księcia Mateusza (Prince Matthew's Adventure) and Tajemnica Golarza Filipa (Mystery of Philip the Barber).

Akademia pana Kleksa stars Piotr Fronczewski and Sławomir Wronka.

== Plot ==
Ten-year-old Adaś Niezgódka (Sławomir Wronka) joins Mr. Kleks' Academy, run by the eccentric teacher Ambroży Kleks (Piotr Fronczewski). In addition to the main storyline (the adventures at the academy), the film develops various other subplots, such as the story of the mysterious starling Mateusz, who was once a human prince, Adaś's journey to the dog heaven, and more.

The idyllic atmosphere of the film is disturbed by the character of Filip the Barber (Leon Niemczyk), the antagonist, who sends an android called Adolf (Robert Pluciński) to the Academy to destroy the fairy-tale world that exists there.

== Release ==
An estimated 14,094,014 people saw the film during its initial theatrical release.

== Sequels ==
Akademia pana Kleksa was followed by two sequels, both also directed by Gradowski: Podróże pana Kleksa (1985) and Pan Kleks w kosmosie (1988).

== Reboot ==
In 2023, a reboot was produced with the same title. This version is distributed in English on the streaming platform Netflix. In 2024, the second part of the film was released titled Kleks i wynalazek Filipa Golarza.
