= Magda Fronczewska =

- Born: Magdalena Fronczewska; 30 October 1978 (age 47); Warsaw, Poland
- Genres: children's music
- Instrument: Vocals
- Years active: c.1986 – c.1993

Magdalena Fronczewska (born 30 October 1978) is a Polish former child singer. Fronczewska started singing around the age of 8–9. At first, she accompanied popular Polish singer for children Majka Jeżowska, but soon had her own songs, written mostly by Jacek Cygan, a well known in Polish songwriter. Some of them appeared on Fronczewska's album WOW in 1990. Some of her songs became a part of "Dyskoteka Pana Jacka" series of concerts and music albums for children. In 1986, Magda made a cameo appearance in Podróże Pana Kleksa movie and was a guest of many TV and radio programs for children.

In 1997, Fronczewska tried to restart her career as an adult but was unsuccessful and has not appeared publicly since then.

== Family ==
Fronczewska's father is popular actor Piotr Fronczewski. Her sister, Katarzyna "Kasia" Fronczewska was also a child singer. They accompanied Majka Jeżowska at the same time, but Kasia never tried to continue a solo career. She also appeared in Podróże Pana Kleksa, as well as guest-appeared in an episode of TV show 07 zgłoś się.

== Sources ==
- Profile at filmpolski.pl
- Fronczewska's concert on YouTube
- "Wow" and other songs on YouTube
- Dyskoteka Pana Jacka 2 on YouTube
