= Be a Clown =

Song from "The Pirate"

"Be a Clown" is a song written by Cole Porter for the 1948 film The Pirate. The song was performed twice in the film: first by Gene Kelly and The Nicholas Brothers and then at the end of the film by Kelly and Judy Garland.

The song "Make 'Em Laugh" in the film Singin' in the Rain is very similar to "Be a Clown". Both films were Metro-Goldwyn-Mayer productions and starred Kelly, who appeared in (but did not sing) the "Make 'Em Laugh" segment of the latter film, in which the song was performed by Donald O'Connor.
