= Betty Botta =

Tongue twister written by Carolyn Wells

Betty Botter
Recitation of the Betty Botter tongue twister

Betty Botta is a tongue twister written by American author Carolyn Wells in her book "The Jingle Book" published in 1899. It was originally titled The Butter Betty Bought. By the middle of the 20th century, it had become part of the Mother Goose collection of nursery rhymes.

== Construction ==
The construction is based on alliteration, using the repeated two-syllable pattern /'b__tə 'b__tə 'b__tə/ with a range of vowels in the first, stressed syllable. The difficulty is in clearly and consistently differentiating all the vowels from each other. Except for /ɔː/ (bought a), they are all short vowels:

- /æ/ (batter)
- /e/ (better, Betty)
- /ɪ/ (bitter, bit o’)
- /ɒ/ (Botta)
- /ʌ/ (butter)

== Lyrics ==
When it was first published in "The Jingle Book" in 1899, it read:

Betty Botta bought some butter;
"But," said she, "this butter's bitter!
If I put it in my batter
It will make my batter bitter.
But a bit o' better butter
Will but make my batter better."
Then she bought a bit o' butter
Better than the bitter butter,
Made her bitter batter better.
So 'twas better Betty Botta
Bought a bit o' better butter.

— The Butter Betty Bought, The Jingle Book

== Variations ==
Lynn Tomlinson created an animated version that was featured on the television channel PBS Kids. In this variation the rhyme is as follows:

Betty Botter bought some butter,
but the butter, it was bitter.
If she put it in her batter,
it would make her batter bitter,
but a bit of better butter,
that would make her batter better.
So, she bought a bit of butter,
better than her bitter butter,
And she put it in her batter,
and her batter was not bitter.
So, T'was better Betty Botter
bought a bit of better butter.

Other variations can be found online:

Betty Botter bought a bit of butter
but, she said, this butter's bitter;
if I put it in my batter, it will make my batter bitter.
so she bought some better butter,
and it made her bitter batter better.

Betty Botter bought some butter,
But Betty Botter found her butter bitter.
So Betty Botter bought some better butter.
A little bit of bitter butter didn't bother Betty.
But her better butter better not be bitter!
