= Pan Kleks =

Fictional character

Ambroży Kleks
- Pan Kleks character
- First appearance: Akademia pana Kleksa (1946)
- Last appearance: Tryumf pana Kleksa (1965)
- Created by: Jan Brzechwa
- Portrayed by: Piotr Fronczewski (1983-2001); Tomasz Kot (2023-present)

In-universe information
- Occupation: Headmaster of his magical Academy

Professor Ambroży Kleks (English: Ambrose Inkblot), commonly referred to as Pan Kleks (English: Mr. Inkblot or Mr. Blot), is a fictional character in the Pan Kleks series, a trilogy of books written by Polish author Jan Brzechwa. He is depicted as the founder and headmaster of a magical academy for wizards that is attended by boys whose names begin with the letter "A". Kleks is depicted as a tall and eccentric man with a bushy beard, who wears a velvet frock coat over a waistcoat with numerous pockets. Among his magical abilities is his ability to change his size.

The character was partly based on Franciszek Fiszer, a Polish metaphysician and alchemist known to the literary circles of pre-World War II Warsaw.

Kleks was portrayed by Piotr Fronczewski in three films based on the book series, each of which were directed by Krzysztof Gradowski: Akademia pana Kleksa (1983), Podróże pana Kleksa (1986) and Pan Kleks w kosmosie (1988). Fronczewski also voiced the character in the 2001 animated film Tryumf pana Kleksa.

== Book series ==
- Akademia pana Kleksa (Academy of Mr. Kleks, 1946)
- Podróże pana Kleksa (Travels of Mr. Kleks, 1961)
- Tryumf pana Kleksa (Triumph of Mr. Kleks, 1965)

== Films ==
=== Classic series ===
- Akademia pana Kleksa (Academy of Mr. Kleks, 1983)
- Podróże pana Kleksa (Travels of Mr. Kleks, 1986)
- Pan Kleks w kosmosie (Mr. Kleks in Space, 1988)
- Tryumf pana Kleksa (Triumph of Mr. Kleks, 2001, animated)

=== Modern series ===
- Akademia pana Kleksa (film 2023)
- Kleks i wynalazek Filipa Golarza (2025)

== Other media ==
- Przygody pana Kleksa (musical), 1974
- Niezwykłe przygody pana Kleksa (television play), 1980
- Akademia pana Kleksa (musical), 2007

== See also ==
- Jonka, Jonek and Kleks
