= Strč prst skrz krk =

Czech- and Slovak-language tongue twister

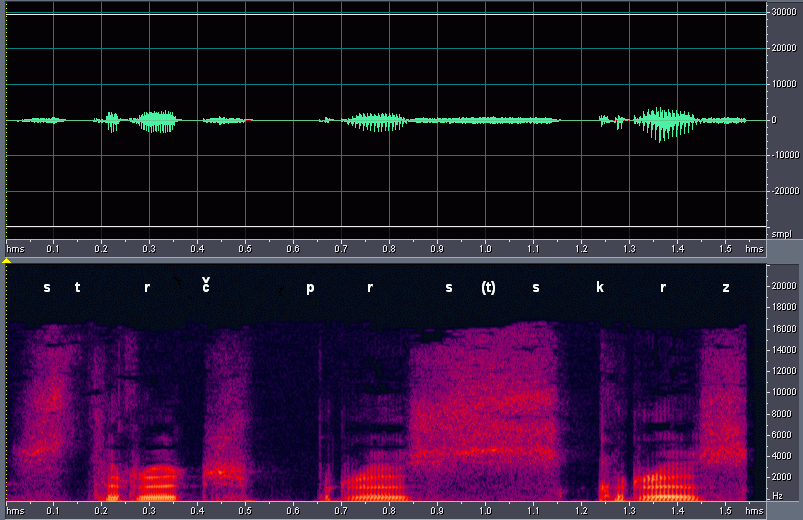
Waveform and spectrogram for the Czech expression

Milan Cabrnoch pronouncing Strč prst skrz krk in 2014

Strč prst skrz krk (pronounced [str̩tʃ pr̩st skr̩s kr̩k]) is a tongue twister in Czech and Slovak meaning 'stick a finger through the neck'. The sentence is well known for being a semantically and syntactically valid clause without a single vowel, the nucleus of each syllable being a syllabic r, a common feature among many Slavic languages. It is often used as an example of such a phrase when learning Czech or Slovak as a foreign language.

In addition to the syllabic r, Czech and Slovak both feature another syllabic liquid consonant — the syllabic l. Czech also has a syllabic /m/ in words like sedm (/ˈsɛdm̩/). As a result, the two languages have plenty of words that phonemically lacks a vowel. Examples of long words of this type are scvrnkls (/st͡svr̩ŋkl̩s/) 'you (m.) flicked (something) away', čtvrthrst 'quarter handful', and čtvrtsmršť 'quarter whirlwind', the latter two being artificial, though grammatical, constructs unlikely to occur spontaneously.

There are other examples of vowelless sentences in Czech and Slovak, such as prd krt skrz drn, zprv zhlt hrst zrn, meaning 'a mole farted through grass, having swallowed a handful of grains'.

The longest Czech vowelless sentence (with 25 words and 82 consonants) composed as of 2013 is Škrt plch z mlh Brd pln skvrn z mrv prv hrd scvrnkl z brzd skrz trs chrp v krs vrb mls mrch srn čtvrthrst zrn, meaning 'Stingy dormouse from Brdy mountains fogs full of manure spots firstly proudly shrank a quarter of handful seeds, a delicacy for mean does, from brakes through bunch of Centaurea flowers into scrub of willows'.

== See also ==
- Shibboleth
- Consonant cluster
- Chrząszcz
