= Moses supposes his toeses are roses =

English-language nonsense verse

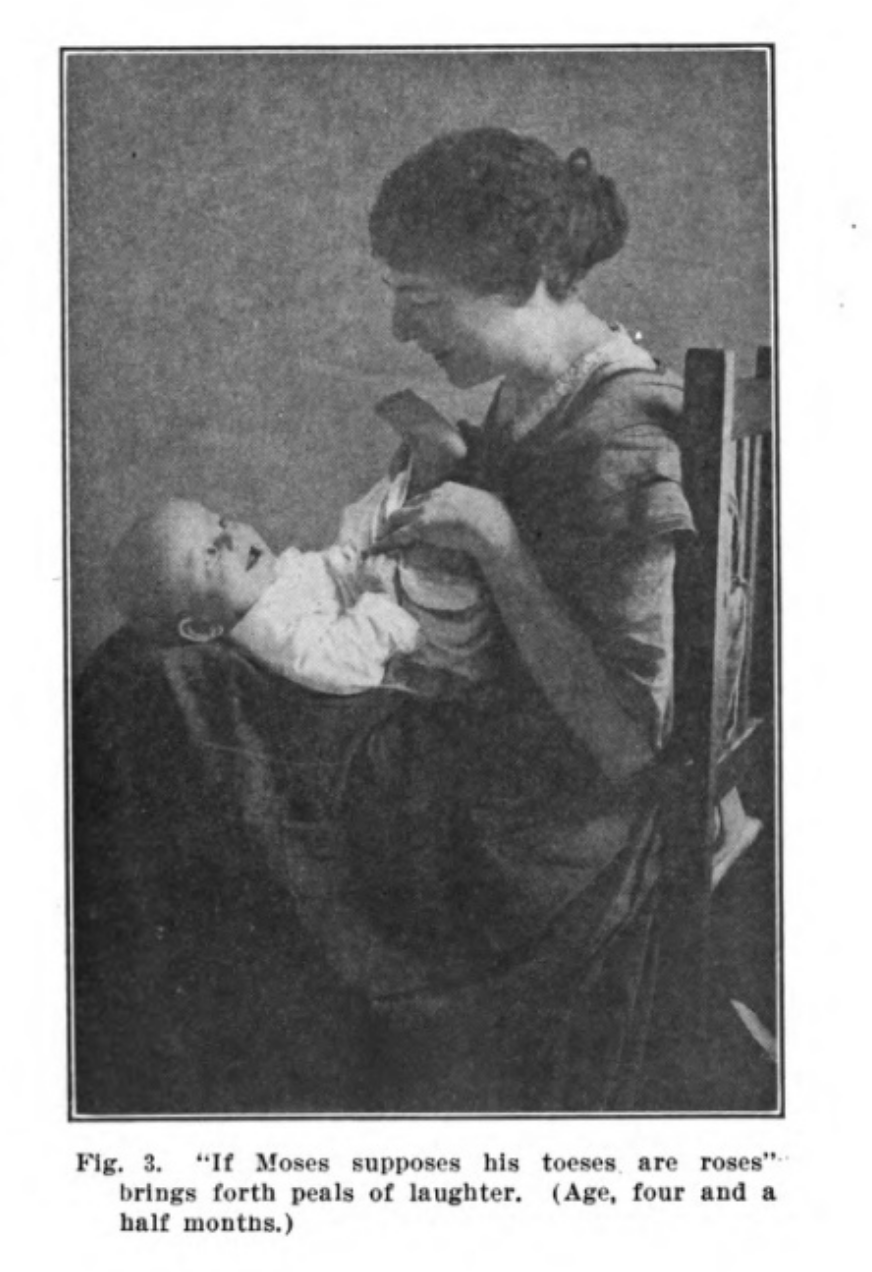
Mother playing with infant, singing the tongue-twister (1913).

"Moses supposes his toeses are roses" is a piece of English-language nonsense verse and a tongue-twister, whimsically describing the prophet Moses mistakenly conjecturing his toes are roses, contrary to biological reality.

== Lyrics ==
While the earliest origins of the verses are unclear, a version published in 1888 described as "causing much distress of mind to the habitue of Minnetonka", runs:

Moses supposes his toeses are roses;
Moses supposes erroneously,
For nobody's toeses are roses or posies,
As Moses supposes his toeses to be.

In 1895, a slightly different version was published:

If Moses supposes his toeses are roses,
Then Moses supposes erroneously;
For nobody's toeses are posies or roses,
As Moses supposes his toeses to be.

A variation from 1944, perhaps most well-known today, has:

Moses supposes his toeses are roses,
but Moses supposes erroneously.
For Moses he knowses his toeses aren't roses
as Moses supposes his toeses to be.

== In popular culture ==
In 1952, this last version was used as the basis for the nonsense song with the same name in the musical comedy Singin' in the Rain, sung by the characters of Gene Kelly and Donald O'Connor during the diction lesson scene. The tongue twister is sung in 4/4 time in ostinati harmony.

In 2013, the YouTube channel of anime director Takeshi Satou uploaded an anime-style cover of the Singin' in the Rain rendition of the verse. In the animation, a lonely ghost girl (yūrei) finds a pair of tap shoes that come to life dancing along with the song. She then joins the dance until the shoes literally "give up the ghost". The animation was highly praised for its joyful simplicity and high quality.
