= Make 'Em Laugh =

Song from Singin' in the Rain

- Australian label

Song by Donald O'Connor
- Released: 1952
- Recorded: 1951–1952
- Genre: Showtune
- Length: 3:17
- Songwriters: Nacio Herb Brown; Arthur Freed

"Make 'Em Laugh" is a song first featured in the 1952 MGM musical film Singin' in the Rain, performed by Donald O'Connor as the character Cosmo Brown. Written by Arthur Freed and Nacio Herb Brown, the song is closely based on Cole Porter's "Be a Clown" from the Freed-produced 1948 MGM musical film The Pirate, in which it was sung by Gene Kelly and Judy Garland. In the song, Cosmo explains that he loves making people laugh, and quotes back to the inspiring words of a man named Samuel J. Snodgrass (as he was about to be led to the guillotine), his dad and his grandpa (though it's made unclear whether Cosmo refers to Snodgrass's or his own relatives).

O'Connor's performance for "Make 'Em Laugh" is noted for its extreme physical difficulty, featuring dozens of jumps, pratfalls, stunts, and two wall flips. Hollywood legend states that O'Connor, though only 27 years old at the time but a chain-smoker, was bedridden for several days after filming the sequence. The routine is often cited as a tour de force in physical comedy.

"Make 'Em Laugh" is listed at #49 in AFI's 100 Years...100 Songs survey of top tunes in American cinema.

== Song structure ==
Songwriter and MGM "Freed unit" producer Arthur Freed used his own library of songs written with Nacio Herb Brown as the basis for the musical film Singin' in the Rain. Screenwriters Betty Comden and Adolph Green recall that before shooting had started, they had "painfully wedged into the script as a cheering-up song" for Donald O'Connor the Freed/Brown song "The Wedding of the Painted Doll", but during filming, Freed realized that O'Connor needed a better number, but could not find anything suitable for his character within his collection.

Co-director Stanley Donen referenced the Cole Porter song "Be a Clown" from the film The Pirate, and further suggested that Freed and Brown compose a song using this as their inspiration. However, Donen recalled, the resulting number was "100% plagiarism." Both music and lyrics of "Make 'Em Laugh" are nearly identical in form and style to "Be a Clown". Although Cole Porter had unchallenged reason to bring suit, he never sued for copyright infringement. In a 2002 interview, Betty Comden recalled, "How [Freed] could have written it in the first place — and not realized — is still a mystery. We have no idea, and we never brought it up with Arthur, either before or after that day ... It's fabulous, but the song's exactly like 'Be a Clown.'"
