= Akademia pana Kleksa (novel) =

1946 children's novel by Jan Brzechwa

- First edition cover
- Author: Jan Brzechwa
- Language: Polish
- Genre: Children's fantasy
- Publication date: 1946
- Publication place: Poland

Akademia Pana Kleksa (known in English as The Academy of Mr. Kleks, The Academy of Mr. Inkblot, or Mr. Inkblot's Academy) is a children's fantasy novel by Polish author Jan Brzechwa. First published in 1946, the book is the first in a trilogy of works by Brzechwa featuring the fictional character Professor Ambroży Kleks (Ambrose Inkblot)—commonly referred to as Pan Kleks, (Mr. Kleks)—the headmaster of a magical academy for wizards.

== Summary ==
Akademia Pana Kleksa takes place at a magical academy for wizards run by the eccentric professor Ambroży Kleks (Ambrose Inkblot). The school is located in the fictional Fairylandia, at the end of Chocolate Street. The book follows Adaś Niezgódka (Adam Contrary), an unhappy, bullied 12-year-old boy who is guided to the academy by a raven blackbird. Adaś, along with 23 other boys attending the school—all of whose names begin with the letter "A"—are taught magical subjects by Kleks, including "kleksografia" ("inkblotography"), weaving of the letters, and how to magically repair broken objects.

== Sequels ==
Akademia pana Kleksa was followed by two sequels, also written by Brzechwa: Podróże Pana Kleksa (Travels of Mr. Kleks, 1961), and Tryumf pana Kleksa (Triumph of Mr. Kleks, 1965).

== Film adaptation ==
In 1983, Akademia Pana Kleksa was adapted into a two-part feature film of the same name, directed by Krzysztof Gradowski.

On 8 December 2022, a teaser for a new Polish screen adaptation was released: Akademia pana Kleksa (2023 film) (Kleks Academy, 2023), directed by Maciej Kawulski. The film stars internationally known actor Tomasz Kot as Mr. Blot, and Antonina Litwiniak as Ada, a female version of Adaś Niezgódka. This version is distributed in English on the streaming platform Netflix. In 2024, the second part of the film was released titled Kleks i wynalazek Filipa Golarza. These films are considered a reboot of the series.
