= Tongue twister =

Phrase intentionally difficult to articulate properly

A tongue twister is a phrase that is designed to be difficult to articulate properly, and can be used as a type of spoken (or sung) word game. Additionally, they can be used as exercises to improve pronunciation and fluency. Some tongue twisters produce results that are humorous (or humorously vulgar) when they are mispronounced, while others simply rely on the confusion and mistakes of the speaker for their amusement value.

== Types ==
Some tongue twisters rely on rapid alternation between similar but distinct phonemes (e.g., s [s] and sh [ʃ]), combining two different alternation patterns, familiar constructs in loanwords, or other features of a spoken language to be difficult to articulate. For example, the following sentence was said to be "the most difficult of common English-language tongue twisters" by William Poundstone.

The seething sea ceaseth and thus the seething sea sufficeth us.

These deliberately difficult expressions were popular in the 19th century. The popular "she sells seashells" tongue twister was originally published in 1850 as a diction exercise. The term "tongue twister" was first applied to this kind of expression in 1895.

"She sells seashells" was turned into a popular song in 1908, with words by British songwriter Terry Sullivan and music by Harry Gifford. According to folklore, it was said to be inspired by the life and work of Mary Anning, an early fossil collector. However, there is no evidence that Anning inspired either the tongue twister or the song.

She sells sea-shells by the sea-shore.
The shells she sells are sea-shells, I'm sure.
For if she sells sea-shells by the sea-shore
Then I'm sure she sells sea-shore shells.

Another well-known tongue twister is "Peter Piper":

Peter Piper picked a peck of pickled peppers
A peck of pickled peppers Peter Piper picked
If Peter Piper picked a peck of pickled peppers
Where's the peck of pickled peppers Peter Piper picked

Many tongue twisters use a combination of alliteration and rhyme. They have two or more sequences of sounds that require repositioning the tongue between syllables, then the same sounds are repeated in a different sequence. An example of this is the song "Betty Botter", first published in 1899:

Betty Botter bought a bit of butter. "But," she said, "this butter's bitter!
If I put it in my batter, it will make my batter bitter!"
So she bought a bit of butter better than her bitter butter,
And she put it in her batter, and her batter was not bitter.
So 'twas better Betty Botter bought a bit of better butter.

There are twisters that make use of compound words and their stems, for example:

How much wood would a woodchuck chuck
if a woodchuck could chuck wood?
A woodchuck would chuck all the wood he could chuck
if a woodchuck would chuck wood.

The following twister entered a contest in Games Magazine on the November/December 1979 issue and was announced the winner on the March/April 1980 issue:

Shep Schwab shopped at Scott's Schnapps shop;
One shot of Scott's Schnapps stopped Schwab's watch.

Some tongue twisters take the form of words or short phrases which become tongue twisters when repeated rapidly (the game is often expressed in the form "Say this phrase three (or five, or ten, etc.) times as fast as you can!"). Examples include:

- Toy boat
- Cricket critic
- Unique New York
- A proper copper coffee pot
- Red leather, yellow leather
- Irish wristwatch, Swiss wristwatch
- Peggy Babcock
- Red lorry, yellow lorry

Some tongue twisters are used for speech practice and vocal warmup:

The lips, the teeth, the tip of the tongue,
the tip of the tongue, the teeth, the lips.

Tongue twisters are used to train pronunciation skills in non-native speakers:

The sheep on the ship slipped on the sheet of sleet.

Other types of tongue twisters derive their humor from producing vulgar results only when performed incorrectly:

Old Mother Hunt had a rough cut punt
Not a punt cut rough,
But a rough cut punt.

One smart feller, he felt smart,
Two smart fellers, they both felt smart,
Three smart fellers, they all felt smart.

Some twisters are amusing because they sound incorrect even when pronounced correctly:

Are you copperbottoming those pans, my man?
No, I'm aluminiuming 'em Ma'am.

In 2013, MIT researchers claimed that this is the trickiest twister to date:

Pad kid poured curd pulled cold

== Linguistics ==
=== Phonemes ===
Based on the MIT confusion matrix of 1620 single phoneme errors, the phoneme with the greatest margin of speech error is l [l] mistaken for r [r]. Other phonemes that had a high level of speech error include s [s] mistaken for sh [ʃ], f [f] for p [p], r [r] for l [l], w [w] for r [r], and many more. These sounds are most likely to transform to a similar sound when placed in near vicinity of each other. Most of these mix-ups can be attributed to the two phonemes having similar areas of articulation in the mouth.

Pronunciation difficulty is also theorized to have an effect on tongue twisters. For example, t [t] is thought to be easier to pronounce than ch [tʃ]. As a result, speakers may naturally transform ch [tʃ] to t [t] or when trying to pronounce certain tongue twisters.

=== Fortis and lenis ===
Fortis and lenis are the classification of strong and weak consonants.

Some characteristics of strong consonants include:

- high frequency in a language
- earlier development in language acquisition
- lower placement on the phonological hierarchy

It is common for more difficult sounds to be replaced with strong consonants in tongue twisters. This is partially determinant of which sounds are most likely to transform to other sounds with linguistic confusion.

== Other languages ==
Tongue twisters exist in many languages, such as Spanish: trabalenguas, lit. 'tongue jammer', and German: Zungenbrecher, lit. 'tongue breaker'.

The complexity of tongue twisters varies from language to language. For example, in Luganda vowels differ by length so tongue twisters exploit vowel length: "Akawala akaawa Kaawa kaawa akaawa ka wa?". Translation: "The girl who gave Kaawa bitter coffee, where is she from?"

A famous Polish tongue twister is W Szczebrzeszynie chrząszcz brzmi w trzcinie (translation: In Szczebrzeszyn a beetle buzzes in the reeds). The beetle from it is depicted in two monuments.

=== Shibboleths ===
Shibboleths, that is, phrases in a language that are difficult for someone who is not a native speaker of that language to say might be regarded as a type of tongue-twist. An example is Georgian baq'aq'i ts'q'alshi q'iq'inebs ("a frog croaks in the water"), in which q' is a uvular ejective. Another example, the Czech and Slovak strč prst skrz krk ("stick a finger through the throat") is difficult for a non-native speaker due to the absence of vowels, although syllabic r is a common sound in Czech, Slovak and some other Slavic languages.

=== Finger-fumblers ===
The sign language equivalent of a tongue twister is called a finger-fumbler. According to Susan Fischer, the phrase Good blood, bad blood is a tongue twister in English as well as a finger-fumbler in ASL.

=== One-syllable article ===
One-syllable article is a form of Mandarin Chinese tongue twister, written in Classical Chinese. Due to Mandarin Chinese having only four tonal ranges (compared to nine in Cantonese, for example), these works sound like a work of one syllable in different tonal range when spoken in Mandarin, but are far more comprehensible when spoken in another dialect.

== In popular culture ==
- In 1951 Danny Kaye recorded a Sylvia Fine song titled "Tongue Twisters".
- The children's books by Dr. Seuss contain a significant number of tongue twisters, with Oh Say Can You Say?, and Fox in Socks being the most extreme cases.
- In the 1952 film Singin' in the Rain, movie star Don Lockwood (Gene Kelly) uses tongue twisters, such as Peter Piper, while learning proper diction so he can make the transition from silent films to "talkies" in 1920s Hollywood. He also turns one of them ("Moses supposes his toeses are roses") into a song and dance number along with his best friend Cosmo Brown (Donald O'Connor).
- In 1968, Jack Webb guested on The Tonight Show Starring Johnny Carson and took part in a parody of Dragnet. The premise was Webb (as Sgt. Joe Friday) grilling Carson about "kleptomaniac Claude Cooper from Cleveland, who copped clean copper clappers kept in a closet." The sketch was regularly shown on anniversary specials.
- In the episode "You Said a Mouseful" from Pinky and the Brain, both Pinky and Brain go through a collage of tongue twisters that cover almost every category possible.
- The TV series BoJack Horseman contains increasingly convoluted tongue twisters as the show progresses. The lines are often delivered by Princess Carolyn, and a notable set involves the actress 'Courtney Portnoy', for example: "How would you enjoy joining Portnoy for a scorched soy porterhouse pork four-courser at Koi?" followed by "Glorify your source, but don't make it feel forced, of course. And try the borscht!"
- Many examples of tongue twisters can be found in hip-hop. A commonly used tongue twister is "Peter Piper", as seen in the 1986 Run-D.M.C. song "Peter Piper".

== See also ==
- Alliteration
- Announcer's test
- Barbara's Rhubarb Bar
- Malapropism
- Spoonerism
- The death of one man is a tragedy, the death of millions is a statistic
- Theophilus Thistle
