= Singin' in the Rain =

1952 film by Gene Kelly and Stanley Donen

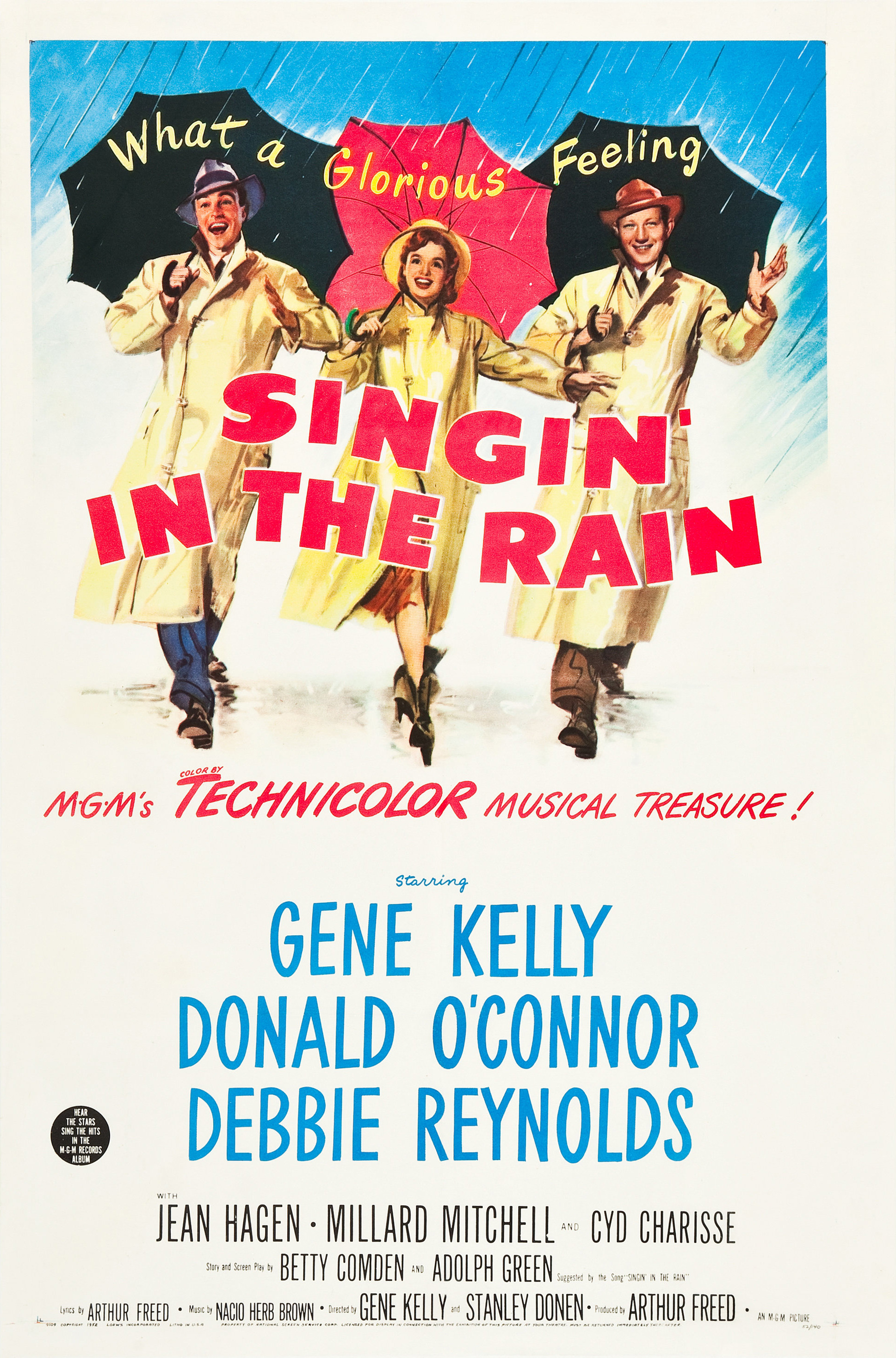
- Theatrical release poster
- Directed by: Gene Kelly; Stanley Donen
- Written by: Betty Comden; Adolph Green
- Suggested by: "Singin' in the Rain"
- Produced by: Arthur Freed
- Starring: Gene Kelly; Donald O'Connor; Debbie Reynolds; Jean Hagen; Millard Mitchell; Cyd Charisse
- Cinematography: Harold Rosson
- Edited by: Adrienne Fazan
- Music by: Lennie Hayton (musical direction); Songs: Arthur Freed (lyrics); Nacio Herb Brown (music)
- Color process: Technicolor
- Production company: Metro-Goldwyn-Mayer
- Distributed by: Loew's Inc.
- Release dates: March 27, 1952 (Radio City Music Hall); April 11, 1952 (United States)
- Running time: 103 minutes
- Country: United States
- Language: English
- Budget: $2.54 million
- Box office: $7.2 million

Singin' in the Rain is a 1952 American musical romantic comedy film directed and choreographed by Gene Kelly and Stanley Donen, starring Kelly, Donald O'Connor and Debbie Reynolds, with Jean Hagen, Millard Mitchell, Douglas Fowley, Rita Moreno and Cyd Charisse in supporting roles. It offers a lighthearted depiction of Hollywood in the late 1920s, with the three stars portraying performers caught up in the transition from silent films to "talkies".

Arthur Freed conceived the idea of the film based on the back catalogs of songs written by himself and Nacio Herb Brown. Because many of the songs had been written during the transition from silent films to "talkies", writers Betty Comden and Adolph Green decided that was when the story should be set. When the story morphed into that of a romantic hero with a vaudevillian background surviving the transition period in Hollywood and falling back onto his old song-and-dance habits, Kelly, who was chosen for the lead along with Donen, responded enthusiastically to it. After a premiere at the Radio City Music Hall, the film was released nationwide on April 11, 1952. Film historians note that Singin' in the Rain was not initially expected to become a classic, as MGM treated it as a routine musical project during production.

The film was only a modest hit when it was first released. Today it is frequently cited as the greatest musical film and one of the greatest films ever made. It topped the AFI's Greatest Movie Musicals list, ranked as the fifth-greatest American motion picture of all time in its updated list of the greatest American films in 2007, having ranked as the tenth greatest in the original 1998 list, and Kelly's rendition of "Singin' in the Rain" ranked third in their list of the greatest film songs.

In 1989, Singin' in the Rain was one of the first 25 films selected by the United States Library of Congress for preservation in the National Film Registry for being "culturally, historically, or aesthetically significant". The film has undergone several major restorations, including one in 4K in 2012 for the film's 60th anniversary (Eagan, 2013).

In 2005, the British Film Institute included it in its list of the 50 films to be seen by the age of 14. In 2008, Empire magazine ranked it as the eighth-best film of all time. In Sight & Sound magazine's 2022 list of the greatest films of all time, Singin' in the Rain placed 10th. Previously, it had ranked third in their 1982 list and tenth in their 2002 list.

== Plot ==
In 1927, silent film stars Don Lockwood and Lina Lamont attend the premiere of their latest film, The Royal Rascal, produced by Hollywood studio Monumental Pictures. On the red carpet, Don tells the story of his rise to stardom, claiming to have grown up cultured and highly educated. His words are contradicted by flashbacks showing his humble roots as a hoofer, vaudeville musician and stuntman alongside his childhood best friend and longtime collaborator Cosmo Brown, accompanied by the song "Fit as a Fiddle". Don also expresses his admiration for Lina, feeding rumors of a secret romance between them. In reality, the rumors are a publicity stunt and Don barely tolerates Lina, although she believes that he loves her.

After the premiere, Don is mobbed by fans and escapes by jumping into a passing car driven by Kathy Selden. Kathy reluctantly gives Don a lift. She claims to be a theatre actress and expresses disdain for film acting, particularly Don's hammy performances. Don responds by mocking her acting aspirations, and they part on bad terms.

Don arrives at the afterparty, where Monumental Pictures' CEO R. F. Simpson shows a demonstration of a talking picture, (Note: This scene pays homage to the original 1921 DeForest Phonofilm demonstration, featuring DeForest explaining the system.) though his guests dismiss it as a fad. A group of chorus girls then performs, Kathy among them ("All I Do is Dream of You"). Furious at Don's teasing, Kathy attempts to throw a cake at him, but he dodges it and it hits Lina instead. In the confusion, Kathy runs away.

Three weeks later, Don has searched unsuccessfully for Kathy. Cosmo tries to cheer Don up ("Make 'Em Laugh"). Lina reveals that she had Kathy fired, infuriating Don. Cosmo finds Kathy working as an extra in another Monumental Pictures film ("Beautiful Girl"). Kathy admits to actually being a fan of Don's, while Don professes his love for her ("You Were Meant for Me").

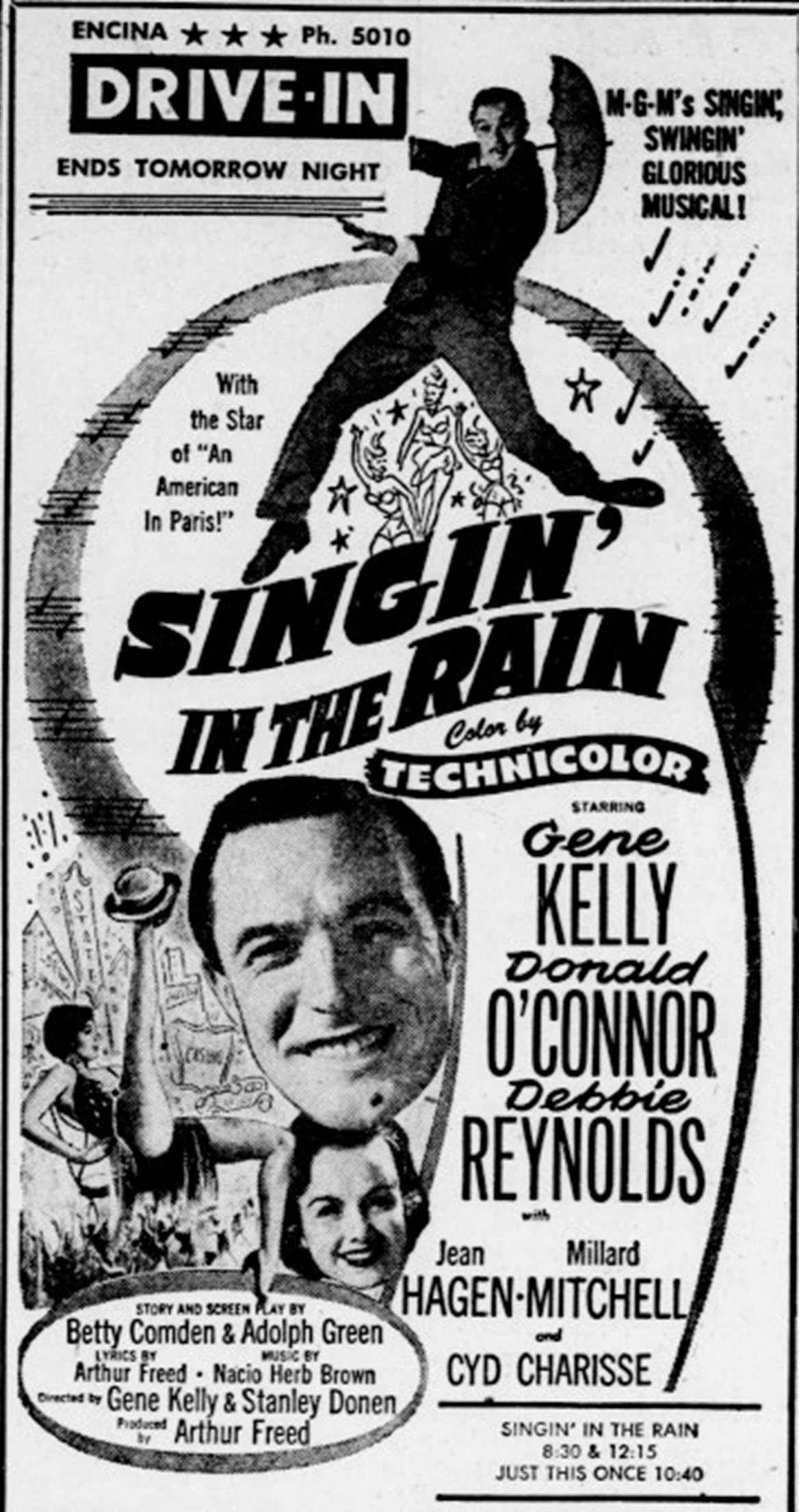
A drive-in advertisement from 1952

When Warner Bros. releases its first talking picture, The Jazz Singer, and it becomes an enormous hit, R. F. decides he has to convert the next Lockwood and Lamont film, The Dueling Cavalier, into a talkie. Lina and Don take elocution lessons ("Moses Supposes"), but the production is beset with difficulties, most notably Lina's grating, high-pitched voice and unfamiliarity with the new recording technology, which leads to numerous situations that drive director Roscoe Dexter to tears. The film's preview screening is a failure due to multiple complications, including awkward microphone placements, Don's uninspired improvising (Note: This is a reference to a scene by John Gilbert in his first talkie, His Glorious Night.) and the audio going out of synchronization.

Later that night, Kathy and Cosmo suggest The Dueling Cavalier be turned into a musical ("Good Morning"), and Cosmo, inspired by the film's synchronization error, suggests that Kathy dub Lina's voice. Don happily agrees, then takes Kathy home and dances through her neighborhood in the rain ("Singin' in the Rain"). Don and Cosmo pitch their idea to R. F., changing the title of the film to The Dancing Cavalier and adding a modern framing device ("Broadway Melody"). R. F. approves but tells them not to inform Lina of Kathy's involvement.

Don helps Kathy dub Lina's lines ("Would You"), but Lina is tipped off by another actress. When Lina realizes that Don and Kathy are in love and learns that R. F. intends to give Kathy a screen credit for her dubbing, she gives interviews across Hollywood promoting her (non-existent) vocal talent. A clause in Lina's contract allows her to sue the studio for negative press, so R. F. is forced to leave Kathy uncredited and agree to Lina's demand that Kathy continue anonymously dubbing for her.

The premiere of The Dancing Cavalier is a success, but when the audience clamors for Lina to sing live, Don, Cosmo, and R. F. tell her to lip sync into a microphone while Kathy, concealed behind the curtain, sings into a second microphone. While Lina is "singing" ("Singin' in the Rain Reprise"), the men raise the curtain, revealing the ruse. Lina and Kathy both flee in embarrassment, but Don has the audience stop Kathy and proudly announces that she is "the real star of the picture" ("You Are My Lucky Star"). Some time later, Kathy and Don kiss in front of a billboard for their new film, Singin' in the Rain.

== Cast ==
- Gene Kelly as Donald "Don" Lockwood
- Donald O'Connor as Cosmo Brown
- Debbie Reynolds as Kathy Selden
- Jean Hagen as Lina Lamont. Fresh from her role in The Asphalt Jungle, Hagen won the role reading for the part for producer Arthur Freed, doing a dead-on impression of Billie Dawn, Judy Holliday's character from Born Yesterday.
- Millard Mitchell as R. F. Simpson. The initials of the fictional head of Monumental Pictures are a reference to producer Arthur Freed, who is further emulated by the use of one of his favorite expressions when R. F. says of the "Broadway Melody" sequence that he "cannot quite visualize it”.
- Cyd Charisse as the woman in the green sequined dress and hair in the style of Louise Brooks as well as in a white dress and long wind-blown train, who vamps Gene Kelly in the "Broadway Melody" sequence
- Douglas Fowley as Roscoe Dexter, the director of Don and Lina's films
- Rita Moreno as Zelda Zanders, the "Zip Girl" and Lina's friend. As of July 2026, Moreno is the last surviving credited star from the film.

Uncredited

- Dawn Addams as "Teresa", a lady-in-waiting to Lina's character in The Duelling Cavalier
- Madge Blake as Dora Bailey, a Hollywood gossip columnist based on Louella Parsons
- Mae Clarke as the hairdresser who puts the finishing touches on Lina Lamont's hairdo
- John Dodsworth as "Baron de la Bonnet de la Toulon", the new husband of Olga Mara.
- King Donovan as Rod, head of the publicity department at Monumental Pictures
- Tommy Farrell as Sid Phillips, the director of the movie featuring "Beautiful Girl"
- Kathleen Freeman as Phoebe Dinsmore, Lina's diction coach
- Stuart Holmes as J. Cumberland Spendrill III, famed flapper Zelda Zanders' current love interest and escort to the premiere of The Royal Rascal
- Judy Landon as Olga Mara, a silent screen vamp who attends the premiere of The Royal Rascal
- Betty Noyes as the singing voice of Debbie Reynolds on "Would You" and "You Are My Lucky Star"
- Julius Tannen as the man demonstrating the technology of talking pictures
- Jimmy Thompson as the singer of "Beautiful Girl"
- Bobby Watson as Don's diction coach during the "Moses Supposes" number

== Songs ==
Singin' in the Rain was originally conceived by MGM producer Arthur Freed, the head of the "Freed Unit" responsible for turning out MGM's lavish musicals, as a vehicle for his catalog of songs written with Nacio Herb Brown for previous MGM musical films of the 1929–39 period. Screenwriters Betty Comden and Adolph Green wrote one entirely new song, "Moses Supposes", with music director Roger Edens providing the music (see below). Freed and Brown wrote a new song for the movie, "Make 'Em Laugh", though it bears a striking resemblance to Cole Porter's "Be a Clown" from another MGM Freed-produced musical, The Pirate (1948). Donen, who had asked the pair to write a song inspired by "Be a Clown", considered the result to be "100% plagiarism". However, Porter never sued for copyright infringement.

All songs have lyrics by Freed and music by Brown unless otherwise indicated. Some of the songs, such as "Broadway Rhythm", "You Are My Lucky Star", "Should I?", and especially "Singin' in the Rain" itself, had been featured in prior films. The films listed below mark the first time each song was presented on screen.

- "Fit as a Fiddle (And Ready for Love)", originally published in 1932 with music by Al Hoffman and Al Goodhart, lyrics by Freed.
- "Temptation" (instrumental only) from Going Hollywood (1933).
- "All I Do Is Dream of You" from Sadie McKee (1934). The arrangement in "Singin' in the Rain" is an uptempo, upbeat, "flapper" version of the song with full instrumentation. In contrast, the "Sadie McKee" version is slower tempo, and appears routinely throughout the film as a love ballad accompanied by a solo ukulele. An instrumental only version with full orchestration is also part of the film's opening and closing theme. An instrumental version was also played on the piano by Chico Marx in the 1935 Marx Brothers film A Night at the Opera.
- "Singin' in the Rain" from The Hollywood Revue of 1929 (1929). Kelly's performance in the song is now considered iconic.
- "Make 'Em Laugh"
- "Beautiful Girl Montage" comprising "I've Got a Feelin' You're Foolin'" from Broadway Melody of 1936 (1935), "The Wedding of the Painted Doll" from The Broadway Melody (1929), "Should I?" from Lord Byron of Broadway (1930) and "Beautiful Girl" from Stage Mother (1933)
- "You Were Meant for Me" from The Broadway Melody (1929)
- "You Are My Lucky Star" from Broadway Melody of 1936 (1935)
- "Moses Supposes" (music by Roger Edens, lyrics by Comden and Green), from a 1944 version based on the tongue-twister with the same title.
- "Good Morning" from Babes in Arms (1939)
- "Would You?" from San Francisco (1936)
- "Broadway Melody" composed of "The Broadway Melody" from The Broadway Melody (1929) and "Broadway Rhythm" from Broadway Melody of 1936 (1935). The music for the "Broadway Ballet" section is by Nacio Herb Brown.

== Production ==
=== History ===
Arthur Freed, the head of the "Freed Unit" at MGM responsible for the studio's glossy and glamorous musicals, conceived the idea of a movie based on the back catalog of songs written by himself and Nacio Herb Brown, and called in Betty Comden and Adolph Green from New York to come up with a story to tie the songs together and to write the script. Comden and Green first refused the assignment, as their agent had assured them that their new contract with MGM called for them to write the lyrics to all songs unless the score was by Irving Berlin, Cole Porter, or Rodgers and Hammerstein. After a two-week hold-out, their new agent, Irving "Swifty" Lazar, having looked over the contract, told them that the clause had been entirely an invention of their previous agent, and that there was no such language in the contract. After hearing this, Comden and Green began working on the story and script.

Because many of the songs had originally been written during the time when silent films were giving way to "talkies" and musicals were popular with audiences, Comden and Green came up with the idea that the story should be set during that transitional period in Hollywood, an era they were intimately familiar with. When Howard Keel was mentioned as the possible lead, they tried to work up a story involving a star of Western films who makes a comeback as a singing cowboy, but they kept gravitating to a story about a swashbuckling romantic hero with a vaudeville background who survives the transition by falling back on his abilities as a song-and-dance man, a story which Gene Kelly was well suited for.

Kelly could not be approached at the time, as he was deeply immersed in An American in Paris (1951), which he was co-choreographing with Stanley Donen, and in which he was starring. Comden and Green continued to work on the script, and had at that time three possible openings for the film: a silent movie premiere, a magazine interview with a Hollywood star, and a star-meets-girl, star-loses-girl sequence. Unable to decide which to use or how to proceed, they had just decided to return their advance to MGM and admit defeat, when Betty Comden's husband arrived from New York and suggested that they combine all three openings into one. The script with the re-written opening was approved by Freed and by MGM's head of production Dore Schary, who had recently replaced Louis B. Mayer.

By this time shooting on An American in Paris had completed, and Freed suggested that Kelly be given the script to read. Kelly and Donen responded enthusiastically, and immediately became involved in re-writes and adjustments to the script. Comden, Green, Kelly, and Donen were all old friends, and the process went smoothly. Besides the Freed-Brown songs, Comden and Green contributed the lyrics to "Moses Supposes", which was set to music by Roger Edens. Shortly before shooting began, "The Wedding of the Painted Doll", which Comden and Green had "painfully wedged into the script as a cheering-up song" was replaced with a new Freed/Brown song, "Make 'Em Laugh", which bore a remarkable resemblance to Cole Porter's 1948 song "Be a Clown".

After Comden and Green had returned to New York to work on other projects, they received word that a new song was needed for a love-song sequence between Kelly and Debbie Reynolds. The original had been a song-and-dance medley involving different sets in different soundstages on the studio lot, but they were asked for a romantic love song set in an empty sound stage, and it was needed immediately. Comden and Green provided such a scene for "You Were Meant for Me" and sent it off to Hollywood.

In a later interview, Stanley Donen described Singin' in the Rain as part of the Astaire-Rogers tradition, in which dance is used to help develop the central couple's relationship.

=== Revisions from early drafts ===
Trailer

- In an early draft of the script, the musical number "Singin' in the Rain" was to be sung by Reynolds, O'Connor, and Kelly, emerging from a restaurant after the flop preview of The Dueling Cavalier, to celebrate the idea of changing the film into a musical.
- Kelly's singing "You Were Meant For Me" to Reynolds on an empty sound stage was not included in that draft. The number was originally conceived as Kelly's singing a medley of other songs to her as they romped around various studio back lot sets.
- Rita Moreno was originally to have sung the lead in "I've Got a Feelin' You're Foolin'" with other showgirls, but this ended up as part of the "Beautiful Girl Montage" without her.

=== Scenes filmed but cut before release ===
- Gene Kelly sang a reprise of "All I Do Is Dream of You" after the party at R. F. Simpson's house when Kelly chases after Reynolds. The song, ending in Kelly's bedroom, was cut from the release version after two previews, and the footage has been lost.
- Reynolds's solo rendition of "You Are My Lucky Star" (to a billboard showing an image of Lockwood) was cut after previews. This number has survived and is included on the original soundtrack and DVD version of the film. It also was used in the retrospective film That's Entertainment III.
- In the steamy "Vamp Dance" segment of the "Broadway Melody Ballet" with Cyd Charisse and Gene Kelly, reviewers from both the Production Code and the Catholic Legion of Decency objected to a brief, suggestive pose or movement between the dancers. Although there is no precise documentation of what or where it was, close examination of footage toward the end of the dance shows an abrupt and noticeable cut to both visual and audio when Charisse is wrapped around Kelly, indicating the probable location.

=== Other notes ===
Reynolds's singing in two songs was dubbed by Betty Noyes, one of them when Kathy is shown dubbing Lina Lamont, while her high notes and taps were dubbed in the entire film. Although the film revolves around the idea that Kathy has to dub for Lina's piercing voice, in the scene where Kathy is portrayed recording a line of Lina's dialogue during the movie within a movie The Dancing Cavalier, Hagen's normal voice was used, because it was preferred over Reynolds'. Donen once explained that Reynolds' "mid-western" accent was not right for this one scene, preferring Hagen's natural, cultured speaking voice.

In the sequence in which Gene Kelly dances and sings the title song while spinning an umbrella, splashing through puddles and getting soaked with rain, Kelly was sick with a 103 °F (39 °C) fever. The water used in the scene caused Kelly's wool suit to shrink during filming. A common myth is that Kelly managed to perform the entire song in one take, thanks to cameras placed at predetermined locations. However, this was not the case; filming the sequence took two to three days. Another myth is that the rain was mixed with milk in order for the drops to show up better on camera; but the desired visual effect was produced, albeit with difficulty, through backlighting.

Debbie Reynolds was not a dancer when she made Singin' in the Rain; her background was as a gymnast. Kelly apparently insulted her for her lack of dance experience, which upset her. Later, when Fred Astaire was in the studio, he found her crying under a piano. On hearing what had happened, Astaire let her watch one of his rehearsals to show her that dancing is very hard work even for professionals, but hard work is necessary, and in the end, worth it. Kelly later admitted that he had not been kind to Reynolds and was surprised that she was still willing to talk to him afterwards. After shooting the "Good Morning" routine, which had taken from 8:00 a.m. until 11:00 p.m. to shoot, Reynolds' feet were bleeding. Years later, she said, "Singin' in the Rain and childbirth were the two hardest things I ever had to do in my life."

Donald O'Connor, a four-pack-a-day smoker at the time, had to stay in bed in the hospital for several days after filming the "Moses Supposes" sequence.

Kelly and O'Connor created "Make 'Em Laugh" using comic routines O'Connor had performed during his vaudeville career.

Most of the costumes from this film were eventually acquired by Reynolds and became part of her vast collection of original film costumes, sets, and props. Many of these items were sold at a 2011 auction in Hollywood. While most were sold to private collectors, Donald O'Connor's green check "Fit As a Fiddle" suit and shoes were purchased by Costume World, Inc. They are now on permanent display at the Costume World Broadway Collection Museum in Pompano Beach, Florida.

== Reception ==
According to MGM records, during the film's initial theatrical release, it made $3.263 million in the US and Canada, and $2.367 million internationally, earning the studio a net profit of $666,000. It was the tenth-highest-grossing movie of the year in the US and Canada.

=== Critical response ===
Bosley Crowther of The New York Times wrote: "Compounded generously of music, dance, color spectacle and a riotous abundance of Gene Kelly, Jean Hagen and Donald O'Connor on the screen, all elements in this rainbow program are carefully contrived and guaranteed to lift the dolors of winter and put you in a buttercup mood." Variety was also positive, writing: "Arthur Freed has produced another surefire grosser for Metro in Singin' in the Rain. Musical has pace, humor, and good spirits a-plenty, in a breezy, good-natured spoof at the film industry itself ... Standout performances by Gene Kelly and Donald O'Connor, especially the latter, enhance the film's pull."

Harrison's Reports called it "top-notch entertainment in every department—music, dancing, singing, staging and story". Richard L. Coe of The Washington Post called it "yet another fresh and breezy, colorful and funny musical" from Gene Kelly, adding, "Of the players there's not a dud in the lot, from Kelly's facile performing to the brief but electric dance appearance by Cyd Charisse, a swell partner for him."

Pauline Kael, the long-time film critic for The New Yorker, praised the film: "This exuberant and malicious satire of Hollywood in the late 20s...is probably the most enjoyable of all American movie musicals. The teamwork of the stars, Gene Kelly, Donald O'Connor, and Debbie Reynolds, is joyful and the material is first-rate..." Roger Ebert placed Singin' in the Rain on his Great Movies list, calling the film "a transcendent experience, and no one who loves movies can afford to miss it." Leslie Halliwell gave it four of four stars, stating: "Brilliant comic musical, the best picture by far of Hollywood in transition, with the catchiest tunes, the liveliest choreography, the most engaging performances and the most hilarious jokes of any musical."

On review aggregator Rotten Tomatoes, the film has a perfect 100% approval rating based on 64 reviews, with an average rating of 9.3/10. The website's critical consensus reads: "Clever, incisive, and funny, Singin' In The Rain is a masterpiece of the classical Hollywood musical." On Metacritic, it has a weighted average score of 99 out of 100, based on 17 critics, indicating "universal acclaim". The film made each site's list of best-rated films, ranked 46th on Rotten Tomatoes (as of 2021) and 15th on Metacritic.

=== Admiration in the film industry ===
Betty Comden and Adolph Green report that when they met François Truffaut at a party in Paris, Truffaut was very excited to meet the authors of Chantons Sous la Pluie (as Singin' in the Rain was titled in French). He told them that he had seen the film so many times that he knew it frame by frame, and that he and fellow director and screenwriter Alain Resnais, among others, went to see it regularly at a small Parisian movie theatre where it sometimes ran for months at a time.

== Analysis ==
Film scholar Peter N. Chumo II argues that the film presents physical performance as an advantage during Hollywood's conversion to sound. Characters who are comfortable with music, dance, and physical comedy are positioned to prosper in the changing industry, while those unable to leave behind silent-film performance are not. Don, Cosmo, and Kathy represent the first group, and Lina Lamont represents the latter.

Music scholar Stephan Prock, meanwhile, argues that the film gives Don more musical self-expression and authority than Kathy despite them being presented as equals. In the completed film, Kathy is never given an independent musical number, unlike Don's "Singin' in the Rain" performance, and the dubbing of Reynolds in two songs further complicates the film's presentation of her talent.

== Accolades ==
Award	Category	Nominee(s)	Result	Ref.
Academy Awards	Best Supporting Actress	Jean Hagen	Nominated	
Academy Awards	Best Scoring of a Musical Picture	Lennie Hayton	Nominated	
British Academy Film Awards	Best Film from any Source		Nominated	
Directors Guild of America Awards	Outstanding Directorial Achievement in Motion Pictures	Gene Kelly and Stanley Donen	Nominated	
DVD Exclusive Awards	Best Overall New Extra Features, Library Release	Singin' in the Rain: 50th Anniversary Edition	Nominated	
DVD Exclusive Awards	Original Retrospective Documentary, Library Release	Musicals Great Musicals: The Arthur Freed Unit at MGM	Nominated	
Golden Globe Awards	Best Motion Picture – Musical or Comedy		Nominated	
Golden Globe Awards	Best Actor in a Motion Picture – Musical or Comedy	Donald O'Connor	Won	
National Board of Review Awards	Top Ten Films		8th place	
National Film Preservation Board	National Film Registry		Inducted	
Online Film & Television Association Awards	Film Hall of Fame: Productions		Inducted	
Online Film & Television Association Awards	Film Hall of Fame: Songs	"Singin' in the Rain"	Inducted	
Photoplay Awards	Best Performances of the Month (June)	Gene Kelly, Donald O'Connor, and Jean Hagen	Won	
Satellite Awards	Outstanding Youth DVD		Nominated	
Satellite Awards	Best DVD Extras		Nominated	
Writers Guild of America Awards	Best Written American Musical	Betty Comden and Adolph Green	Won	

The film is recognized by the American Film Institute in these lists:

- 1998: AFI's 100 Years...100 Movies – #10
- 2000: AFI's 100 Years...100 Laughs – #16
- 2002: AFI's 100 Years...100 Passions – #16
- 2003: AFI's 100 Years...100 Heroes & Villains:
  - Lina Lamont – Nominated Villain
- 2004: AFI's 100 Years...100 Songs:
  - "Singin' in the Rain" – #3
  - "Make 'Em Laugh" – #49
  - "Good Morning" – #72
- 2005: AFI's 100 Years...100 Movie Quotes:
  - Lina Lamont: "What do they think I am, dumb or something? Why, I make more money than Calvin Coolidge! Put together!" – Nominated
- 2006: AFI's Greatest Movie Musicals – #1
- 2007: AFI's 100 Years...100 Movies (10th Anniversary Edition) – #5

In 1989, Singin' in the Rain was among the first 25 films chosen for the newly established National Film Registry for films that are deemed "culturally, historically or aesthetically significant" by the United States Library of Congress and selected for preservation.

Singin' in the Rain has appeared three times on Sight & Sound's list of the ten best films of all time, in 1982, 2002 and 2022. Its position in 1982 was at number 3 on the critics list; on the 2002 critics' list, it was listed as number 10, and it tied for 19 on the directors' list; on the 2022 critics' list, it was listed again as number 10. In 2006, Writers Guild of America West ranked its screenplay 65th in WGA’s list of 101 Greatest Screenplays. In 2008, Singin' in the Rain was placed on Empire's 500 Greatest Movies of All Time List, ranking at #8, the highest-ranked G-rated movie on the list.

== Home media ==
The 40th Anniversary Edition VHS version released in 1992 include a documentary, the original trailer, and Reynolds' solo rendition of "You Are My Lucky Star", which had been cut from the final film.

According to the audio commentary on the 2002 Special Edition DVD, the original negative was destroyed in a fire. Despite this, the film was digitally restored for its DVD release. A Blu-ray Ultimate Collector's Edition was released in July 2012, featuring the high-definition digital transfer sourced from the 4K transfer. A Ultra HD Blu-ray was released on April 26, 2022.

The digital version of the film is currently available to stream on HBO Max.

== Adaptations ==
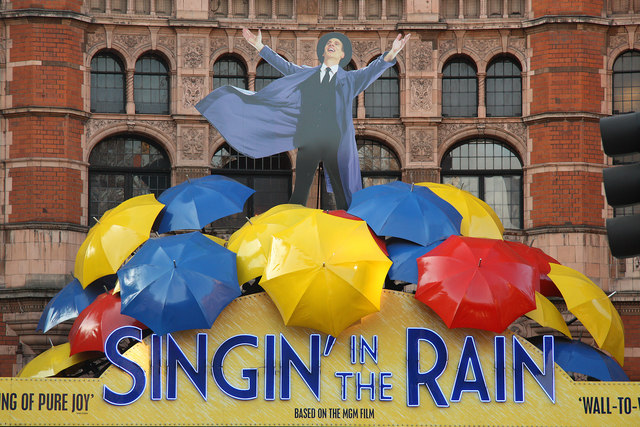
Singin' in the Rain playing at the Palace Theatre in London's West End, December 2012

The musical Singin' in the Rain was adapted from the motion picture, and the plot of the stage version closely adheres to the original. Directed and choreographed by post-modern choreographer Twyla Tharp, the opening night cast at the London Palladium in 1983 starred Don Correia as Don Lockwood, Mary D'Arcy as Kathy Selden, Richard Fancy as Roscoe Dexter, Faye Grant as Lina Lamont, and Peter Slutsker as Cosmo Brown. The musical opened on July 2, 1985, at the Gershwin Theatre after 39 previews, and ran for 367 performances, closing on May 18, 1986.

A comic book adaptation was published as Eastern Color Movie Love #14 (April 1952).

== In popular culture ==
- Kelly's hometown Pittsburgh Pirates games at PNC Park play the scene from the film during rain delays.
- 1979 – In Alien, Sigourney Weaver's main character Ellen Ripley quietly sings parts of "You Are My Lucky Star" to herself while hiding from and preparing to fight the eponymous antagonist.
- 1983 – In the television special Paddington Goes to the Movies, Paddington Bear performs a version of Gene Kelly's famous dance from the film.
- 2005 – The dance to the title song is parodied in the Monty Python Broadway musical Spamalot in the dance break to "Always Look on the Bright Side of Life", complete with tap-dancing knights spinning bright-yellow umbrellas around.
- 2010 – Two songs from the film were featured in "The Substitute", a second-season episode of the musical comedy television series Glee.
- 2012 – In the film Silver Linings Playbook, Jennifer Lawrence's character is inspired by a clip of Donald O'Connor and Gene Kelly dancing to "Moses Supposes" from Singin' in the Rain.
- 2013 – The anime short Gisoku no Moses features a young female ghost dancing with a pair of haunted dance shoes to the tune of "Moses Supposes".
- 2015 – In the romantic drama film Brooklyn, Tony Fiorello (Emory Cohen) takes Eilis Lacey (Saoirse Ronan) out on a date to see the film. In the next scene, he emulates Gene Kelly's iconic swinging on the lamppost.
- 2015 – The scene in which Gene Kelly sings "You Were Meant for Me" is featured in the Nancy Meyers film The Intern.
- 2015 – Tropicana Products used Singin' in the Rain in their commercial throughout 2015 advertising their orange juice.
- 2016 – Singin' in the Rain was an inspiration for the musical film La La Land, directed by Damien Chazelle.
- 2017 – On Lip Sync Battle, Tom Holland opened his performance against Zendaya with a lip-sync to "Singin' in the Rain" before transitioning into Rihanna's "Umbrella".
- 2017 – The song "Good Morning" was featured in the third-season Legends of Tomorrow episode "Phone Home".
- 2022 – The plot lines closely resembling Singin' in the Rain are used in the feature film Downton Abbey: A New Era.
- 2022 – The plot and scenes from the film itself are referenced and depicted in the comedy-drama film Babylon, directed by Damien Chazelle.

== See also ==
- List of cult films
- List of films voted the best
- List of films with a 100% rating on Rotten Tomatoes, a film review aggregation website
- List of films featuring fictional films

== Bibliography ==
- Barrios, Richard (October 14, 2009). A Song in the Dark. Oxford University PressNew York. doi:10.1093/acprof:oso/9780195377347.001.0001. ISBN 978-0-19-537734-7.
- Goldmark, Daniel; Cohan, Steven; Dickinson, Kay (2004). "Hollywood Musicals, the Film Reader". American Music. 22 (1): 187. doi:10.2307/3592976. ISSN 0734-4392. JSTOR 3592976.
- "The talkies: American cinema's transition to sound, 1926-1931". Choice Reviews Online. 36 (1): 36–0220–36–0220. September 1, 1998. doi:10.5860/choice.36-0220 (inactive January 8, 2026). ISSN 0009-4978.
- "America's film legacy: the authoritative guide to the landmark movies in the National Film Registry". Choice Reviews Online. 47 (10): 47–5375-47-5375. June 1, 2010. doi:10.5860/choice.47-5375 (inactive January 8, 2026). ISSN 0009-4978.
- Maltby, Richard (January 1984). "The Hollywood Musical. By Jane Feuer. Bloomington, Ind.: Indiana University Press; London: Macmillan, in conjunction with the British Film Institute, 1982. 131 pp. - The Hollywood Musical Goes to War. By Allen L. Woll. Chicago: Nelson-Hall, 1983. 186 pp". Popular Music. 4: 333–337. doi:10.1017/s0261143000006346. ISSN 0261-1430.
- Comden, Betty & Green, Adolph (1972) "Introduction" Singin' in the Rain. New York: Viking. SBN 670-01946-1
- Hess, Earl J. & Dabholkar, Pratibha A. (2009). Singin' in the Rain: The Making of an American Masterpiece. Lawrence, Kansas: University Press of Kansas. ISBN 978-0-7006-1656-5.
