= Walter Whipple =

American missionary (born 1943)

Walter Whipple (born 1943) is a Teaching Professor Emeritus of Polish in the Department of Germanic and Slavic Languages of Brigham Young University (BYU) in Provo, Utah. From 1990 to 1993, Whipple served as the president of the Poland Warsaw Mission of the Church of Jesus Christ of Latter-day Saints (LDS Church).

Whipple is the author of numerous English translations of Polish poems, including works of Wisława Szymborska, Juliusz Słowacki, Cyprian Kamil Norwid, Bolesław Prus, Jan Brzechwa, Julian Tuwim, and Kazimierz Tetmajer.

As a young man, Whipple served as a Mormon missionary in Switzerland. He earned bachelor's and master's degrees from BYU and his DMA from the University of Southern California. From 1974 to 1990, he was a professor of music at Rockford College.

Whipple is a professional organist and amateur cellist. He has served as a member of the General Church Music Committee of the LDS Church. Walter Whipple served as organist at the Brigham Young University Jerusalem Center for Near Eastern Studies from May 2009 through August 2010.

== See also ==
- Polish literature
