= Theophilus Thistle =

English language tongue-twister

Theophilus Thistle is the title of a famous tongue-twister, of which there are multiple versions.

One version reads as:

Theophilus Thistle, the thistle sifter,
In sifting a sieve full of un-sifted thistles,
Thrust three thousand thistles through the thick of his thumb.
Now if Theophilus Thistle, the successful thistle sifter,
Thrust’s three thousand thistles through the thick of his thumb,
Then success to the successful thistle sifter.

While another version reads:

Theophilus Thistle, the successful Thistle sifter,
In sifting a sieve full of unsifted thistles,
Thrust three thousand thistles through the thick of his thumb.
If Theophilus Thistle, the successful thistle sifter,
In sifting a sieve full of unsifted thistles,
Thrust three thousand thistles through the thick of his thumb.
See that thou, in sifting a sieve full of unsifted thistles,
Thrust NOT three thousand thistles through the thick of THY thumb.
Success to the successful thistle sifter!

This tongue twister has been included in many tongue twister books and lessons, particularly in helping children and others with speech impediments to correctly pronounce the forward th and s sounds.

In the book Jeeves and the Feudal Spirit by P. G. Wodehouse, the character Bertram Wooster asked Jeeves to repeat a version of the tongue-twister in order to prove that he was not intoxicated:

… ‘Intoxicated?’ I said. ‘At ten in the morning? A laughable theory. But the matter can readily be put to the test. Jeeves, say “Theodore Oswaldtwistle, the thistle sifter, sifting a sack of thistles thrust three thorns through the thick of his thumb”.’
He did so with an intonation as clear as a bell, if not clearer.

A version of this tongue twister was used in a song called Theophilus Thistler by Australian dance music group Sonic Animation. Their variation of the tongue twister is as follows:

Theophilus Thistler,
The thistle sifter,
In sifting a sieve full of un-sifted thistles,
Thrust three thousand thistles through the thick of his thumb,
Three thousand thistles.
