= Announcer's test =

Test required in some places for broadcasters

An announcer's test is a test sometimes given to those wanting to be a radio or television announcer. The tests usually involve retention, memory, repetition, enunciation, diction, and using every letter in the alphabet a variety of times.

== History ==
=== Origins ===
Announcer's tests originated in the early days of radio broadcasting, around 1920. The tests involved the pronunciation of difficult words, as well as retention, memory, repetition, enunciation, diction, and using every letter in the alphabet a variety of times. An excerpt of one early test, forwarded from Phillips Carlin, who was known for co-announcing the 1926, 1927, and 1928 World Series with Graham McNamee, is:

Penelope Cholmondely raised her azure eyes from the crabbed scenario. She meandered among the congeries of her memoirs. There was the Kinetic Algernon, a choleric artificer of icons and triptychs, who wanted to write a trilogy. For years she had stifled her risibilities with dour moods. His asthma caused him to sough like the zephyrs among the tamarack.

In around 1930, CBS Radio established a school for announcers. The school was headed by Frank Vizetelly, who trained announcers to develop voices that were "clear, clean-cut, pleasant, and carry with them the additional charm of personal magnetism." At about the same time, NBC Radio published standard pronunciation guidelines for its sponsors. According to announcer André Baruch, NBC used to test potential announcers using copy filled with tongue-twisters and foreign names, such as:

The seething sea ceased to see, then thus sufficeth thus.

Another test for an announcer candidate might be to "describe the studio in which you are seated so that a listener can readily visualize it."

=== One hen, two ducks ===
One of the better-known tests originated at Radio Central New York in the early 1940s as a cold reading test given to prospective radio talent to demonstrate their speaking ability and breath control. Del Moore, a long-time friend of Jerry Lewis, took this test at Radio Central New York in 1941, and passed it on to him. Lewis performed this test on radio, television and stage for many years, and it has become a favorite tongue-twister (and memory challenge) for his fans around the world. Professional announcers would be asked to perform the entire speaking test within a single breath without sounding rushed or out of breath.

- One hen
- Two ducks
- Three squawking geese
- Four limerick oysters
- Five corpulent porpoises
- Six pairs of Don Alverzo's tweezers
- Seven thousand Macedonians in full battle array
- Eight brass monkeys from the ancient sacred crypts of Egypt
- Nine apathetic, sympathetic, diabetic old men on roller skates, with a marked propensity toward procrastination and sloth
- Ten lyrical, spherical, diabolical denizens of the deep who stall in the squall at the quoin of the quay all a quivvy, all at the same time.

There are many variations to this version, many having been passed from one person to another by word of mouth. One variant is known as the Tibetan Memory Trick and has been performed by Danny Kaye as well as Flo & Eddie of The Turtles. Flo and Eddie incorporated the trick into Frank Zappa's performance of Billy the Mountain in his performance at Carnegie Hall with the Mothers of Invention. It was also used by Boston's WBZ disc jockey Dick Summer in the 1960s as the Nightlighter's Password.

The test has also been adopted and adapted for use as a "repeat after me" chant by various Boy Scout units and camps, with several variations in the wording, some including an eleventh line: "Eleven neutramatic synthesizing systems owned by the seriously cybernetic marketing department, shipped via relativistic space flight through the draconian sector seven." This last line may have originated as a tribute to Douglas Adams and the Hitchhiker's Guide to the Galaxy books and has since been corrupted by the oral transmission of this script. The books include references to "Nutrimatic Drink Dispenser systems" owned by the "Sirius Cybernetics Corporation." In So Long, and Thanks for All the Fish, one character mentions, "This hedgehog, that chimney pot, the other pair of Don Alfonso's tweezers." A variant appears in the 1997 novel Matters of Chance by Jeannette Haien.

=== Classical radio announcer's audition ===
In the early 1950s, Mike Nichols wrote the following announcer's test for radio station WFMT in Chicago.

The WFMT announcer's lot is not a happy one. In addition to uttering the sibilant, mellifluous cadences of such cacophonous sounds as Hans Schmidt-Isserstedt, Carl Schuricht, Nicanor Zabaleta, Hans Knappertsbusch and the Hammerklavier Sonata, he must thread his vocal way through the complications of L'Orchestre de la Suisse Romande, the Concertgebouw Orchestra of Amsterdam, the Leipzig Gewandhaus Orchestra and other complicated nomenclature.

However, it must by no means be assumed that the ability to pronounce L'Orchestre de la Société des Concerts du Conservatoire de Paris with fluidity and verve outweighs an ease, naturalness and friendliness of delivery when at the omnipresent microphone. For example, when delivering a diatribe concerning Claudia Muzio, Beniamino Gigli, Hetty Plümacher, Giacinto Prandelli, Hilde Rössel-Majdan and Lina Pagliughi, five out of six is good enough if the sixth one is plausibly mispronounced. Jessica Dragonette and Margaret Truman are taken for granted.

Poets, although not such a constant annoyance as polysyllabically named singers, creep in now and then. Of course Dylan Thomas and W. B. Yeats are no great worry. Composers occur almost incessantly, and they range all the way from Albéniz, Alfvén and Auric through Wolf-Ferrari and Zeisl.

Let us reiterate that a warm, simple tone of voice is desirable, even when introducing the Bach Cantata "Ich hatte viel Bekümmernis," or Monteverdi's opera "L'Incoronazione di Poppea."

Such then, is the warp and woof of an announcer's existence "In diesen heil'gen Hallen."

== See also ==
- Voice acting
