= Jan Brzechwa =

Polish poet, author, and lawyer (1898–1966)

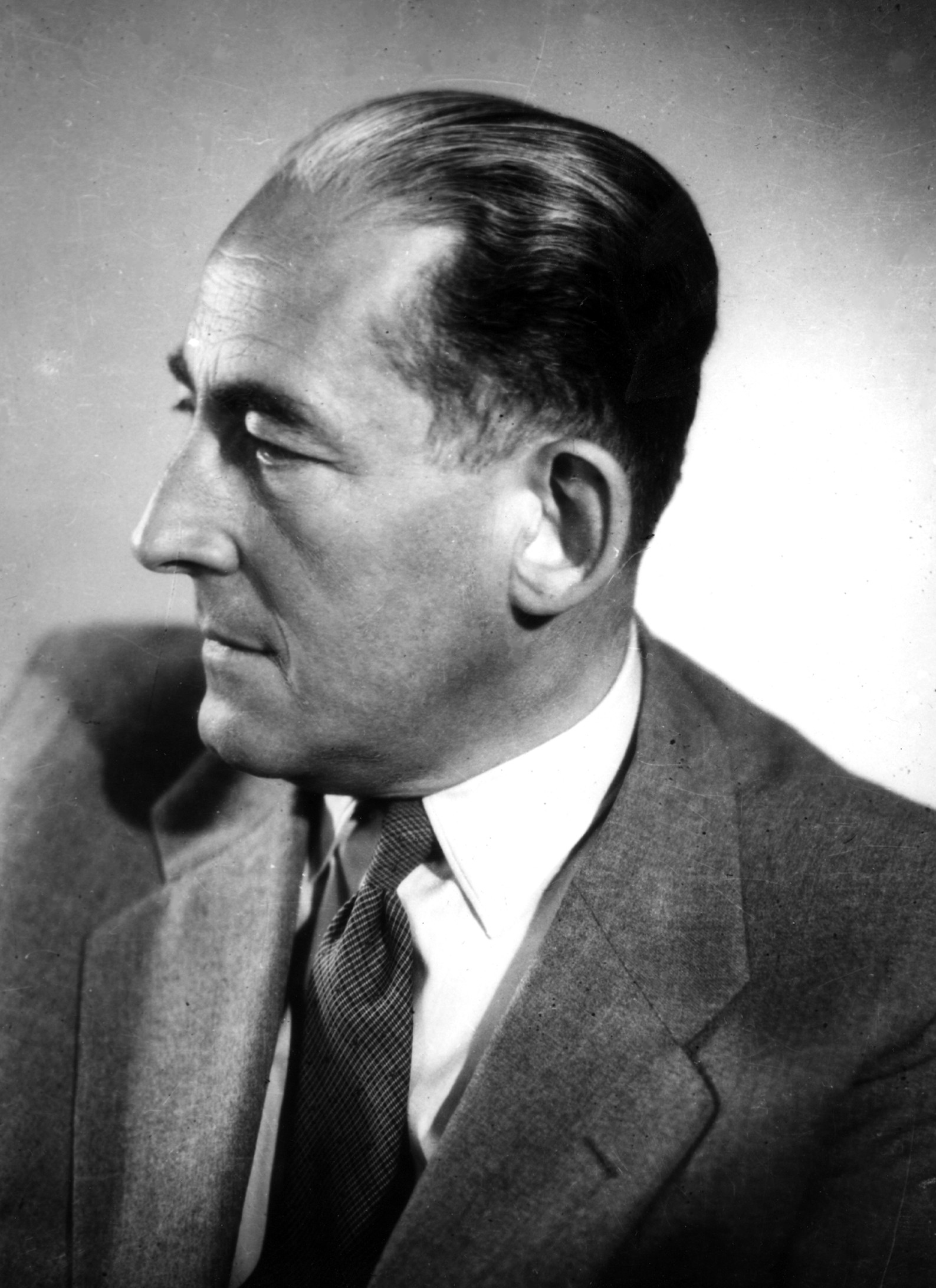
- Born: Jan Wiktor Lesman; 15 August 1898; Żmerynka, Podolia
- Died: 2 July 1966 (aged 67); Warsaw, Poland
- Resting place: Powązki Cemetery
- Occupations: Poet, author, lawyer
- Writing career
- Language: Polish
- Notable works: Tańcowała igła z nitką Akademia Pana Kleksa
- Notable awards: Medal of the 10th Anniversary of People's Poland

Jan Wiktor Brzechwa (Polish pronunciation: [ˈbʐɛxfa], né Lesman; 15 August 1898 – 2 July 1966) was a Polish poet, author and lawyer, known mostly for his contribution to children's literature.

== Early life ==
Brzechwa was born in Żmerynka, Podolia to a Polish family of Jewish descent. His father, Aleksandr Stanisław Lesman, was a railway engineer and his mother Michalina, née Lewicka, was a French teacher. Jan spent a lot of his childhood traveling around Poland's eastern regions ("Kresy") with his family. He lived in Kiev, then in Warsaw, and later in Saint Petersburg. In 1916–1918, he studied veterinary medicine in Kazan. In May 1918, he returned to Warsaw and began studying Polish literature at Warsaw University, where he remained until October 1918. During the Polish-Soviet War, he volunteered for the 36th Regiment of the Academic Infantry Legion, a unit composed of university students, and was decorated for his service. His formal writing debut took place in 1920 by way of various humor magazines. He worked as an attorney for the Society of Authors ZAiKS where he specialized in copyright law.

During World War II (just before its outbreak, he lived in Warsaw at 35 Żurawia Street), he avoided deportation to a ghetto or extermination camp, even though he was not in hiding; at the time, he was a farm worker on a farm in Służewiec.

This period marked one of the most important periods Brzechwa's work – he wrote works such as "The Academy of Mr. Kleks" and "Mr. Drops and His Troop," among others. He wrote two books continuing "The Academy..." ("The Travels of Mr. Kleks" and "The Triumph of Mr. Kleks") in 1961 and 1965, respectively.

Brzechwa was friends with graphic artist Jan Marcin Szancer, who provided numerous illustrations for his texts. In the 1950s, he wrote socialist realist style poems containing propaganda glorifying the ruling Polish United Workers' Party (to which he himself was not a member) and the socialist system (e.g., "The March," "The Voice of America"). In later years, he remained politically neutral, being considered a passive opponent of the regime. In 1964, he signed the Letter of the Polish Writers Against the Letter of 34, protesting against "the organized campaign in the Western press and on the airwaves of the subversive Radio Free Europe, slandering the Polish People's Republic."

Brzechwa was a cousin of another famous Polish poet, Bolesław Leśmian. He was married three times; first to Maria Sunderland, his first cousin once removed and a niece of the renowned Polish artist Celina Sunderland, then to Karolina Lentowa (née Meyer), and finally to Janina Magajewska (1915–1989). His daughter from his first marriage, Krystyna (born 1928), is a painter.

== Literary output ==
Jan Brzechwa was the writer's pseudonym. The name Brzechwa translates into 'fletching' (the tail section of an arrow). His poetry was written mostly in the melodic style of the 8-syllable accentual verse, the most popular rhythmic structure among the Polish stylistic variations.

In 1926 he published Oblicza zmyślone ("Imaginary visages"), his first book of poems. His first set of poems for children Tańcowała igła z nitką ("Danced the needle with the thread") was published in 1937. Among his most popular works is Chrząszcz (The Beetle), a poem proverbial for containing one the hardest-to-pronounce phrases in Polish literature. Its first line "W Szczebrzeszynie chrząszcz brzmi w trzcinie" (In the town of Szczebrzeszyn a beetle buzzes in the reeds) is the best known Polish tongue-twister, in which almost all of the consonants make distinct buzzing sounds. Brzechwa is also popular in Poland for having written a number of lyrical children's poems. He was a translator of Russian literature, translating works by Aleksandr Pushkin, Sergey Yesienin and Vladimir Mayakovskiy.

Brzechwa also wrote a long-running series of children's books based on the adventures of Pan Kleks, the headmaster of a magical academy, and his students. Many of the Kleks books and plot points were made into a series of films in the 1980s, while the poem Pchła Szachrajka (Adventures of a Cheating Flea) was developed into an animated film in 1989.

Many of Brzechwa's texts have been translated into English by Walter Whipple, but as of 2004 they have yet to be published. Brzechwa died in Warsaw on 2 July 1966 and is buried at the Powązki Cemetery, the most famous cemetery in the city.

== Works ==
- 1926 – Oblicza zmyślone
- 1937 – Tańcowała igła z nitką
- 1938 – Kaczka Dziwaczka
- 1946 – Akademia Pana Kleksa
- 1946 – Ptasie plotki
- 1946 – Pan Drops i jego trupa
- 1948 – Na wyspach Bergamutach
- 1948 – Opowiedział dzięcioł sowie
- 1948 – Przygody rycerza Szaławiły
- 1951 – Uczymy się chodzić
- 1953 – Teatr Pietruszki
- 1953 – Wagary
- 1957 – Magik
- 1958 – Wyssane z palca
- 1958 – Sto bajek
- 1961 – Podróże pana Kleksa
- 1964 – Śmiechu warte
- 1965 – Od baśni do baśni
- 1965 – Tryumf pana Kleksa

== See also ==
- List of Polish language poets
- Polish literature
