= List of allusions to Carlyle in literature =

This article lists parodies of and references to Thomas Carlyle in literature.

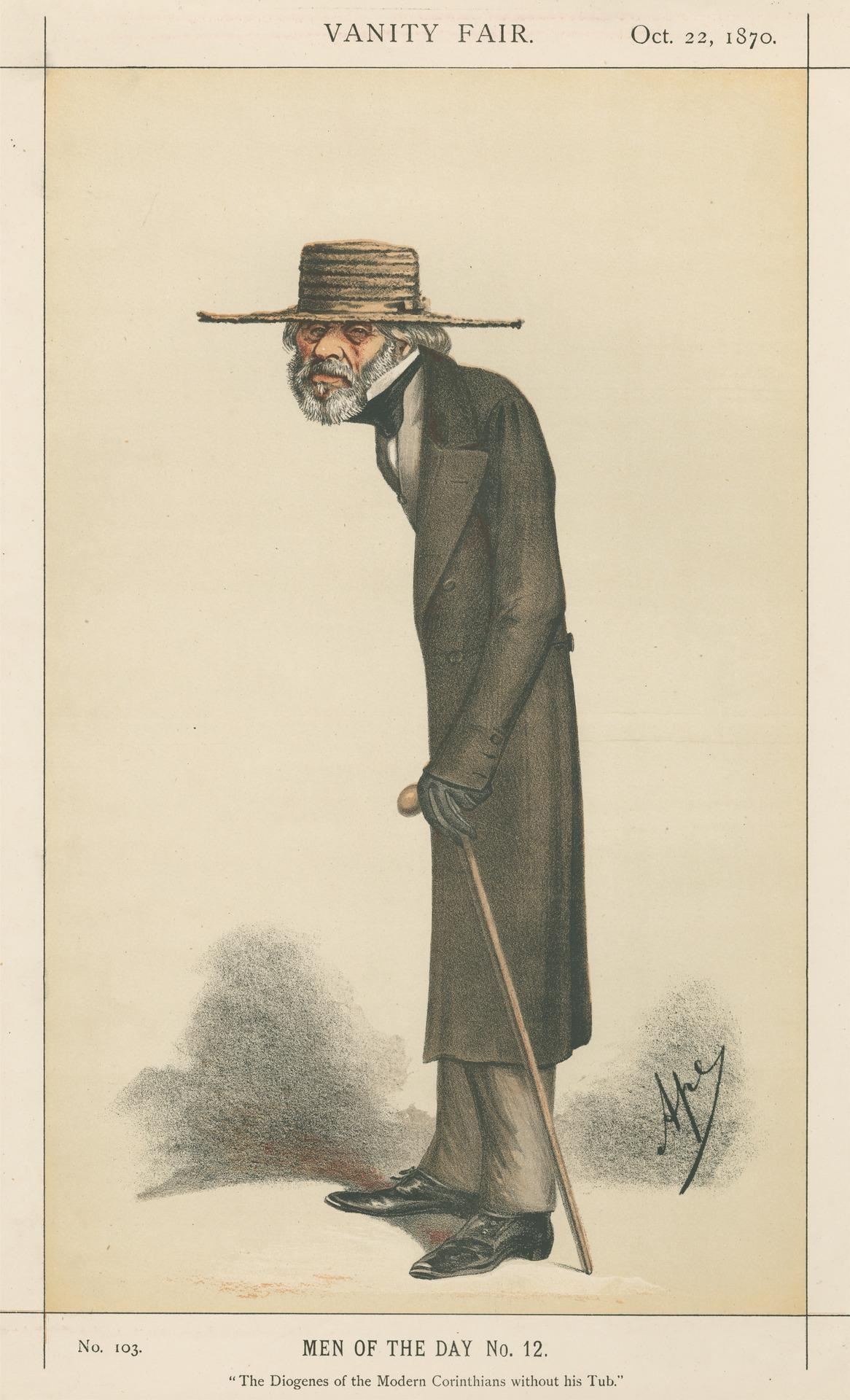
Caricature of Carlyle by Carlo Pellegrini in Vanity Fair

== Parodies of Carlyle ==
- William Maginn parodied Carlyle in the "Gallery of Literary Characters" Number 37, appearing in Fraser's Magazine for June 1833.
- In January 1838 Benjamin Disraeli published a series of political letters in the Times under the heading of Old England and signed Couer de Lion, which imitated Carlyle's style.
- James Russell Lowell's The Biglow Papers of 1848 features a "notice" from the fictitious World-Harmonic-Æolian-Attachment in parody of Carlyle.
- Fraser's again parodied Carlyle in November 1849, this time by Charles Henry Waring.
- Carlyle received two parodic treatments in Punch shortly after the publication of the Latter-Day Pamphlets in 1850.
- Edward FitzGerald referred to Carlyle in Euphranor (1851) and Polonius (1852), his first published works.
- Anthony Trollope parodied Carlyle in chapter 15 of The Warden (1855) in the figure of Dr. Pessimist Anticant.
- Scottish author and businessman Patrick Proctor Alexander published "An Occasional Discourse on Sauerteig" (1859), attributed to Smelfungus.
- David Atwood Wasson parodied Carlyle in 1863 in a "strongly critical rejoinder" to "Ilias (Americana) in Nuce".
- Frederic Harrison wrote "A New Lecture on Hero-Worship" in 1867, attacking Carlyle's support of Governor Eyre.
- Mark Twain wrote a satirical response to "Shooting Niagara" entitled "A Day at Niagara" (1869).

== Other responses to Carlyle ==
- Carlyle is cast as Collins in "The Onyx Ring," a tale by John Sterling which first appeared in Blackwood's Magazine in 1843.
- Charles Kingsley introduced Carlylean characters in Yeast, A Novel (1848) and Alton Locke: Tailor and Poet, An Autobiography (1850).
- Elizabeth Barrett Browning mentions Carlyle by name in book five of Aurora Leigh (1856).
- George Meredith wrote a sonnet "To Carlyle" for his eightieth birthday in 1875.
- Carlyle figures in Meredith's Beauchamp's Career (1876) as Dr. Shrapnel.
- Algernon Charles Swinburne coupled Carlyle with John Henry Newman in "Two Leaders" (1878).
- James D. Merritt suggests that Carlyle be considered as the original of St. Barbe in Disraeli's Endymion (1880).
- Swinburne wrote the sonnets "On the Deaths of Thomas Carlyle and George Eliot" and "After Looking into Carlyle's Reminiscences" (1882).
- Montgomery Schuyler composed a sonnet, "Carlyle and Emerson" (1883).
- Sarah Orne Jewett wrote "Carlyle in America", an unpublished short story, in 1885.
- In Henry James' The Bostonians (1886), Basil Ransom is described as "an immense admirer of the late Thomas Carlyle."
- Arthur Conan Doyle references Carlyle in his 1887 novel A Study in Scarlet, using a character's unfamiliarity with the name to illustrate his utter ignorance.
- William Bell Scott, in his Autobiographical Sketches (1892), refers to a piece published in "an obscure magazine" titled "More Letters of Oliver Cromwell" wherein "the style of Carlyle [is] imitated."
- In Samuel Butler's The Way of All Flesh (1903), Ernest Pontifex is assured that he will "make a kind of Carlyle sort of a man one day."
- Carlyle is mentioned and quoted in The Column of Dust (1909) by Evelyn Underhill.
- Bliss Carman, in "The Last Day at Stormfield" (1912), a poetic tribute to Twain, described Carlyle as a "dour philosopher . . . Yet sound at the core."
- James Joyce parodied Carlyle in Episode 14 of Ulysses (1922), Oxen of the Sun.
- In To the Lighthouse (1927) by Virginia Woolf, Mr. Bankes bemoaned that "the young don't read Carlyle."
- Two Passengers for Chelsea (1928), a one-act play by American playwright Oscar W. Firkins, first appeared in Cornhill Magazine.
- Hugh Kingsmill published "Some Modern Light-Bringers, As They Might have been Extinguished by Thomas Carlyle" in The Bookman in 1932.
- In Vladimir Nabokov's Glory (1932), Martin Edelweiss considers the contrasting approaches of Carlyle and Horace in their non-utilitarian stances.
- In the Dorothy L. Sayers novel Gaudy Night (1935), Miss Lydgate criticises her former pupil Harriet's popular biography of Carlyle for having "reproduced all the old gossip without troubling to verify anything."
- The Fire-Lighters: A Dialogue on a Burning Topic (1938), a play by Laurence Housman, younger brother of Shropshire poet A. E. Housman.
- Elsie Prentys Thornton-Cook, a New Zealand-born writer, wrote Speaking Dust (1938), a novel that is "a reconstruction of the lives of Thomas Carlyle and his wife shown against the dramatic background of the time."
- Mrs. Carlyle: A Historical Play (1950), a three-act play by Glenn Hughes first performed at the University of Washington's Showboat Theatre on 7 October 1948 with Lillian Gish in the role of Jane.
- "The Inimitable Mr. Carlyle," one of the Grandfather Stories (1955) by Samuel Hopkins Adams, relates the impact of Carlyle on the culture of Rochester, New York in the 1880s.
- Carlyle and Jane by Henry Donald, first presented at the Edinburgh International Festival in 1974; the text mostly conforms to "what the two principal correspondents, their relations and friends, actually wrote."
- Neighboring Lives (1980), by Thomas M. Disch and Charles Naylor, is a fictional study of the Carlyles and their Chelsea neighbours from their arrival at No. 5, Cheyne Row in 1834 until the death of Jane in 1866.

== Sources ==
- Clubbe, John, ed. (1976). Carlyle and His Contemporaries: Essays in Honor of Charles Richard Sanders. Durham, North Carolina: Duke University Press. ISBN 978-0822303404.
- Cumming, Mark, ed. (2004). The Carlyle Encyclopedia. Madison and Teaneck, New Jersey: Fairleigh Dickinson University Press. ISBN 978-0838637920.
- Kerry, Paul E.; Pionke, Albert D.; Dent, Megan, eds. (2018). Thomas Carlyle and the Idea of Influence. Madison and Teaneck, NJ: Fairleigh Dickinson University Press. ISBN 978-1683930662.
- Sorensen, David; Kinser, Brent E. (11 January 2018). "Thomas Carlyle". Oxford Bibliographies. doi:10.1093/OBO/9780199799558-0037.
- Tennyson, G. B. (1973). "Thomas Carlyle". In DeLaura, David J. (ed.). Victorian Prose: A Guide to Research. New York: The Modern Language Association of America. pp. 33–104. ISBN 978-0873522502.
