= Amur River Tunnel =

Underwater railway tunnel in Russia

Coordinates: 48°31′33.32″N 135°1′52.30″E

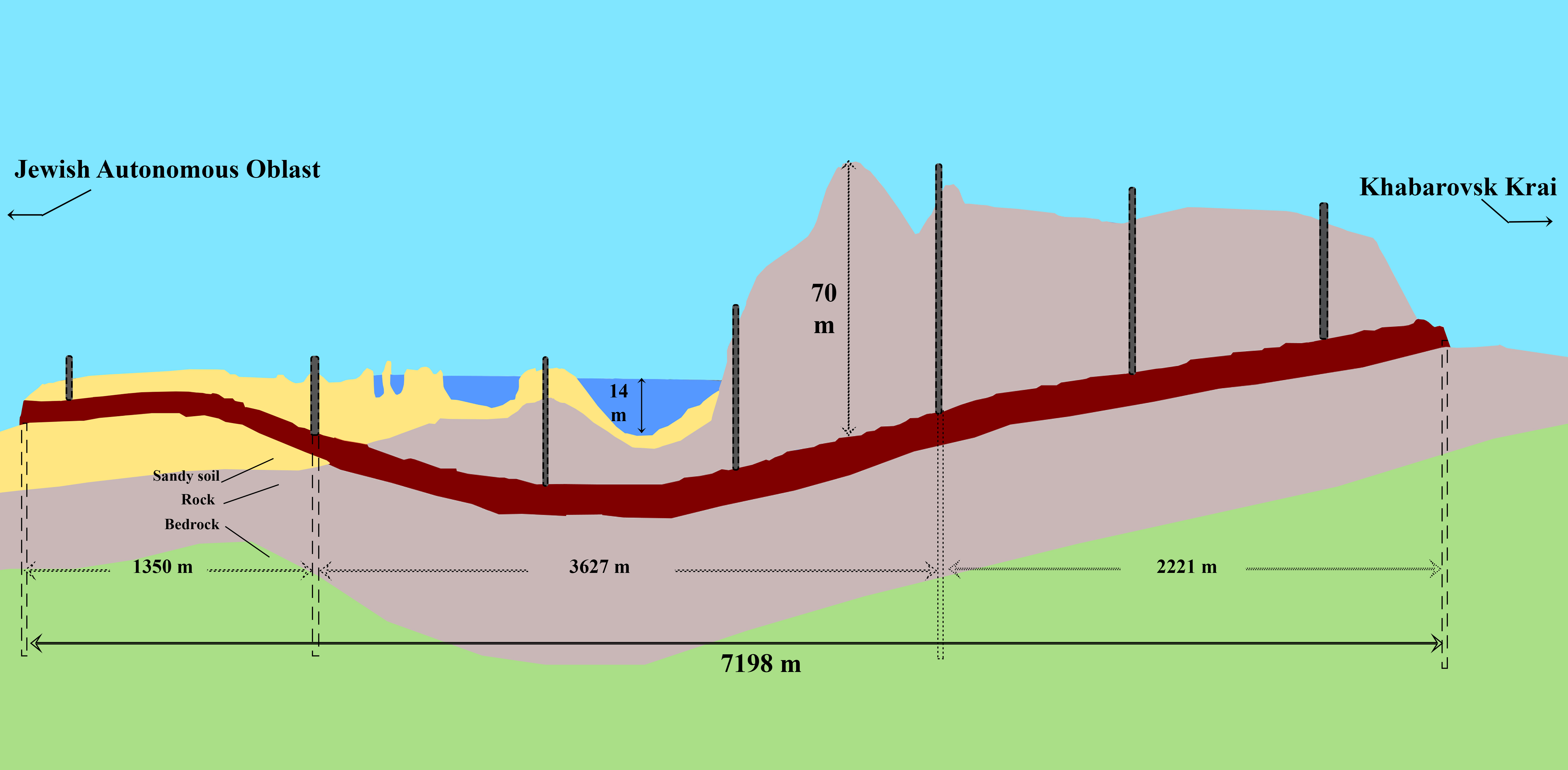
- Profile of Amur River Tunnel
- Interactive map of Amur River Tunnel

Overview
- Official name: English: Amur River Tunnel; Russian: Тоннель под Амуром; Russian: стройка No.4
- Line: Trans-Siberian Railway
- Location: Russia (Imeni Telmana, JAO, and Khabarovsk Krai)
- Status: Active since 25 October 1942
- System: OAO RZhD
- Crosses: Amur River

Operation
- Work began: 1937
- Opened: 12 July 1941
- Owner: OAO RZhD
- Operator: OAO RZhD
- Traffic: Railway
- Character: Passenger and freight

Technical
- Length: 7.198 km (4.473 mi)
- No. of tracks: single-track
- Track gauge: 1,520 mm (4 ft 11 27/32 in) (Russian gauge)
- Max elevation: −70 m (−230 ft)
- Min elevation: −14 m (−46 ft)
- Tunnel clearance: 7.40 m (24.3 ft)

External image
- Electric locomotive VL60K-1409 in the tunnel

The Amur River Tunnel (Russian: Тоннель под Амуром, during its construction — стройка No.4) is a 7.2 km long railway tunnel on the Trans-Siberian Railway, in Khabarovsk, Russia. It was built between 1937 and 1942 to provide an alternate route for the Khabarovsk Bridge across the Amur River. This tunnel is the only underwater tunnel on the Russian Railway network.

The concept of drilling a tunnel underneath the Amur River arose in connection with the construction of the Trans-Siberian Railroad. In 1913, at the exhibition of the plans Amur Region, there was a drawing of the tunnel, but the choice had already been made in favor of the bridge.

During the 1930s, the construction of a second track for the Trans-Siberian Railroad east of Irkutsk was undertaken. The need to build this tunnel was caused by the Japanese invasion of Manchuria in 1931, and the loss of the Chinese Eastern Railway. Accordingly, the bridge at Khabarovsk was vulnerable to the Japanese air raids. In 1936, because of the particular strategic importance for the country's Trans-Siberian Railroad, the Kremlin decided to build under the urging of the General Staff of the Red Army.

The technical design of the underwater 7.2 km long tunnel was carried out in 1937 by the Metroproject Institute which was then in the People's Commissariat of Communications of the USSR.

The seven-kilometre-long-railroad tunnel had been covered with five boards ??, 3627 meter-long mountain way?? (three faces) in the eastern sector, 1350 meters of open way in the western section, and an internal ?? diameter tunnel – 7400 mm for underwater. Using crushed stone, construction of houses and other surface structures carried out by railway troops. 900 experts in the primary professions and thousands of local civilian citizens worked directly in the tunnel under the Amur. About 5500 people worked only towards "construction № 4", a code name. Prisoners working in the Tunguska and in the New Stone ?? quarried limestone for buildings. The Magnitogorsk plant on the Ural River supplied the iron tubing to line the tunnel.

Shortly prior to the Great Patriotic War, the work was nearing completion. In 1941, after the outbreak of the war, Joseph Stalin set a time limit on completing the building of the railway. On 12 July 1941, the first train with builders on it ran through the tunnel. Regular traffic started on 25 October 1942.

During 1944–45, cargo transportation for the upcoming invasion of Manchuria against Japan began. In accordance with the order of the People's Commissar of Railways Ivan Vladimirovich Kovalev of 22 May 1945, on the Far Eastern Railway to expedite the work, procedures was put in place to skip all forms of transportation and military compounds. After the fighting in the Far East was over in August 1945, the secret tunnel facility was temporarily closed. Because of the growth in freight traffic, there was the need to increase the capacity of the Trans-Siberian Railroad in 1964. The tunnel was the used for the movement of freight trains. After the completion of the electrification of the railway through the tunnel, passenger trains began to pass through it.

Until 2008 the combination through Amur River was continued – on the railway bridge and the tunnel. In 2009, after completion of the second stage of the reconstruction of Amur bridge opening two-way traffic across it, the "bottleneck" problem has been removed. This made it possible to reconstruct the underwater tunnel, after which the construction of the Trans-Siberian Amur link was on three tracks – two on the bridge, and one in the tunnel.

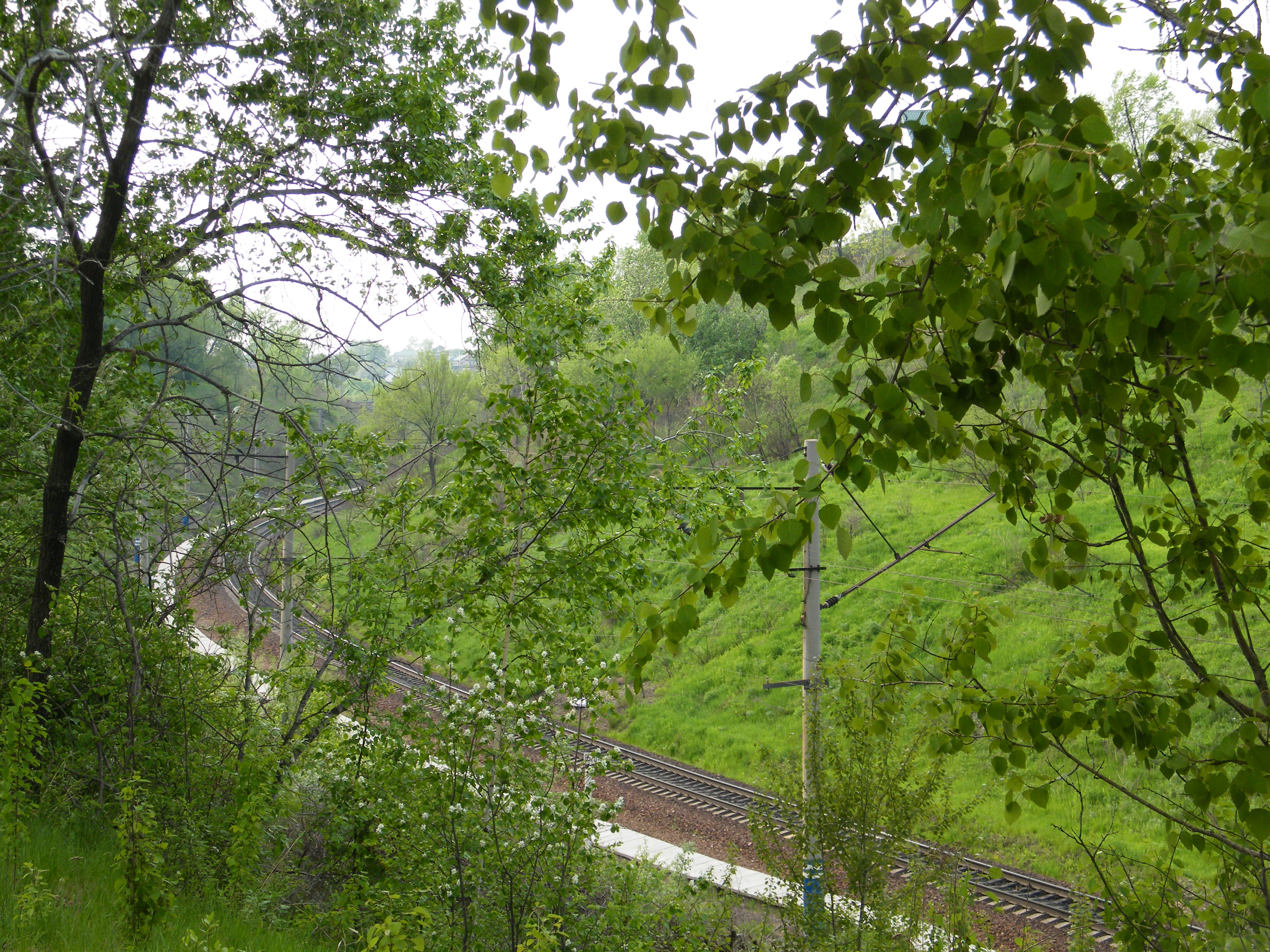
Railroad to the east tunnel portal (right bank), Kirovsky City District, Khabarovsk

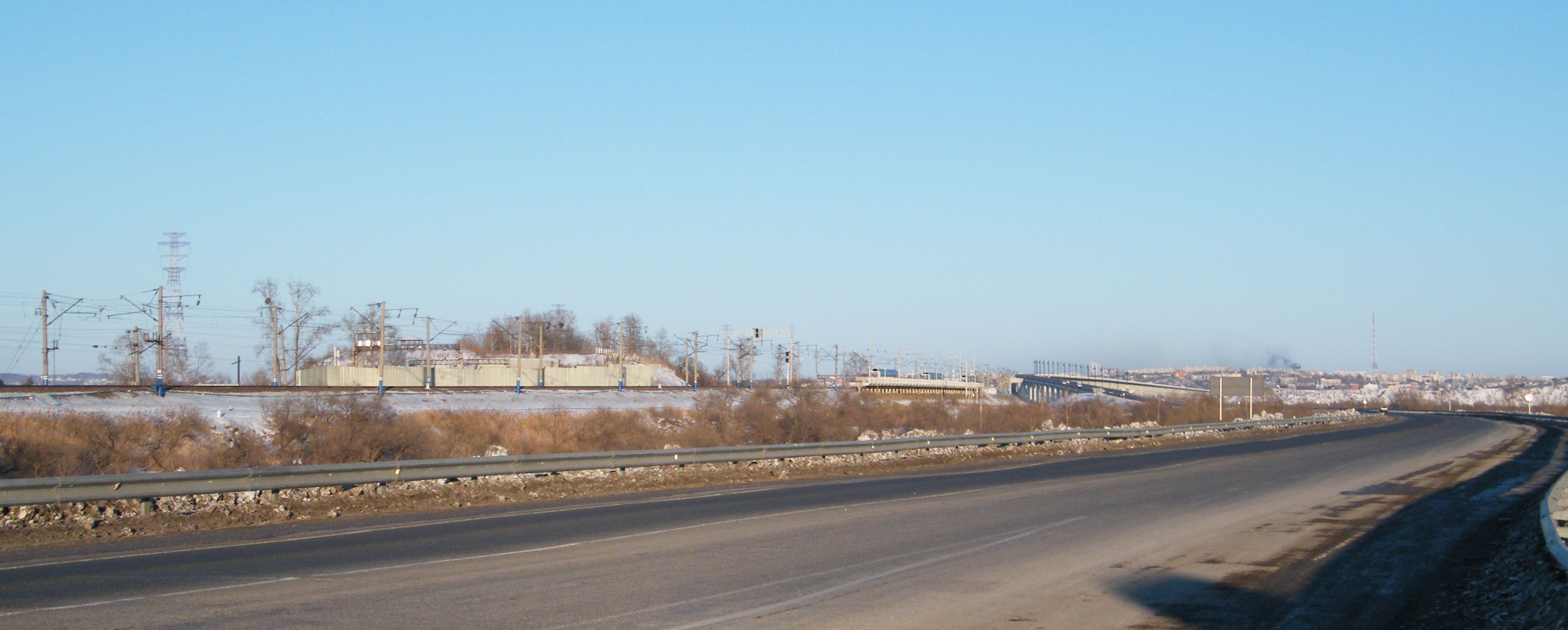
On the left side of the fence - the left bank (west) portal,
right - Khabarovsk Bridge left bank pier bridge.

Beside the eastern tunnel portal, there is a granite plate with words:

Glory to the Soldiers
from 7th Company under the Red Banner of Railway Labour Brigade who constructed a tunnel under the bed of the Amur River
1938—1941

== See also ==
Two related construction:

- Sakhalin Tunnel
- Bridges in Kyiv (Underwater tunnels)
