= Sam Patch =

American showman (1807–1829)

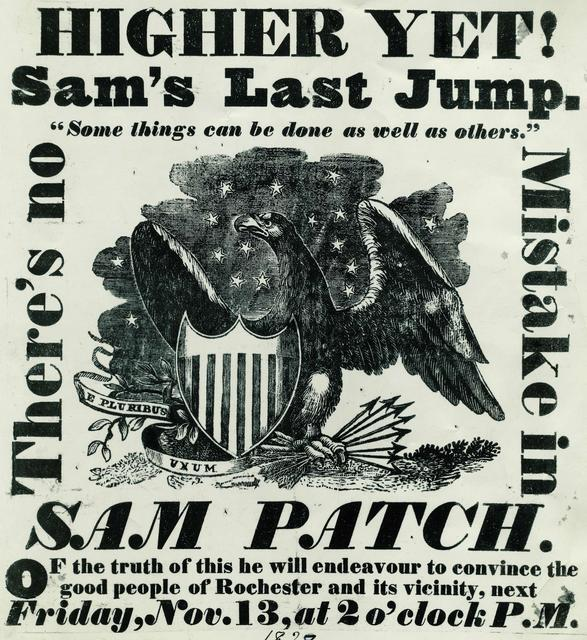
The advertisement for daredevil Sam Patch's fatal last jump

Sam Patch (1807 – November 13, 1829) was known as "The Jersey Jumper", "The Daring Yankee", or the "Yankee Leaper" became the first famous American daredevil after successfully jumping from a raised platform into the Niagara River near the base of Niagara Falls in 1829.

== Biography ==
=== Early life ===
Sam Patch was born to Mayo Greenleaf Patch and Abigail McIntire and was the fifth child of the family that included Molly, Greenleaf, Nabby, Samuel (died as an infant), Samuel, and Issac.

Sam was raised in Pawtucket, Rhode Island, where he began working as a child laborer spinning cotton in a mill. When he was not working, he entertained other boys by jumping off the mill dam. By his early 20s, he was working at a mill in Paterson, New Jersey, and was jumping off ever-higher spots. He was beginning to attract crowds for his well-advertised stunts. On September 30, 1827, he jumped off the 70-foot (21 m) Passaic Falls (The Great Falls of Paterson) in New Jersey, pleasing a large crowd that had gathered. He repeated this jump at least two more times. On August 11, 1828, Patch jumped 100 feet (30 m) at Hoboken, New Jersey. He became known in the press as "Patch the Jersey Jumper." Patch continued his career jumping from bridges, factory walls, and ships' masts.

=== Niagara Falls ===
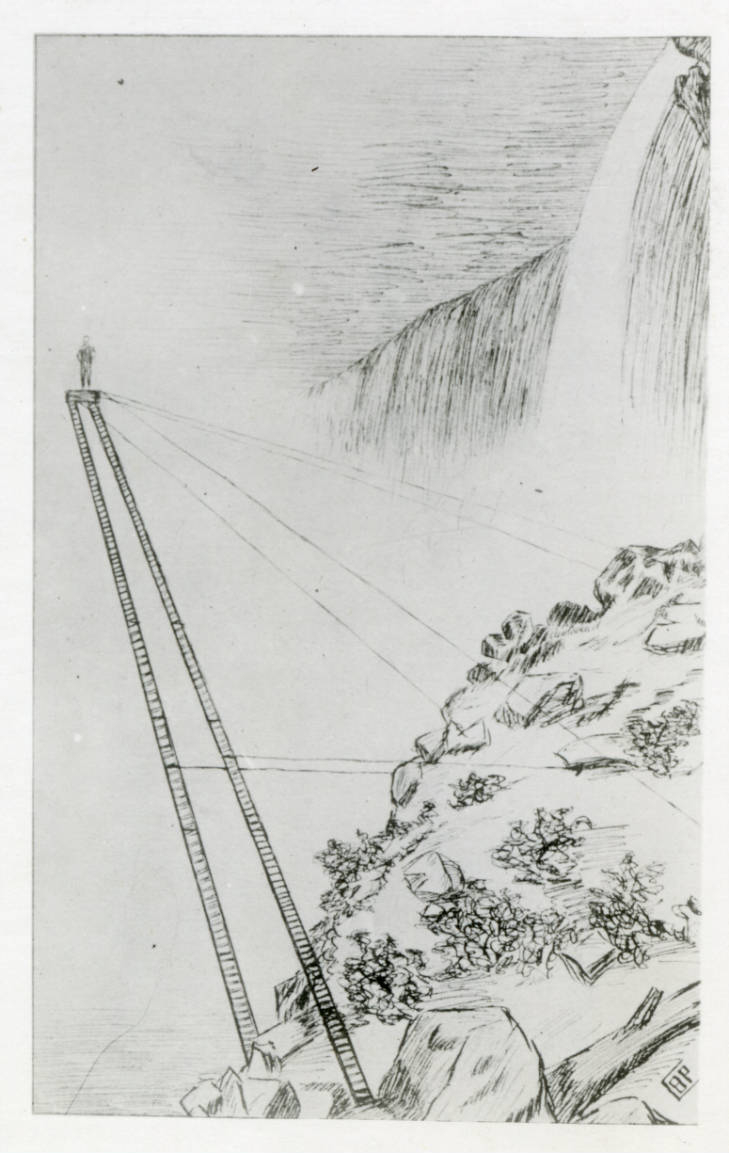
Sam Patch on his platform at the base of Goat Island

In the fall of 1829, Patch gained fame by leaping into the Niagara River near the base of Niagara Falls. Patch was the star attraction at an event designed to draw visitors to the falls. A 125-foot (38 m) ladder was extended over the river below Goat Island, opposite the Cave of the Winds. Less than an hour before the scheduled noon jump, a chain securing the ladder to the cliff wall snapped, breaking 15 feet (4.6 m) from the ladder. Rescheduled for 4 PM, Patch jumped on time, from a height of more than 80 feet (24 m). A boat circled near the entry point, but Patch did not appear. When he was finally spotted on the shore, a great roar went up from the crowd.

Bad weather and the delay in his arrival drew a disappointingly small crowd for this jump, so Patch announced he would repeat the feat a second time from the greater height of 120 feet (37 m) on October 17. A few days later, 10,000 gathered to watch him keep his word.

Following his feat at Niagara Falls, Sam Patch achieved nationwide fame. His name became a household word and his slogan "some things can be done as well as others" became a popular expression across the nation.

=== Rochester ===
Shortly after, Patch went to Rochester, New York, to challenge the 94-foot (29 m) High Falls of the Genesee River. On Friday, November 6, 1829, in front of an estimated 7,000 to 8,000 spectators, Patch went out onto a rock ledge in the middle of the falls. He first threw a pet bear cub over the falls and the cub managed to swim safely to shore. Patch then successfully jumped after the bear.

== Last jump ==
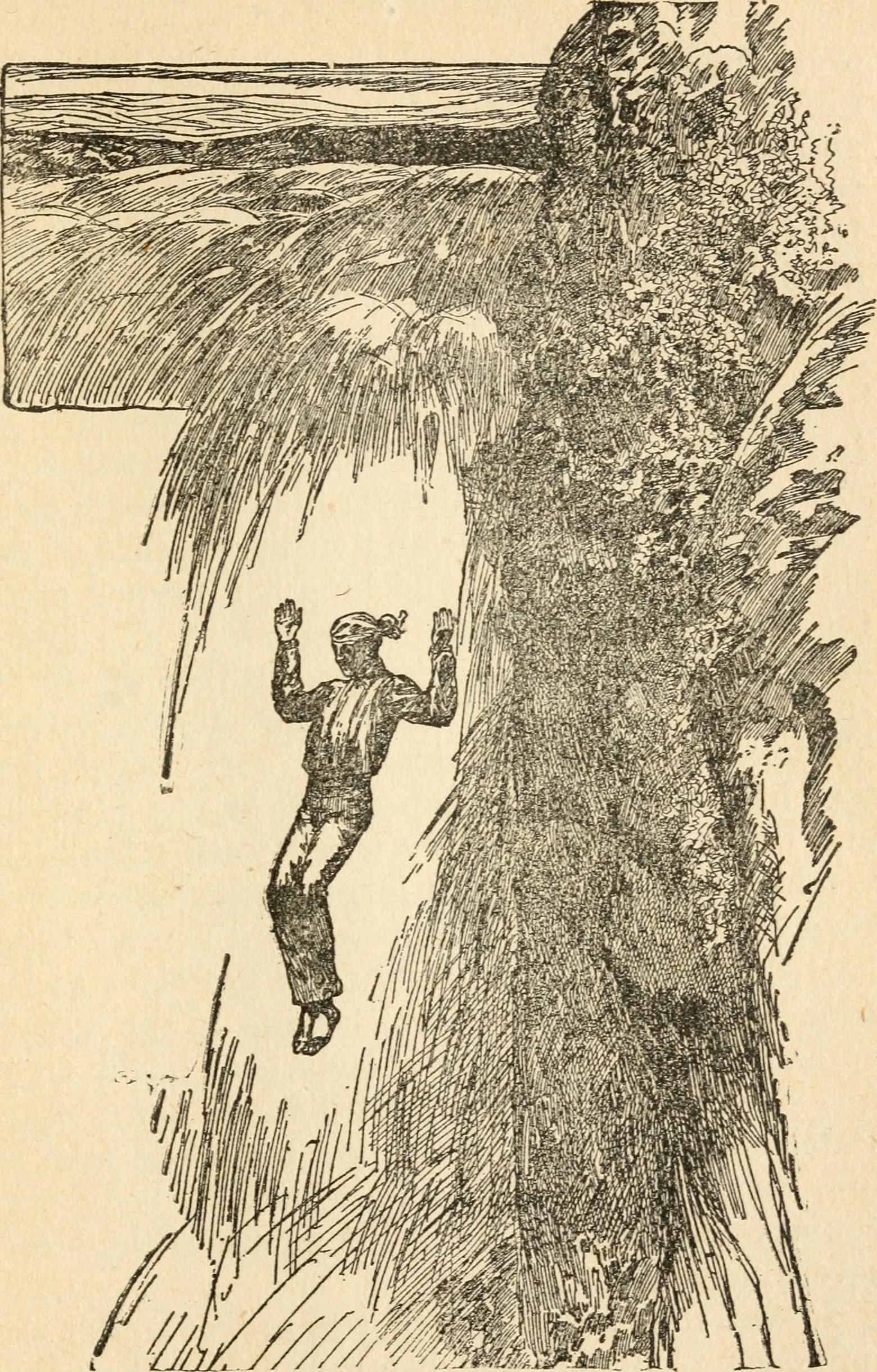
An illustration of Sam's last jump from "Old Ironsides, the hero of Tripoli and 1812, and other tales and adventures on sea and land" (1903)

His first jump into the Genesee River raised a disappointing amount of money, so he decided to repeat the stunt one week later on November 13, 1829, (Friday the 13th). This time, he increased the height of the jump to 125 feet (38 m) by constructing a 25-foot (7.6 m) stand. Accounts from the 8,000 present differ on whether he actually jumped or fell, but he did not achieve his normal feet-first vertical entry. A loud impact was heard and he never surfaced. Rumors were passed that he had hidden in a cave at the base of the falls, and was enjoying all the excitement he had created. But his frozen body was found in the ice in Charlotte (Rochester) early the next spring by Silas Hudson. An autopsy revealed that the sudden change in the temperature from the relatively warm air to the cold water had caused his blood vessels to rupture. Local ministers and newspapers were quick to blame the crowd for urging him to jump, and put the guilt of his death on them.

He was buried in Charlotte Cemetery, near where his body was found. A wooden board (now gone) was placed over his grave. It read: "Here lies Sam Patch – Such is Fame".

== Legacy ==
Sam Patch's legacy continued to build in the years following his death. He became a popular folk hero in both written poems and stories as well as the hero of a series of theatrical plays by actor Dan Marble entitled Sam Patch the Yankee Jumper, followed by Sam Patch at Home, a London Tour of Sam Patch in France, and Sam Patch the Jumper (1844). President Andrew Jackson named his horse Sam Patch in Patch's honor.

His legacy continues into the 21st century with media references including:

- The band Piñataland chronicled Patch's 1827 jump on a song titled "The Fall of Sam Patch" on their 2008 album Songs for the Forgotten Future Vol. 2.
- The IFC comedy sketch show The Birthday Boys referenced the story of Sam Patch as a running gag/call back during the 4th episode of their second season entitled "Freshys".
- The podcast The Memory Palace featured the story of Sam Patch in the episode "Plummeting Approval".
- Drunk History featured Sam Patch's story in the Season 4, Episode 2 episode, "Legends", played by actor and comedian Kyle Mooney.
- Canadian musician Tim Kingsbury adopted the name Sam Patch for a musical project.
- Sam Patch is the name given to a replica Erie Canal packet boat that provides tours of the Rochester area waterways.

=== Literary references ===
Cover illustration of "The Wonderful Leaps of Sam Patch" Published circa 1870

"Sam Patch's Fearsome Leap," a tale in Grandfather Stories by Samuel Hopkins Adams, is a reconstructed first-hand account of the day of Patch's last leap. It is not clear whether Adams based the tale on a real first-hand account or wrote it as historical fiction.

Patch appears as a "daring moral hero" in the works of Hawthorne and Melville, and also appears in the poem "Paterson" by William Carlos Williams.

The adventures of Patch and his bear, as narrated by the bear himself, comprise the picaresque novel by William Getz, Sam Patch: Ballad of a Jumping Man (New York: Franklin Watts, 1986).
