= Canal Town =

1944 novel by Samuel Hopkins Adams

- First edition (publ. Random House)
- Author: Samuel Hopkins Adams
- Language: English
- Genre: Historical fiction
- Publisher: Consolidated Book Publishers
- Publication date: 1944
- Pages: 471
- ISBN: 9-7808-1560-2286
- OCLC: 256995244

Canal Town is the title of a 1944 novel by Samuel Hopkins Adams.

== Synopsis ==
The novel is set in the 1820s in the town of Palmyra, New York, near Rochester, located on the Erie Canal. The novel opens in 1820, when the construction of the Erie Canal had just begun, but has not reached Palmyra, and most of the town is looking forward to the economic boom the Canal is expected to bring.

During the course of the book, Adams depicts the changes in the daily life brought about by the construction of the canal. By the close of the book, citizens in Palmyra are regularly and casually travelling to Rochester via packet boat on the canal, or to New York by canal packet to Albany and thence by steam packet down the Hudson.

On publication, a New York Times review by Catharine Brody noted that the book recalls the Erie Canal novels of Walter D. Edmonds, whom Adams acknowledges in his introduction. In fact, Edmonds allowed Adams to use his notebooks as background for the novel.

The book is constructed around a single plot device, a case that a Dr. David Little reported to the Albany County Medical Society in the early 19th century. Brody called the incident "a truthful old-wives' tale."

The chief protagonist is a young doctor, Horace Amlie. He is intelligent and dedicated, willing to treat both wealthy and indigent, and willing to accept barter in lieu of cash when necessary. He knows of the latest advances in medical science, such as vaccination against smallpox, and comes into conflict with an established doctor who prefers older treatments such as bleeding. Brody called him "an Arrowsmith in a high beaver hat."

Amlie visits a settlement called Poverty's Pinch, treats the sick, and pays respectful attention to an old woman named Quaila Crego who practices folk medicine.

Work on the canal is constantly interrupted by sickness and fever among the workers. He asks Crego whether the fever has broken out in the Pinch and takes notice when she says "It will, when the black moskeeter stands on her head."

Amlie's dedication brings him into melodramatic conflict with landowners who resent his efforts to enforce public sanitation, and with a wealthy and powerful landowner named Genter Latham.

Amlie becomes acquainted with a spunky adolescent girl named Araminta Jerrold and her best friend, Genter Latham's daughter Wealthia. Araminta admires Amlie and it comes as no surprise to the reader when she and Horace are married later.

A good portion of the plot turns on a romantic situation involving Genter Latham's daughter, Wealthia. It seems obvious to the reader that Wealthia is having an affair with a dashing canal boat operator, Silverhorn Ramsey. She is also engaged to one Kinsey Hayne.

Dr. Amlie perceives that Wealthia is pregnant, and assumes that the father is Hayne. Amlie is concerned about the possibility that Wealthia may seek "assistance" from folk healers in Poverty Pinch, or may travel to Rochester for an "illegal operation." Eventually he informs Wealthia's father, who is furious at the aspersions cast on his daughter. Nine months elapse and there is no birth. Amlie is bewildered because he was certain of his diagnosis, and equally certain that Wealthia has not had an abortion.

New York Times reviewer Brody says that the reader will "probably stay up the rest of the night" to discover "the resolving of a first-class medical mystery."

Meanwhile, Latham resolves to ruin Amlie financially and run him out of town. He succeeds in having Amlie's license to practice medicine revoked. Through a loophole in the law, the revocation is unenforceable on the water of the canal itself, and Amlie manages to eke out a precarious living travelling up and down the canal in a boat, seeing patients only on board his vessel.

Without Amlie's public-health efforts, sanitary conditions in Palmyra deteriorate, and there is an epidemic of typhus, to which Wealthia falls victim and dies. Unable to stand not knowing how he could have been mistaken in his diagnosis, Amlie and a collaborator exhume Wealthia, and discover that she has experienced a rare condition, called a lithopedion or "stone baby," in which a fetus dies in the womb but becomes calcified rather than being expelled.

Amlie confronts Latham with this evidence, Latham acknowledges Amlie's integrity, numerous complications are quickly resolved in the closing pages, and Amlie and his wife Araminta live happily ever after.
