= Benjamin Darrow =

American politician (1868–1911)

Benjamin Darrow (November 14, 1868 – October 1911) was an American lawyer, politician and writer. He served as a District Attorney in New York City around the turn of the century, was a prominent Deist and later nominee for Mayor of New York. Darrow was born in Liberty, New York. He attended Phillips Andover preparatory academy. He spent his undergraduate years at Harvard University, wherein he gained membership to the prestigious Hasty Pudding Club, after which he went to Yale Law School. Darrow famously prosecuted the Phelps-McMurphy case and was subsequently elected District Attorney for Kings County, the Borough of Brooklyn, New York. He died a month short of his forty-third birthday in October 1911, after being run over by a wagon while crossing Bedford Avenue. He was a close friend of famed journalist Samuel Hopkins Adams.
