= Khabarovsk Bridge =

Bridge across the Amur River in Russia

Coordinates: 48°32′10″N 135°00′00″E

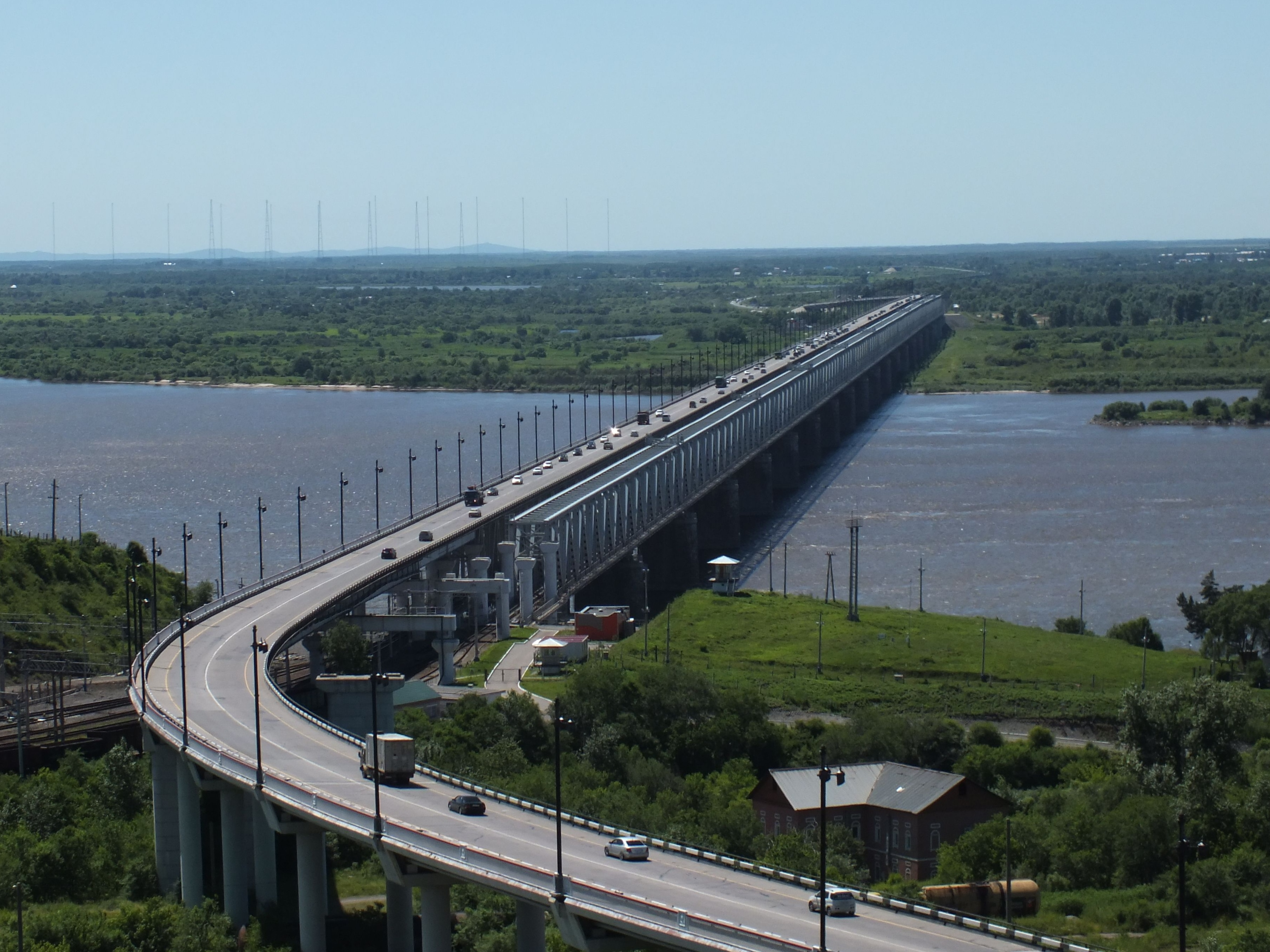
The bridge in 2013

Khabarovsk Bridge is a road and rail bridge that crosses the Amur River in eastern Russia, connecting the urban-type settlement of Imeni Telmana in the Jewish Autonomous Oblast with the city of Khabarovsk in Khabarovsk Krai.

The original single-track railway bridge was built in 1916. A reconstruction project in 1991–2009 expanded the bridge to two rail tracks and a roadway, completely replacing the bridge deck and trusses, and reusing and extending the piers from the original bridge.

== History ==
=== Construction ===
The Khabarovsk Bridge, originally constructed in 1916 as a single-track structure, serves as a vital crossing for the Trans-Siberian Railway over the Amur River near Khabarovsk, Russia. This historic bridge held the title of being the longest in both Imperial Russia and the Soviet Union for many years, boasting a length of 2,590 meters (8,500 ft).

The initial plan for the bridge construction involved a budget of 13,500,000 Russian rubles and a completion timeline of 26 months, following the design by the esteemed bridge builder Lavr Proskouriakov. Unfortunately, the outbreak of the First World War, one year after the construction began on 30 July 1913, posed challenges. The bridge was being constructed by the Warsaw-based K. Rudzki i S-ka company, and the spans were manufactured in its factory in Mińsk Mazowiecki. Consequently, the spans had to be transported to Khabarovsk by sea, taking a longer route around Eurasia.

During the autumn of 1914, a merchant ship transporting the final two sections was unfortunately sunk in the Indian Ocean by the German cruiser Emden, resulting in an unforeseen delay of over a year in the construction of the bridge. Eventually, on 5 October 1916, the bridge was successfully finished and officially inaugurated under the name Alekseyevsky, in honor of the esteemed Alexei Nikolaevich, Tsarevich of Russia.

=== Operation ===
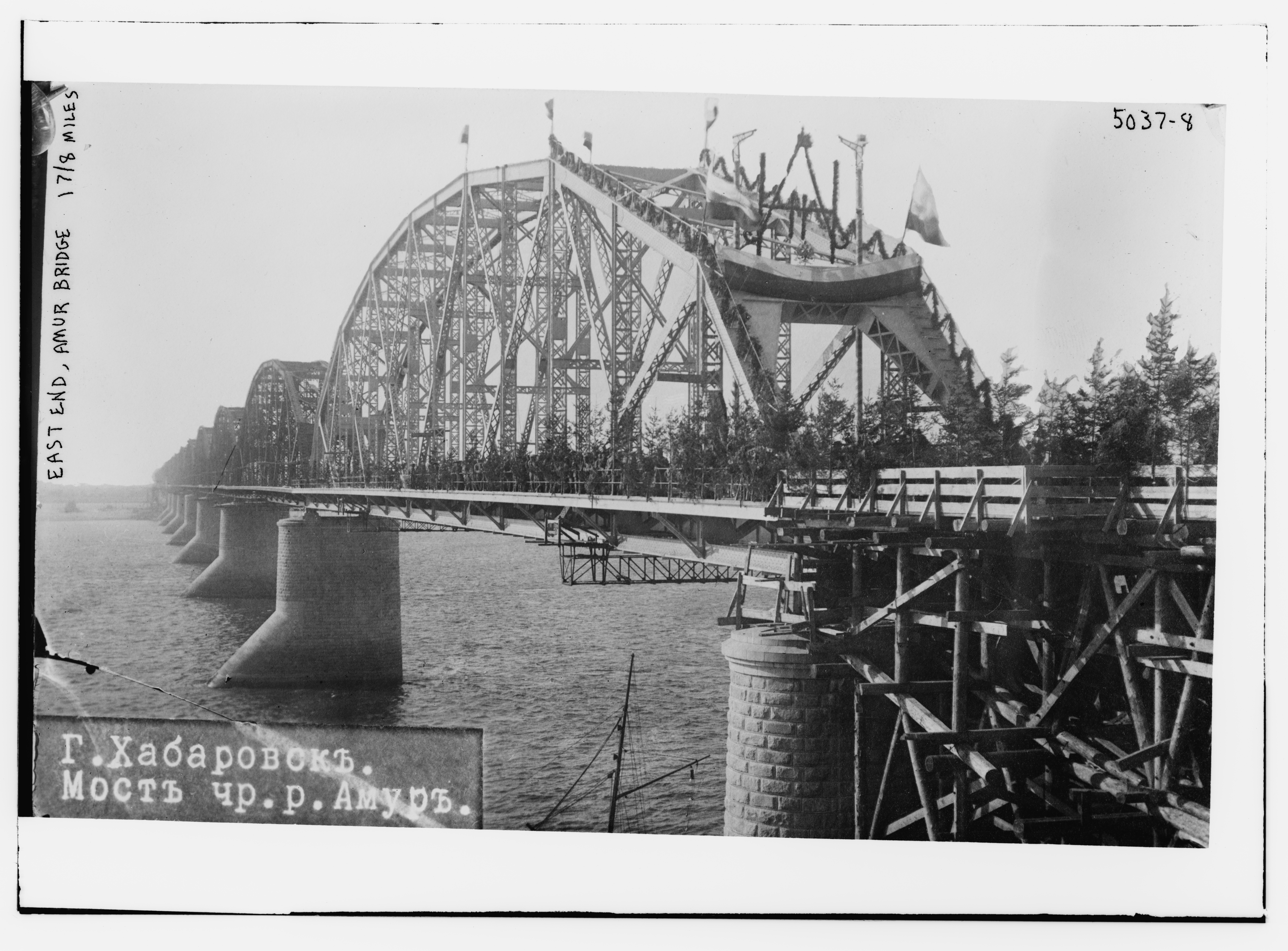
Bridge opening ceremony in 1916

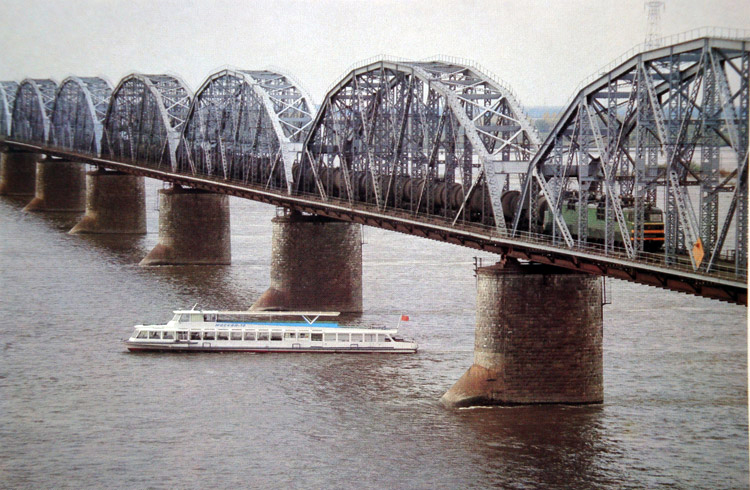
The bridge in the 1970s or 1980s

On 5 April 1920, two of the bridge's eighteen metal spans were detonated by guerrilla units retreating from Khabarovsk during the provocative speeches of the Japanese military in the midst of the Civil War. Consequently, the Trans-Siberian railway was disrupted for a period of 5 years.

The reconstruction of the bridge began shortly after Soviet rule was established in the Far East in November 1922. The 13th span was assembled in Vladivostok at the Dalzavod plant using parts from the spans that had fallen into the river. A reserve span was installed across the Vetluga River (a tributary of the Volga River) instead of the 12th span, as it had a slightly different shape but was suitable in dimensions and design. The plant Arsenal (now Daldiesel), located in Khabarovsk, made minor repairs and replaced missing parts. The bridge was reopened to through traffic by 22 March 1925.

For more than 70 years, the bridge provided uninterrupted rail traffic, the volume of traffic of which increased every year. Naturally, by the end of the 1980s, the structural elements of the bridge were no longer in satisfactory condition. Research was conducted with the goal of renovating the bridge. It was discovered that the spans and arches of the bridge were defective, leading to the implementation of speed limits, while the bridge supports are in satisfactory condition.

=== Reconstruction ===
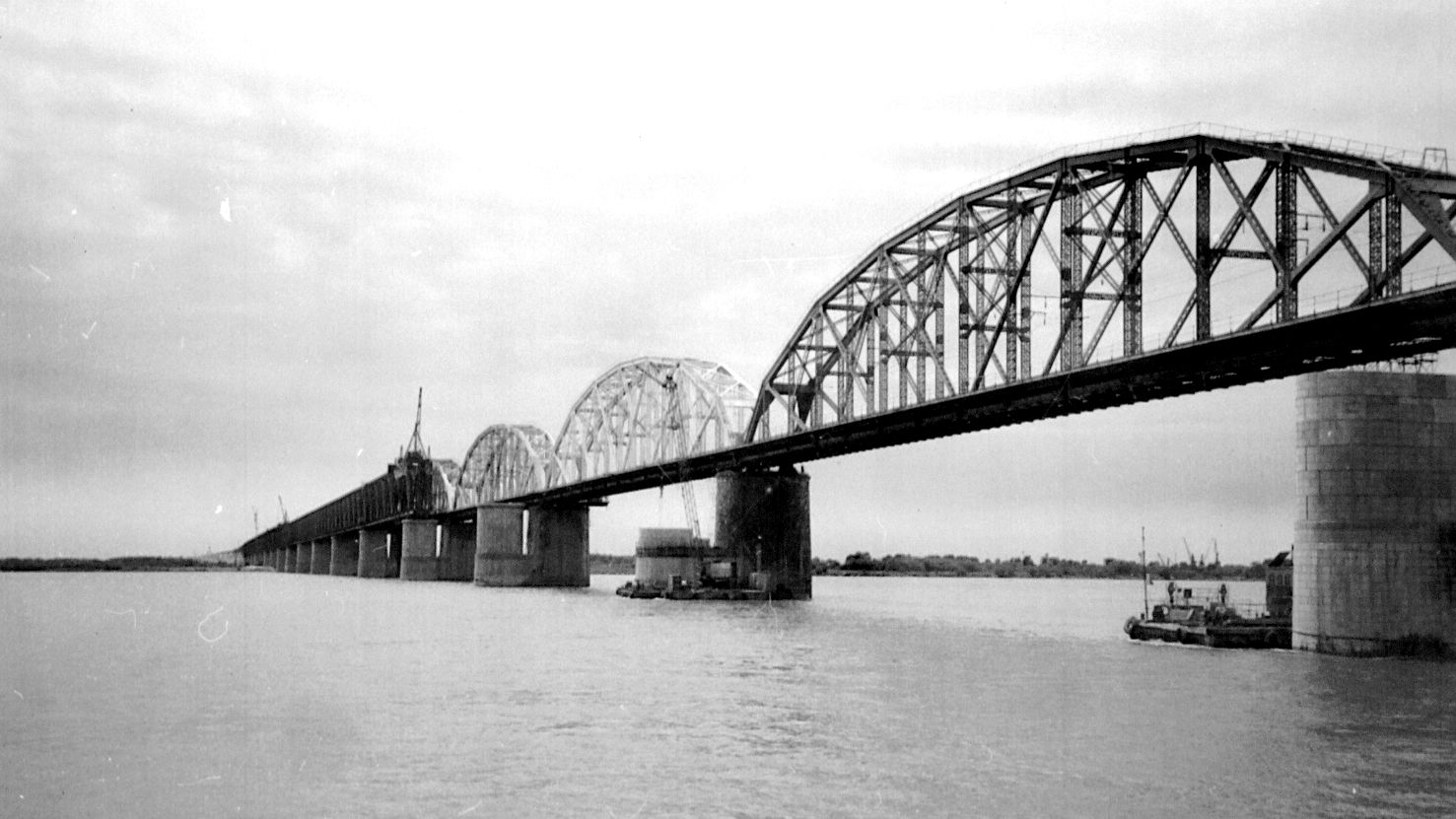
Construction of the new phase 1 bridge deck and piers alongside the old bridge in 1997

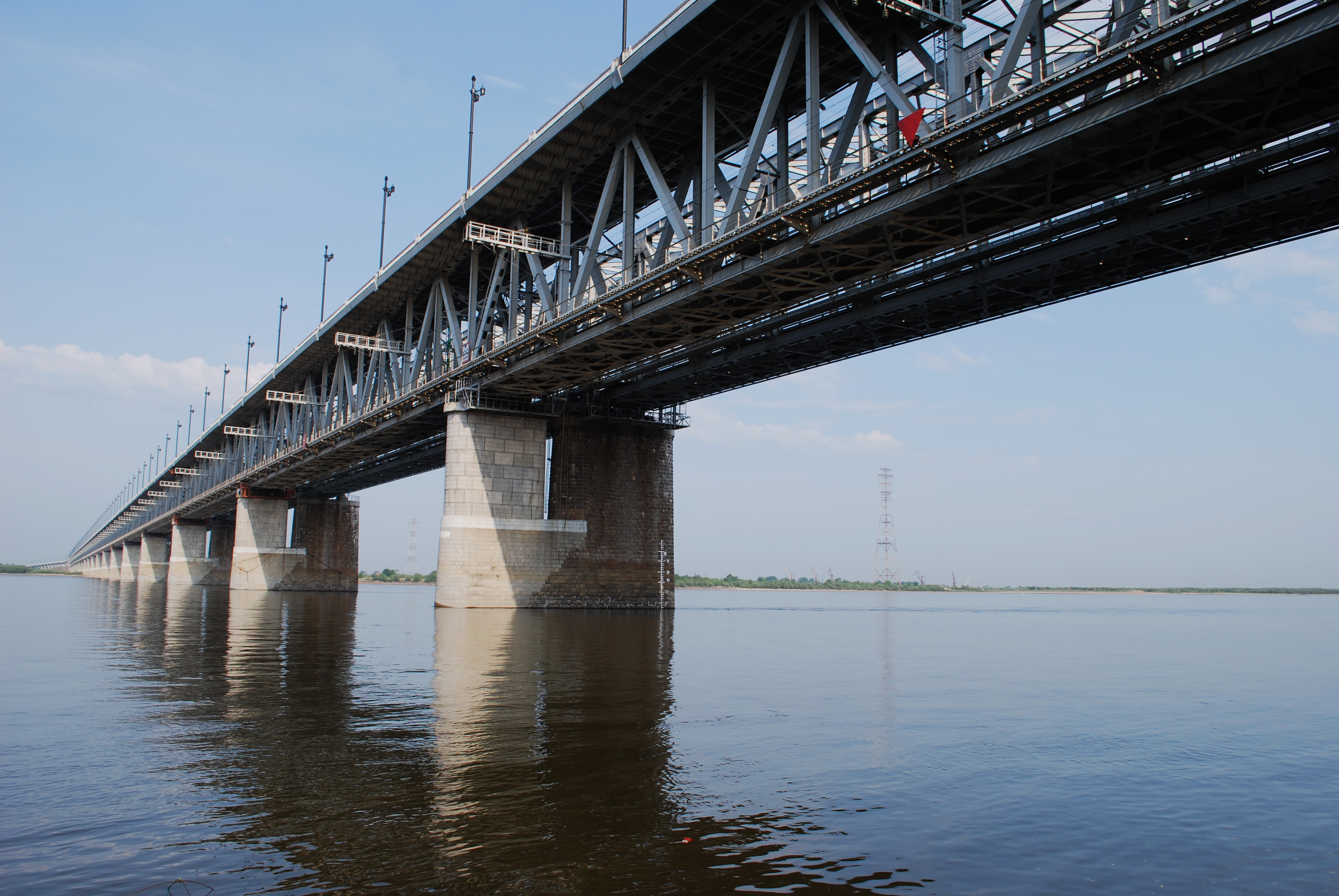
The new bridge in 2010, showing the old and new parts of the bridge piers

After many years of preparatory work, office visits, heated discussions and disputes with the public, who did not want to put up with the loss of the original appearance of the bridge, it was decided to restore it. The new project was developed by design teams from St. Petersburg, Moscow and Khabarovsk.

Work began in 1991. The first phase of construction extended the existing piers of the bridge and built a second track and roadway atop them, which was completed in 1999. Then, the trusses of the old bridge were dismantled and replaced with the second half of the new bridge deck, which was completed in 2009. As a result, the bridge became double-track for rail traffic on the lower level and two-lane for road traffic on the upper level.

With a length of 3,890 m, it holds significant importance. In the 21st century, the original spans of the old bridge were carefully dismantled, while its supports were thoughtfully preserved.

During the reconstruction of the bridge, the management of the Far Eastern Railroad Company came up with the idea of creating a museum of the history of the bridge. The first exhibit was an openwork truss from Proskuryakov's design, which was saved during dismantling (18 other Tsarist-era metal supports were sold to China as scrap metal). Over three weeks, experts used hydraulic jacks to rotate the 127-metre span, which weighs more than 1,000 tonnes, symbolically placing the retro truss parallel to the new bridge. Subsequently, a real miniature park and historical zone with steam locomotives, tanks and platforms was formed in the adjacent territory.

The reconstructed Khabarovsk Bridge is even honored by being featured on the 5,000 Russian ruble banknote.

=== Gallery ===
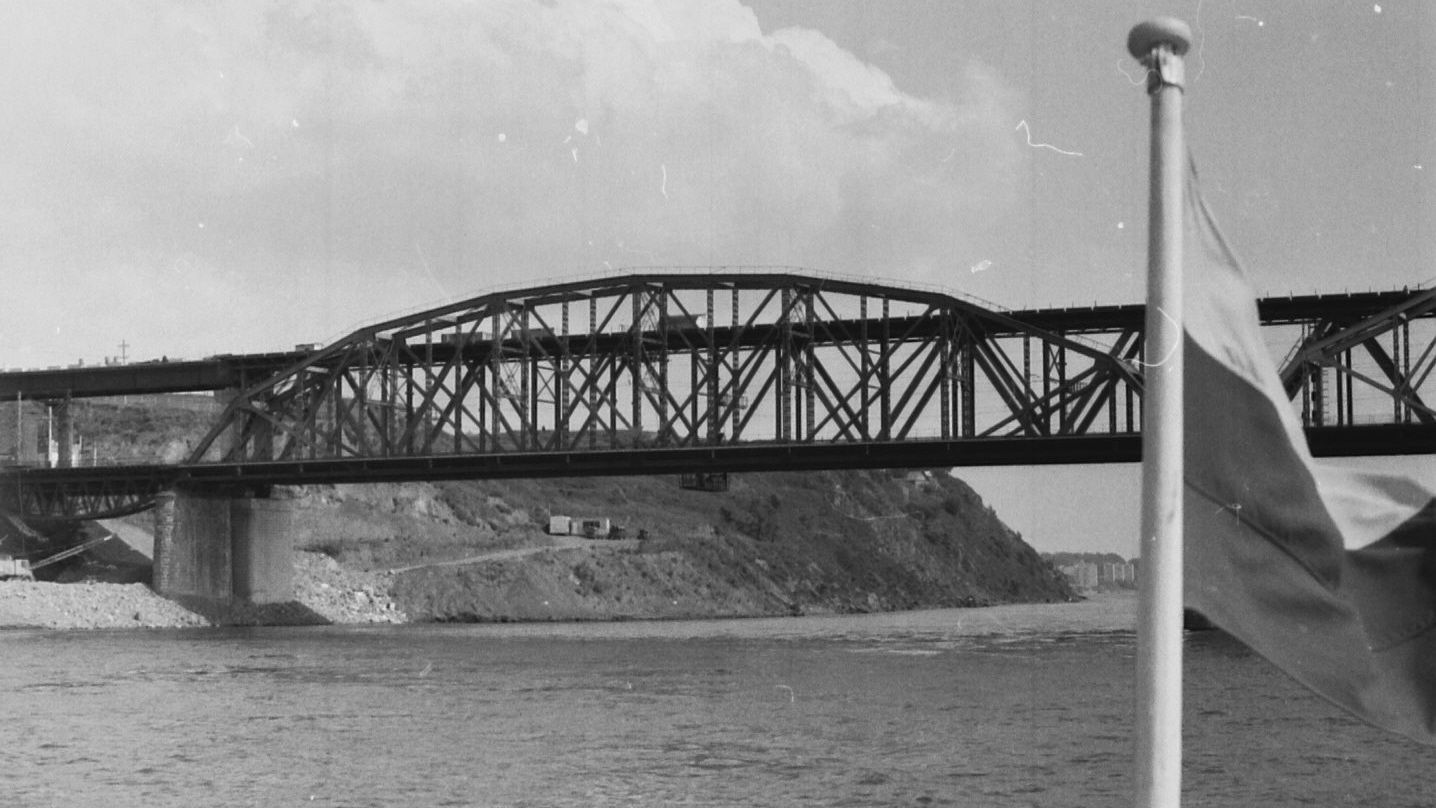
The old bridge in 1998.

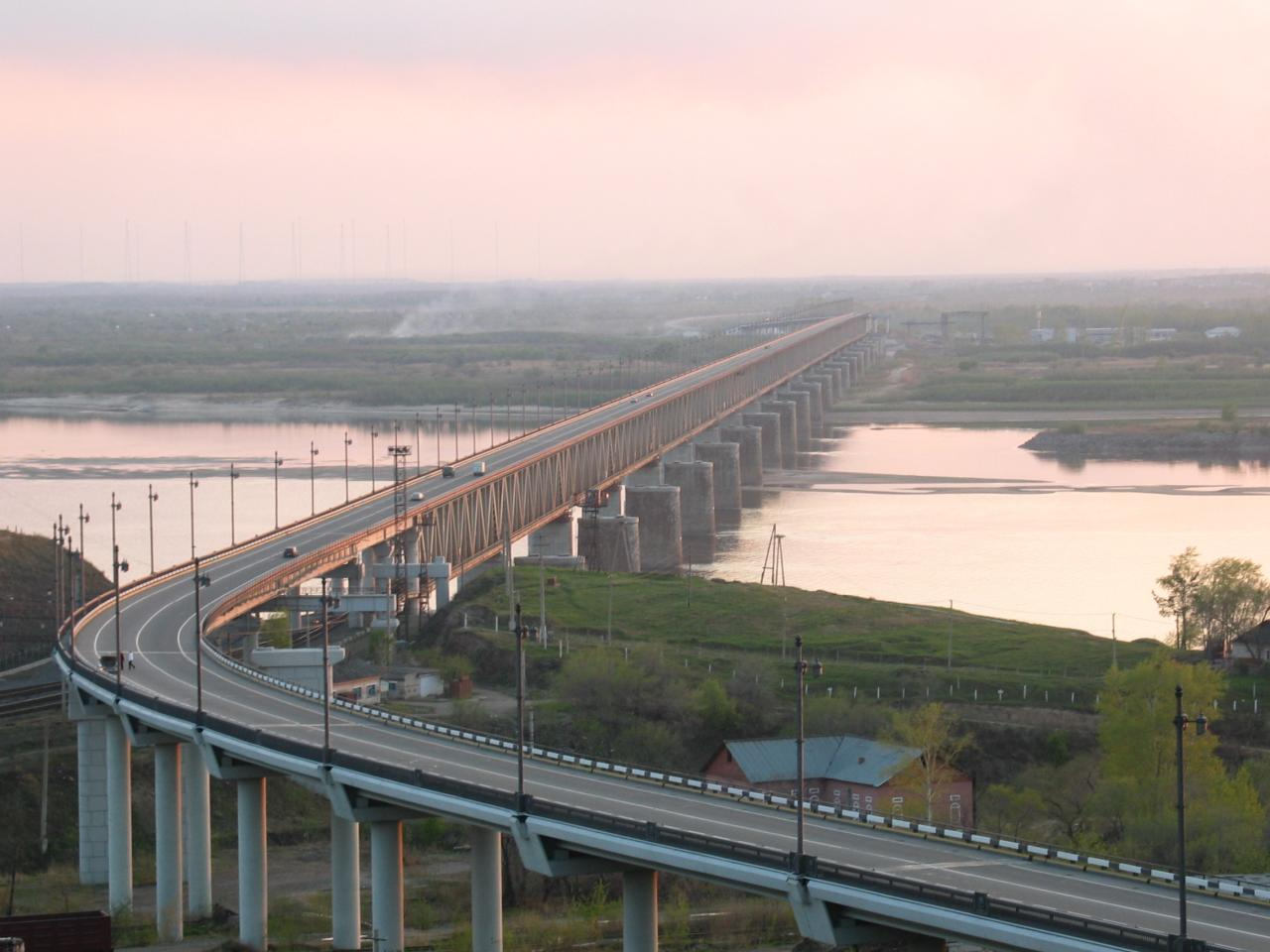
The bridge in 2005, before construction of the second phase.

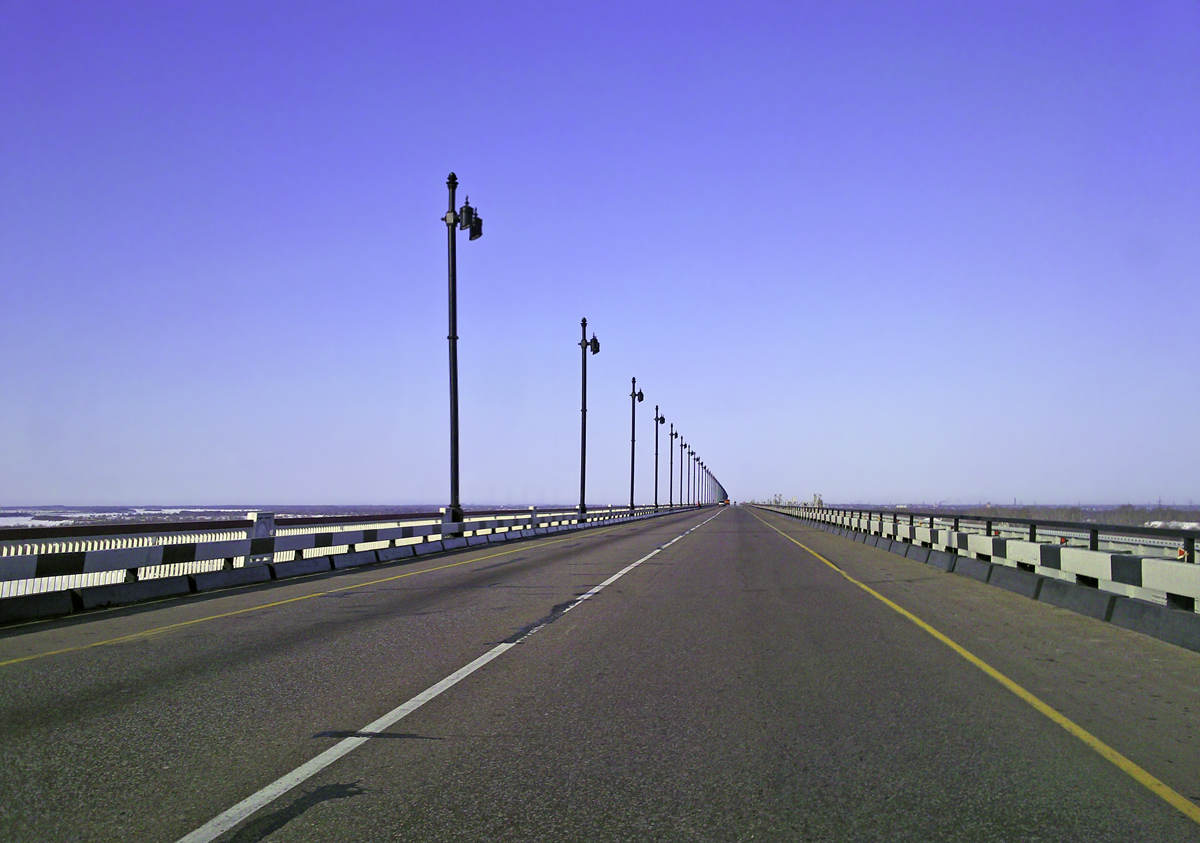
Driving across the bridge in 2010

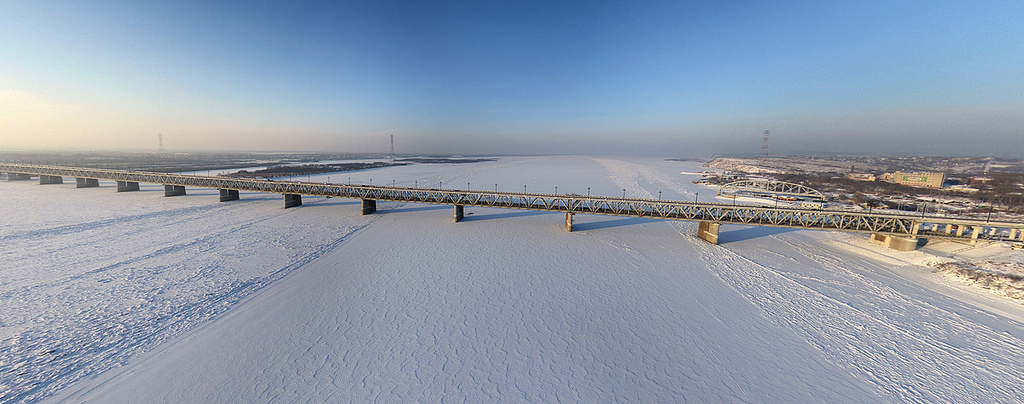
A section of the bridge in Khabarovsk in the winter of 2012.

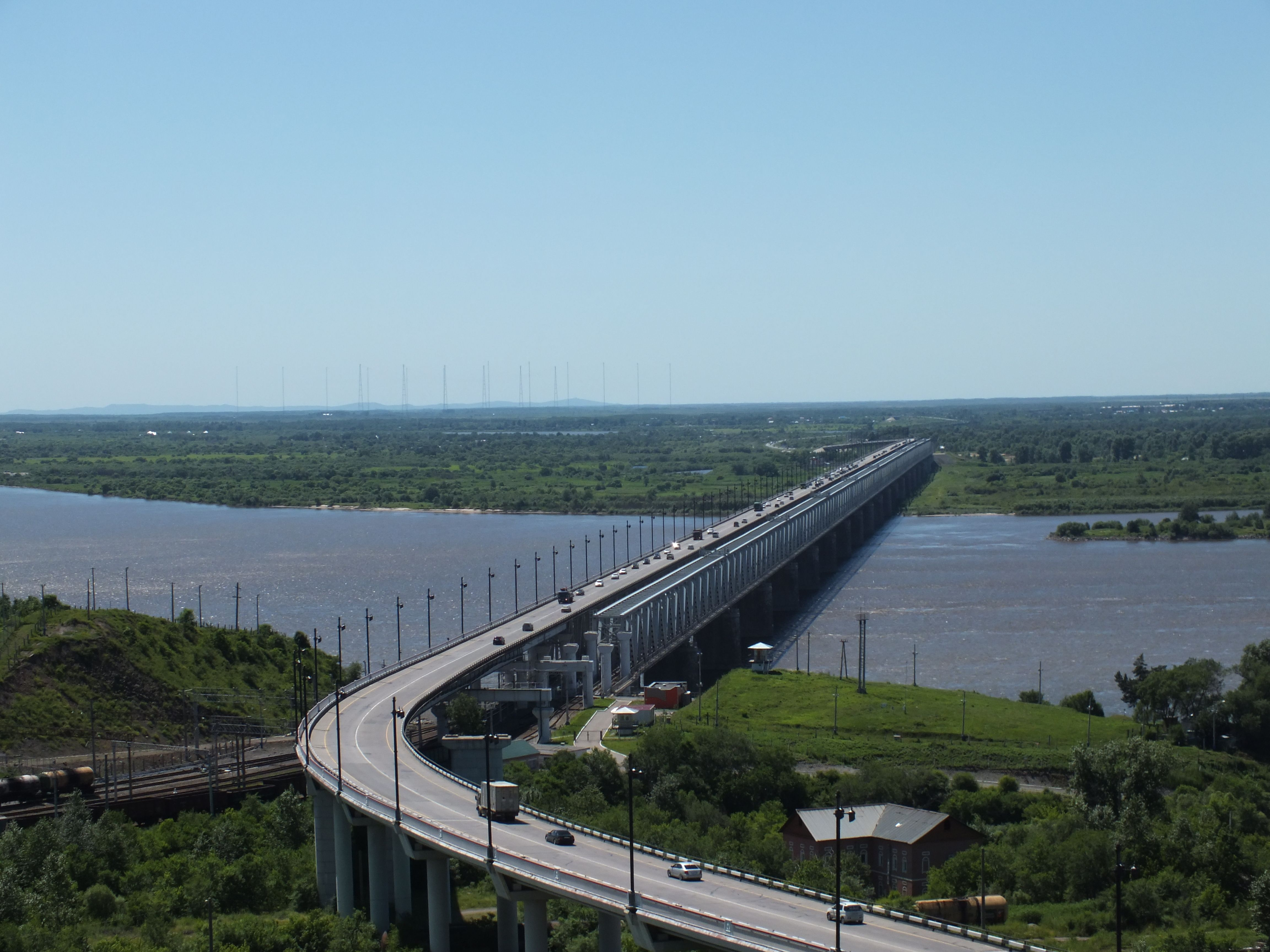
The bridge in the summer of 2013.

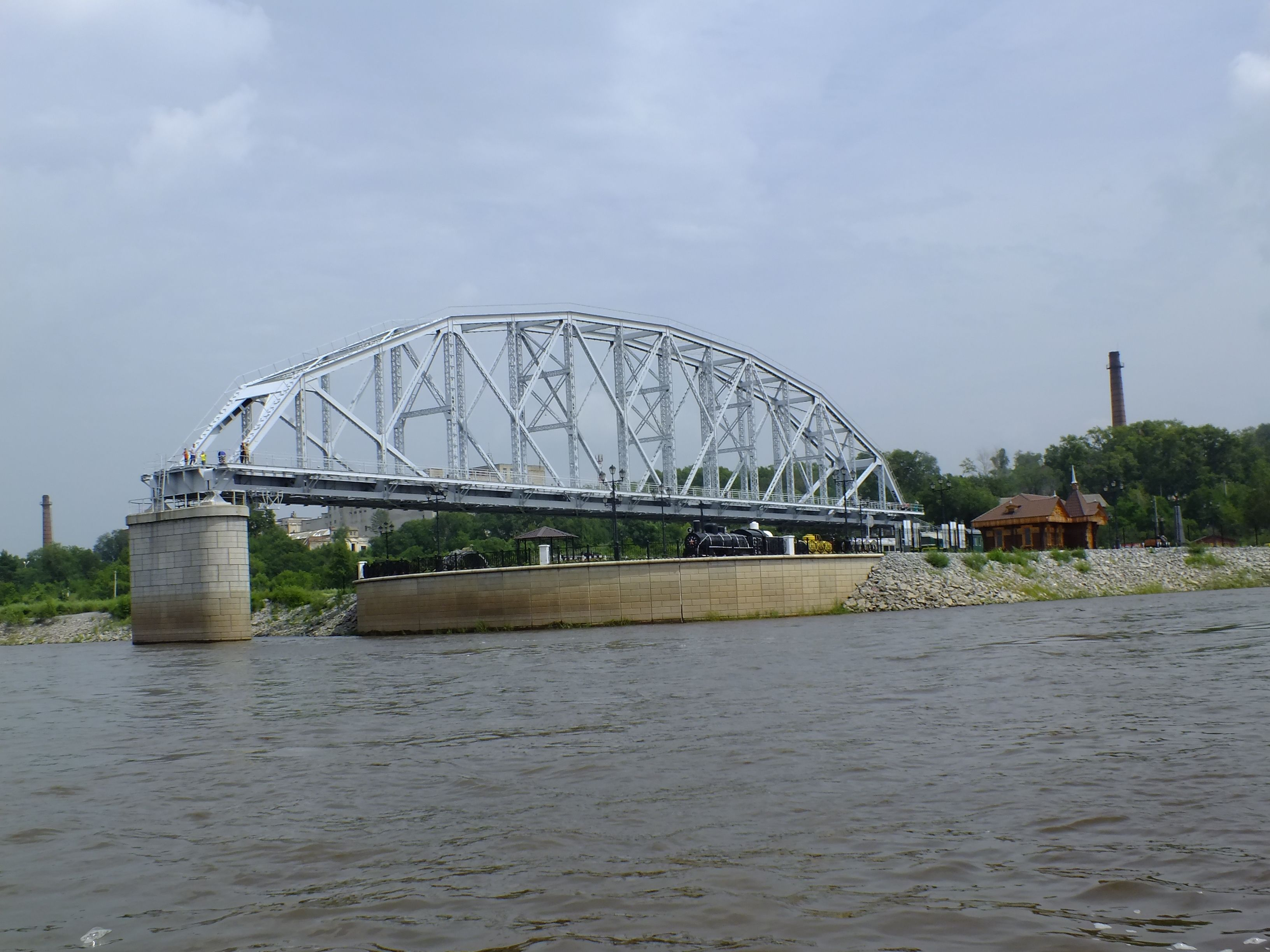
A preserved span of the old bridge in 2014.

The old portion as the Khabarovsk Bridge museum in 2024.

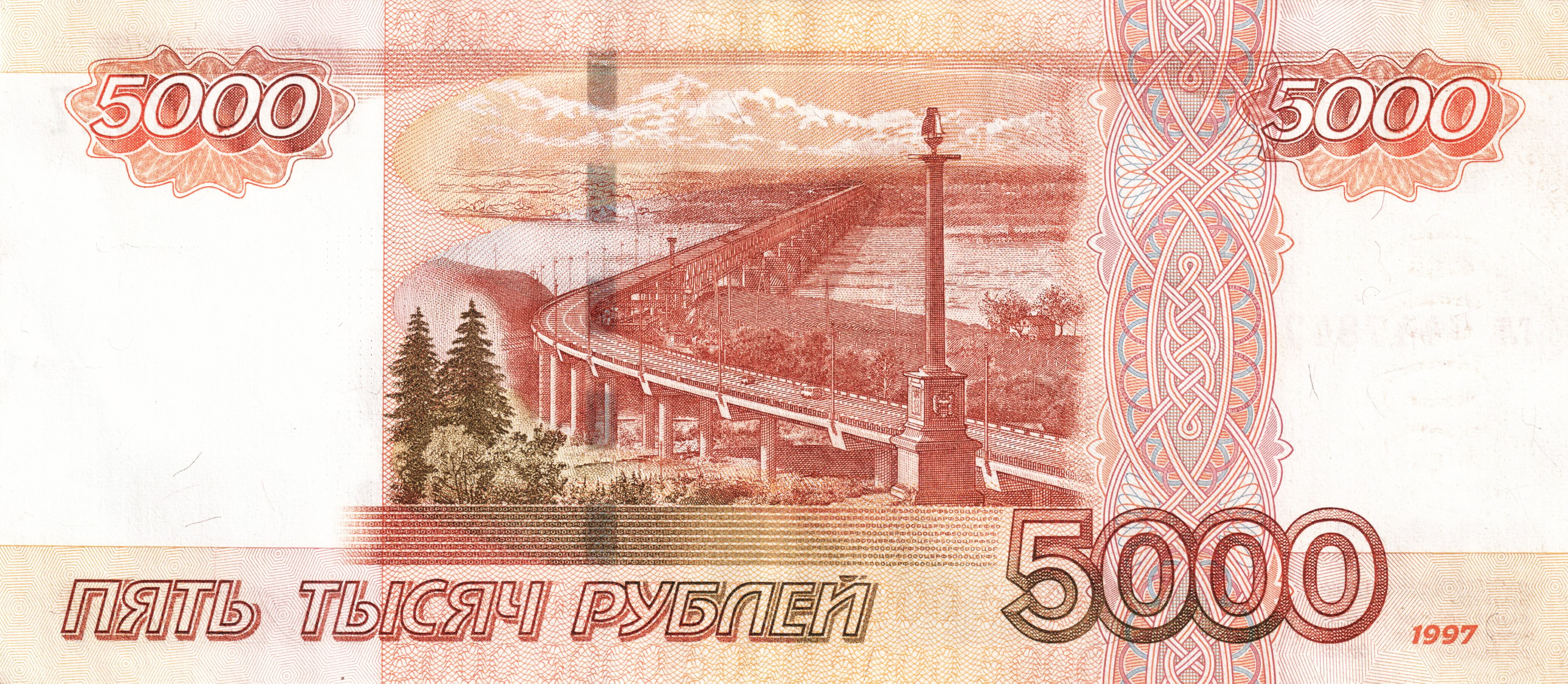
The bridge on the 5,000 Russian ruble banknote.

== See also ==
- Amur River Tunnel
- The bridge across the Amur River (Komsomolsk-on-Amur)
- Trans-Siberian Railway
