= Week Ends Only =

1932 film

- Directed by: Alan Crosland
- Written by: William M. Conselman; Samuel Hopkins Adams (novel & screenplay as Warner Fabian)
- Starring: Joan Bennett; Ben Lyon
- Cinematography: Hal Mohr
- Edited by: Louis R. Loeffler
- Distributed by: Fox Film Corporation
- Release date: June 19, 1932
- Running time: 70 minutes
- Country: United States
- Language: English

Week Ends Only is a 1932 American pre-Code drama film directed by Alan Crosland and starring Joan Bennett, Ben Lyon and John Halliday. It was made by Fox Film Corporation. The screenplay was written by William M. Conselman and Samuel Hopkins Adams, based on novel by Samuel Hopkins Adams.

== Cast ==
- Joan Bennett as Venetia Carr
- Ben Lyon as Jack Williams
- John Halliday as Arthur Ladden
- Halliwell Hobbes as Martin
- Walter Byron as Jimmy Brigg
- Henry Armetta as Washroom Attendant
- John Arledge as Ted Lane
