= Komsomolsk-on-Amur road-rail bridge =

Railway Bridge Of Russia

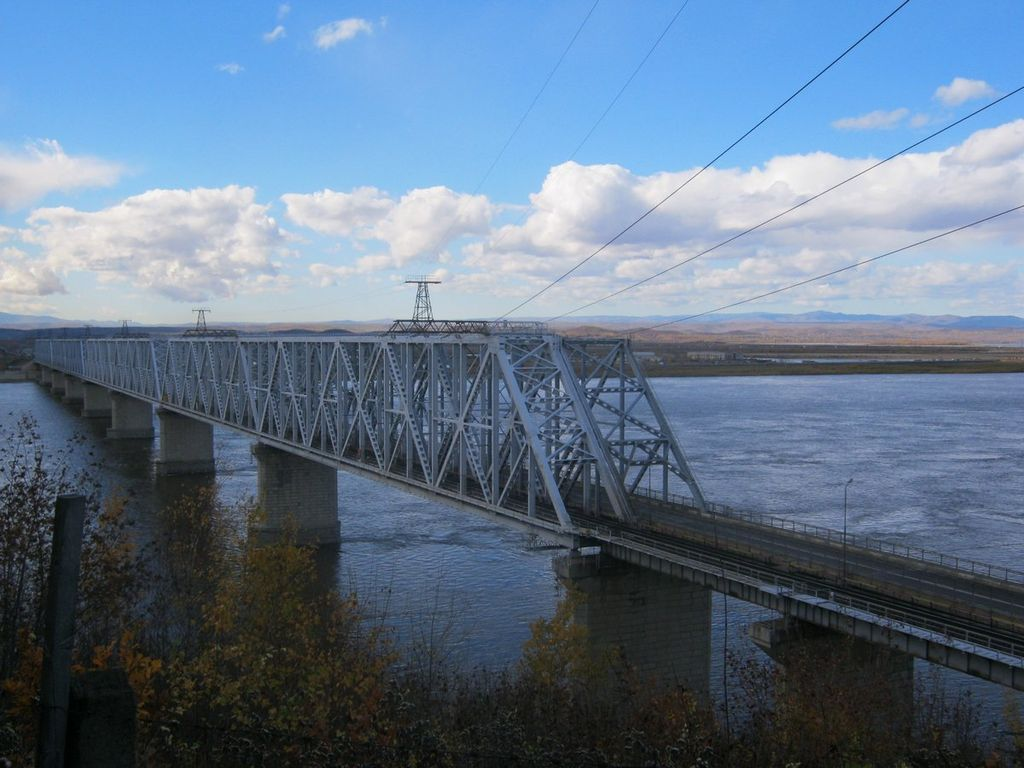
- Coordinates: 50°28′29″N 137°01′56″E
- Crosses: Amur
- Locale: Komsomolsk-on-Amur

Characteristics
- Design: a single-rail track and two-lane highway
- Material: Reinforced concrete, rock asphalt, granite, steel
- Total length: 1,435.32 m (4,709.1 ft)
- Height: 24 m (79 ft)
- Longest span: 319.97 m (1,049.8 ft)
- No. of spans: 4

History
- Designer: 'Lengiprotransmost' (LGTM)
- Construction start: 1969
- Inaugurated: 26 September 1975

Statistics
- Daily traffic: road-rail

Location
- Interactive map of Komsomolsk-on-Amur road-rail bridge

The bridge across the Amur River (in Komsomolsk-on-Amur) is a road-rail bridge across the Amur River near the city of Komsomolsk-on-Amur. The bridge has a single-rail track and two-lane highway that allows to completely divide cars and other vehicles from trains. The bridge carries also a single-circuit 220 kV-powerline.

Train service on the bridge began in 1975, while automobile traffic — in 1981. The bridge is part of the railroad line Komsomolsk-on-Amur — Sovetskaya Gavan, and of the highway of regional significance R454 Khabarovsk — Komsomolsk-on-Amur.

== History ==
During the period spanning from June to September in 1932, an important survey was conducted to assess the feasibility of constructing a bridge over the Amur River in the vicinity of the city Komsomolsk-on-Amur. This survey was particularly significant as it took place during the construction of the Baikal-Amur Mainline. The team responsible for conducting the survey consisted of expert professionals from the esteemed Lengiprotransmost Institute. Their primary objective was to evaluate and propose three potential options for the location of the bridge, specifically addressing whether it should be situated upstream, downstream, or within the city limits, extending all the way to the village of Pivan-1.

Prior to the construction of the bridge, the transportation across the Amur River relied on consistent ferry services. However, with the introduction of the Khabarovsk — Komsomolsk-on-Amur — Sovetskaya Gavan railway, a new method of transporting rolling stock emerged. This involved the utilization of railferries, specifically the railway ferries named Project 723, Volga (which was initially referred to as The ferry number 1 until 1952), Don (previously known as The ferry number 2 until 1952), Amur, and Komsomolsk.

In the winter months, a clever solution was implemented to ensure safe transportation over the icy terrain. Long sleepers were used to lay temporary rails on the frozen surface, effectively spreading the weight of passing wagons. This ingenious method became a common practice, starting from 1961, to extend the route of ferries during the autumn and winter seasons.

The construction of the bridge commenced in the year 1969 and continued for several years. It was not until October 1974 that the final pier, one among the total of nine piers, was finally erected, signifying a significant milestone in the project. The process of installing the last span, which was a crucial component of the bridge, was eventually concluded on 1 August 1975, bringing the entire construction process to a successful completion.

The grand inauguration of the primary bridge of the Baikal-Amur Mainline took place on 26 September 1975, marking a significant moment in rail transportation history. As the clock struck midday, a bustling passenger train departed from the bustling station of Komsomolsk-on-Amur, proudly traversing the magnificent structure's first portal. Meanwhile, bidding farewell to their loyal service of over three decades, the ferries that once gracefully sailed across the Amur River bid their final adieu, emitting a series of resonant beeps that echoed through the air.

== Design ==
In 1970, the LengiProTransmost (LGTM) design agency was commissioned by the USSR Ministry of Transport and Construction to create a preliminary design for a future bridge. This sketch of the bridge took into consideration various factors, such as the type of loads it would need to support and the specific requirements for steel railway bridges. Specifically, the superstructure of the bridge was designed to withstand S-14 Сlass loads, while the two-lane highway portion of the bridge was meant to accommodate NC-80 and N-30 Сlass loads. Additionally, the bridge design was tailored for use in the Arctic Zone A, taking into account the unique environmental conditions of that area.

The Komsomolsk crew MO-26 from the company Mostostroy-8 was responsible for the construction work. Interestingly, the single-rail track and two-lane highway have been designed to share the same ferro-concrete piers. This means that two spans of the single-rail track and two spans of the two-lane highway are supported by these piers. To achieve this, the spans of the two-lane highway are cleverly installed on remote brackets, which are positioned downstream in relation to the railway trusses.

The total length of the bridge, including approaches from abutment to abutment, is 1,435 metres. The height of the bridge from the water surface is 24 metres. A catchment area is 1,730,000 km^{2}.

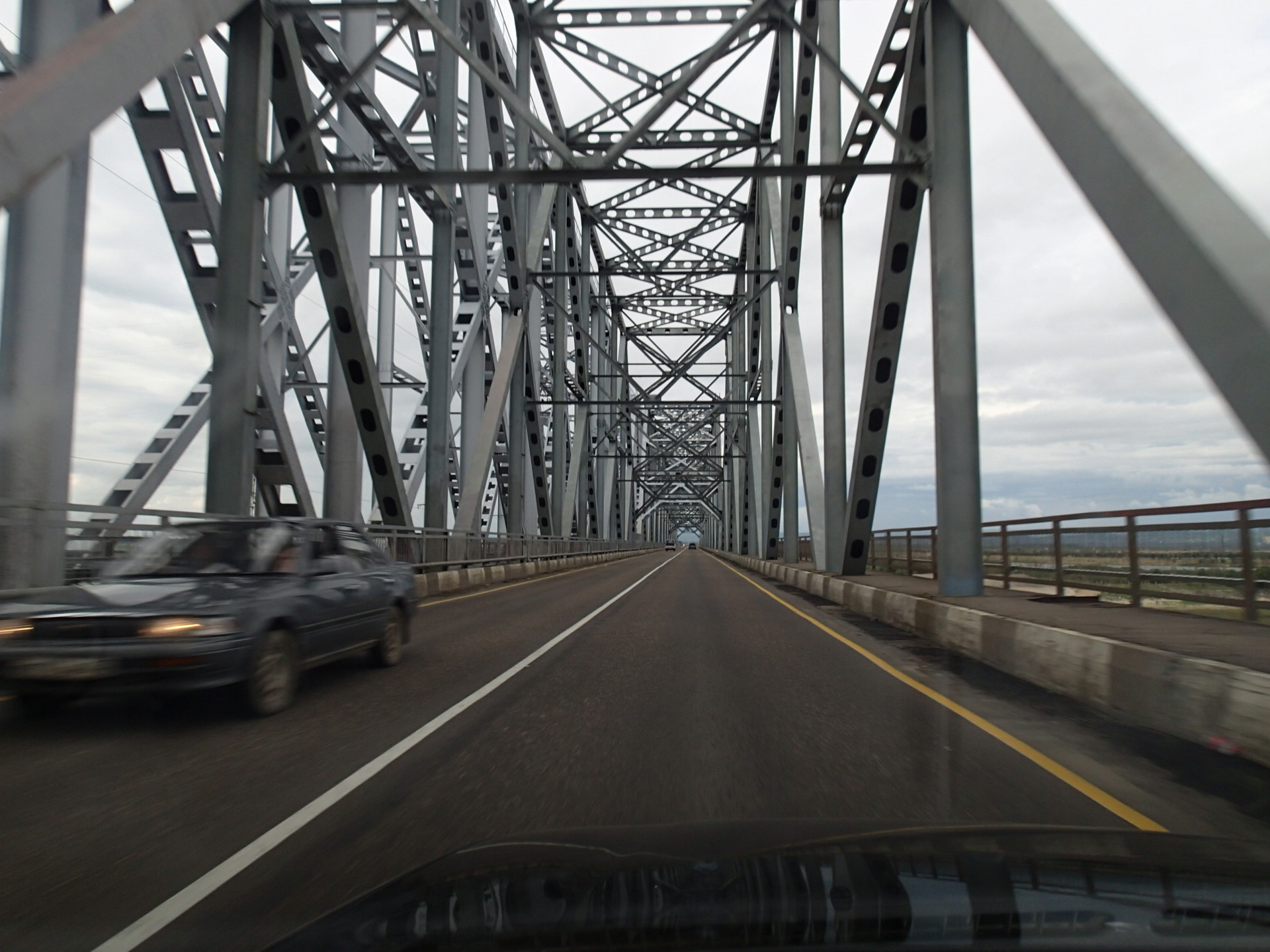
The Amur River Bridge

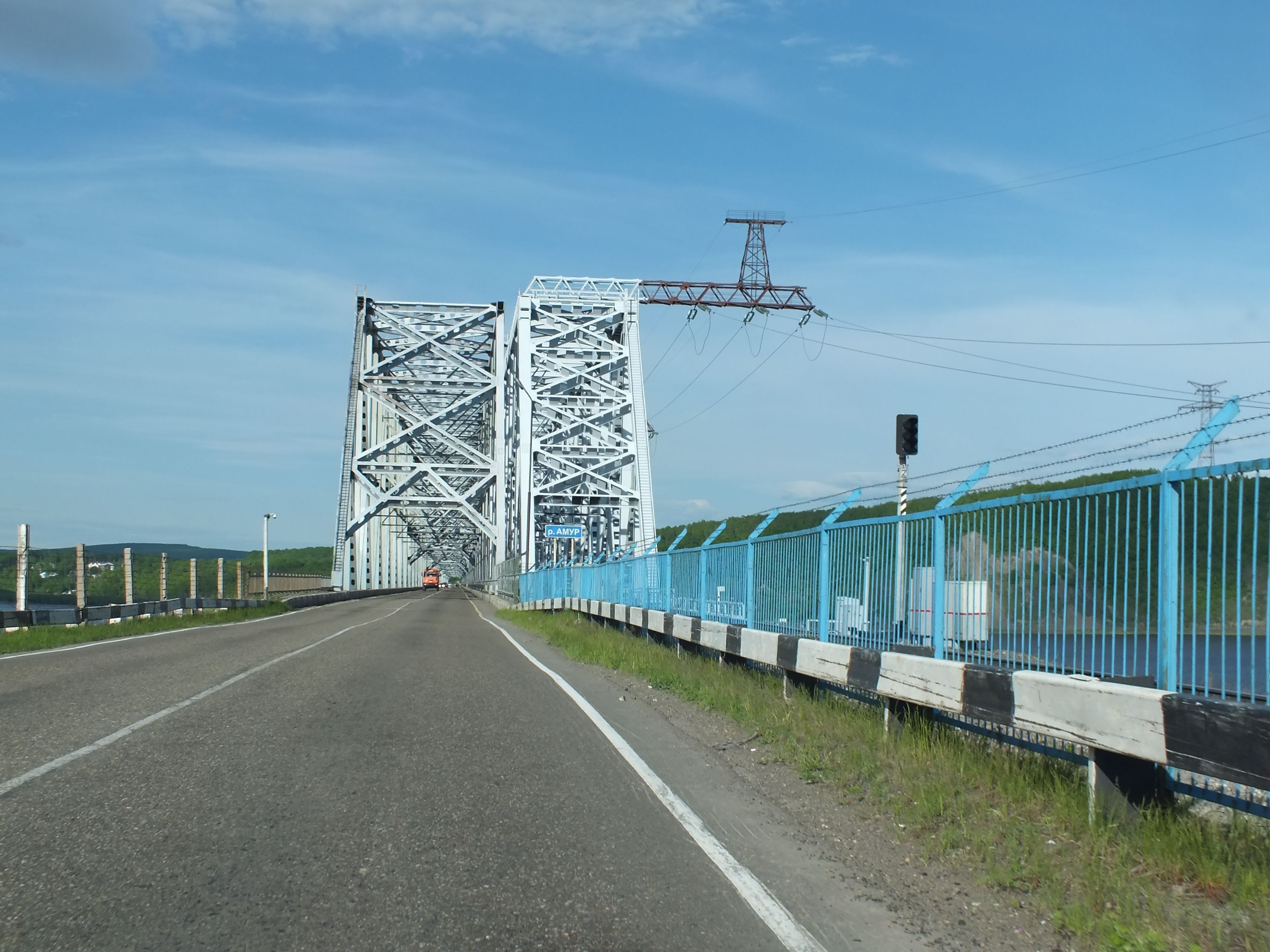
The bridge with the 220 kV-powerline installed on it

Between the years 1970 and 1971, a groundbreaking construction method was implemented by Prof. Konstantin Silin (1913-1996), marking its debut in the realm of domestic bridge building. This innovative technique involved the erection of pylons on foundations made of ferro-concrete sheaths, measuring 3 meters in diameter. Notably, this approach deviated from the conventional use of caissons, which had long been employed in the construction of expansive and road-rail bridges along the Trans-Siberian railway.

The world's first application of the reactive turbo-drilling method in bridge construction involved anchoring ferro-concrete sheaths into bedrocks. To accomplish this, the RTB-600 series reactive turbodrilling machine was utilized. This innovative machine featured three turbodrilling heads, which facilitated the rotation of a rock-cutting tool resembling roller cones.

Once the sheaths were submerged up to the designated mark, they were then filled with concrete using the tremie method. Following this, a reinforced concrete slab was utilized to connect the sheaths, with the assistance of sheet pile fencing. This slab served as the foundation upon which the piers' bodies were placed.

During the construction process, a total of 304 sheaths with a diameter of 3 metres were manufactured as intermediate supports. These sheaths were made of ferro-concrete and were designed according to a unified plan by Lengiprotrans. Concrete of Class М400 (B30) was used for its strength, while concrete of Class F300 was used to ensure frost resistance. To reinforce the sheaths, rebar cages were pre-installed inside with steel grades ranging from A-I to A-II. These cages were made of rebar with diameters between 10 and 20 mm. To ensure stability and durability, the sheaths were filled with underwater hydraulic monolithic concrete of Class M200 (B15).

The intermediate supports of the bridge are incredibly large prefabricated monolithic structures. These structures were adorned with granite slabs that extended from the edge of the foundations to the high water table section. The slabs were designed with pointed ends that faced upward, resembling cutwaters (or starlings), which also had a vertical cutting surface. The piers of the bridge were covered with granite that was sourced from the Kiesovsky and Trikratninsky deposits.

== Military outposts ==
Military outposts play a crucial role in safeguarding the Baikal-Amur Mainline, with one particularly significant node being the bridge. This bridge serves as a strategic military point, requiring stringent security measures. On either side of the bridge, the river banks are fortified with multiple layers of barbed wire, defensive pillboxes, and control towers, forming an impregnable barrier. It is strictly prohibited for pedestrians and cyclists to access the bridge unless they are part of an organized group. To enhance training exercises, certain military units have even constructed a scaled-down replica of the bridge on the left bank, providing a realistic environment for honing their skills and tactics.

== See also ==
- Khabarovsk Bridge
- Trans-Siberian Railway
