= 1942 in rail transport =

This article lists events related to rail transport that occurred in 1942.

== Events ==
=== January events ===
- January 1 – Government of India takes over Bombay, Baroda and Central India Railway and Assam Bengal Railway, merging the latter with the Eastern Bengal Railway to form the Bengal Assam Railway.

=== April events ===
- April – Union Pacific Railroad's M-10002 streamliner trainset re-enters revenue service to equip the connection between Seattle, Washington, and Portland, Oregon.
- April 29 – LNER A4 4469 Sir Ralph Wedgwood is destroyed in the bombing of York sheds.

=== May events ===
- May 1 – The last pre-war streamliner, the Illinois Central Railroad's refurbished Panama Limited, is put into service.
- May – Deutsche Reichsbahn begins planning for Hitler's proposed pan-European Breitspurbahn 3,000 mm (9 ft 10 1/8 in) broad-gauge railway.
- May – D'Alton Corry Coleman succeeds Sir Edward Wentworth Beatty as president of the Canadian Pacific Railway.

=== June events ===
- June – First deliveries of USATC S200 Class 2-8-2 locomotives, to British Middle East forces. 200 are built to standard gauge.
- June – First USATC S100 Class 0-6-0T switchers enter service in Britain, first of nearly 400 built for service in the European theater.
- June 13 – Service is discontinued on the IRT Second Avenue Line, an elevated railway in Manhattan, New York City.
- June 22 – Work starts on construction of the Burma Railway between Bangkok, Thailand and Rangoon, Burma (now Myanmar), by the Empire of Japan to support its forces in the Burma campaign using the forced labour of Asian civilians and Allied Prisoners of war.

=== July events ===
- July 5 – The multiple unit passenger trainsets used by the Denver and Rio Grande Western Railroad on the Prospector between Denver, Colorado, and Salt Lake City, Utah, are removed from revenue service; the train is now equipped with standard locomotives and unpowered passenger cars.
- July 11
  - A section of the Sind Peshin State Railway in the Chappar Rift, in modern-day Pakistan, is destroyed by a flash flood; the line has not been rebuilt.
  - Golden Spike ceremony on the Claiborne–Polk Military Railroad, running 50 miles (80 km) from Camp Claiborne to Fort Polk on the Kansas City Southern south of Leesville, Louisiana.

=== August events ===
- August 8 – The Mumbai Rajdhani passenger train is inaugurated in India.

=== September events ===
- September 8 – "Unspiking" ceremony at Promontory Summit as the original Central Pacific/Union Pacific line is torn up. The rails will be re-laid in Navy Yards throughout the United States.

=== October events ===
- October 1 – United States Army 770th Railway Operating Battalion takes operational control of the narrow gauge White Pass and Yukon Route for construction of the Alaska Highway.

=== November events ===
- November 25–26 – Operation Harling: A British Special Operations Executive team, together with Greek Resistance fighters, blows up the Gorgopotamos viaduct in the first major sabotage act in occupied continental Europe, cutting the enemy-controlled rail line between Thessaloniki and Athens.

=== December events ===
- December – Ian Allan publishes his first book, ABC of Southern Locomotives, the first in a popular series which encourages the hobby of trainspotting in Britain.
- December – Rail transport in Libya: Western Desert Extension Railway reaches Tobruk.
- December – First deliveries of USATC S118 Class "MacArthur" 2-8-2 locomotives, to Nigeria. There will eventually be nearly 800 built to the same basic design, seeing service on every continent, on 3 ft 6 in (1,067 mm) or metre gauge.
- December 6 – Schedules of fast trains around the United States are slightly lengthened to reduce wear and tear, following a wartime decision by the Office of Defense Transportation.
- December 11 – USATC S160 Class 2-8-0 #1604 (built by Alco) is officially handed over on loan to the British government at London Paddington station, from the first batch of 2120 for service in the European theater.
- December 27 – Almonte, Ontario, Canada: Thirty-six people are killed and over 200 injured when a passenger train running late is struck from behind by a troop train.

=== Unknown date events ===
- Samuel Hopkins Adams publishes his novel The Harvey Girls commemorating the Harvey House chain of restaurants and hotels that served passengers of the Atchison, Topeka and Santa Fe Railway.
- Grizzly Flats Railroad, the first full-size (3 ft (914 mm) gauge) backyard railroad in the United States, is opened by Disney animator Ward Kimball at his home in San Gabriel, California.
