= Grandfather Stories =

Book by Samuel Hopkins Adams

- Cover of hardback Book-of-the-Month Club edition
- Author: Samuel Hopkins Adams
- Language: English
- Genre: Folklore, Historical fiction, Reminiscence
- Publisher: Random House, Inc.
- Publication date: 1955
- Publication place: United States
- Media type: Print (Hardcover)
- Pages: 312 pp

Grandfather Stories is a book of 23 historical tales by journalist and novelist Samuel Hopkins Adams. Three were originally published in Woman's Day and 15 in The New Yorker. Most of the stories take place in upper New York State, along the Erie Canal. Those stories told by his grandfather occur in the 1820s; others, when Adams was a boy in the 1870s and 1880s. Adams does not state how much of the tales is fact and how much is fiction; some are clearly his own memoirs, others are historical fiction, and still others seem to be a reconstruction of his grandfather's life experiences.

On the book's publication, the New York Times reviewer, Carl Carmer raved, "Few recent presentations of the national past—fictional or factual—carry so much detailed background, authentic, feeling atmosphere and engaging charm."

A distinctive feature of the book is Adams's liberal use of his grandfather's archaic vocabulary and phrasings. "He has...the ability to bring obsolete words back to us with all their old life and vigor." The book has been referenced by scholars of American speech and as a primary source in historical research on the early days of the Erie Canal.

Most of the sketches begin with the young Adams and his cousins sitting uncomfortably in their grandfather's parlor in Rochester, New York, hoping to distract him into telling a story instead of improving their morals. Myron Adams had had a colorful youth; in the early 1820s, his father won a contract to dig a section of the Erie Canal. As a result, he became an insider among canal folk. He was a well-respected businessman in the region: as such, he traveled frequently through upstate New York. Among his adventures, he was selected as judge for a pie-eating contest, watched the daredevil Sam Patch jump to his death from Rochester's High Falls, charmed the visiting English feminist Frances Wright, helped a runaway slave escape to Canada, and was present, Adams maintains, at the very first preview of the motion picture.

The tales are nuggets of social history: among them, New Year customs in Rochester's elite "ruffleshirt" Third Ward, early professional baseball in Rochester, the corrupt matches that killed off professional rowing, and the invention of the detachable shirt collar in Troy, New York. Adams describes his meeting as a boy with the abolitionist and slave-rescuer Harriet Tubman, who was helped by his family after she settled in nearby Auburn.

Grandfather Stories has been suggested as a travel guide to Upstate New York.
