= Samuel Hopkins Adams =

American investigative journalist (1871–1958)

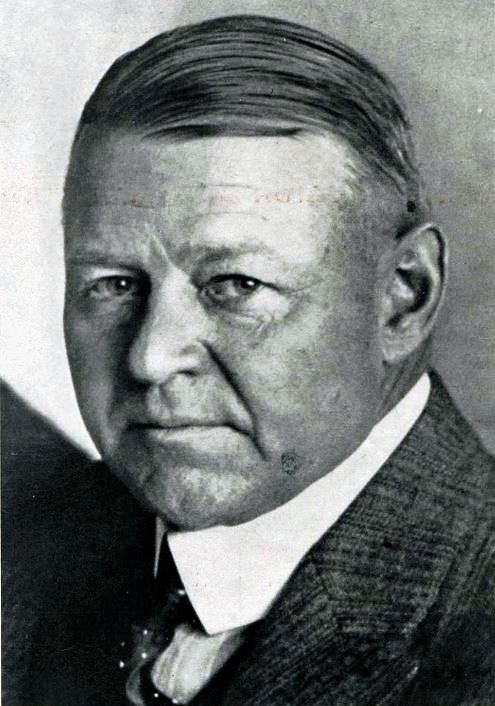
- Adams in 1922
- Born: January 26, 1871; Dunkirk, New York, US
- Died: November 16, 1958 (aged 87); Beaufort, South Carolina, US
- Education: Hamilton College
- Occupations: Author, journalist
- Known for: Muckraking journalism; It Happened One Night; The Gorgeous Hussy; The Harvey Girls
- Spouses: Elizabeth R. Noyes; Jane Peyton Van Norman

Samuel Hopkins Adams (January 26, 1871 – November 16, 1958) was an American writer who was an investigative journalist and muckraker.

== Background ==
Adams was born in Dunkirk, New York. Adams was a muckraker, known for exposing public-health injustices. He was the son of Myron Adams, Jr., a minister, and Hester Rose Hopkins. Adams attended Hamilton College in Clinton, New York from 1887 to 1891. He also attended a semester at Union College. In 1907, Adams divorced his wife, Elizabeth Ruffner Noyes, after having two daughters. Eight years later Adams married an actress, Jane Peyton. Adams was a close friend of both the investigative reporter Ray Stannard Baker and District Attorney Benjamin Darrow.

== Career ==
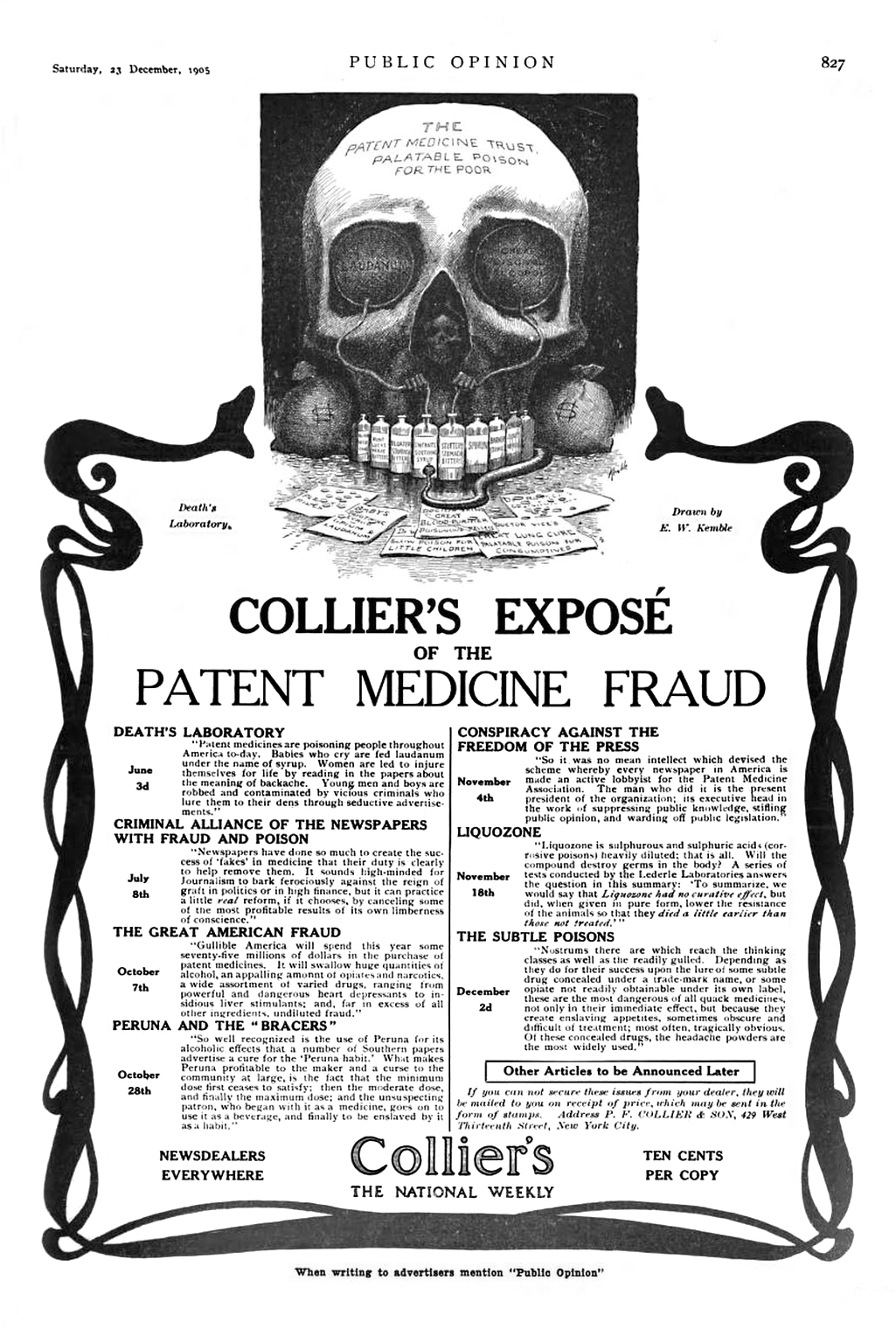
December 1905 advertisement for Collier's magazine's exposé of the patent medicine fraud, culminating in Samuel Hopkins Adams' 11-part series, "The Great American Fraud"

From 1891 to 1900, he was a reporter for the New York Sun where his career began, and then joined McClure's Magazine, where he gained a reputation as a muckraker for his articles on the conditions of public health in the United States. In 1904, Adams became an editorial staffer with McClure's Magazine working with Lincoln Steffens, Ida Tarbell, and Ray Stannard Baker. Adams considered himself a freelance writer and used his writings to support himself. In 1905, Adams was hired by Collier's to prepare articles on patent medicines. In a series of 11 articles he wrote for the magazine in 1905, "The Great American Fraud", Adams exposed many of the false claims made about patent medicines, pointing out that in some cases these medicines were damaging the health of the people using them. The series had a huge impact and led to the passage of the Pure Food and Drug Act of 1906. In 1911, the Supreme Court ruled that the prohibition of falsifications referred only to the ingredients of the medicine. This meant that companies were again free to make false claims about their products. Adams returned to the attack, and in another series of articles in Collier's Weekly, Adams exposed the misleading advertising that companies were using to sell their products. Linking his knowledge of newspapers with patent medicines, he wrote The Clarion (1914), which was critical of newspaper advertising practices and led to a series of consumer-protection articles in the New York Tribune. His service during World War I for the Committee on Public Information led to Common Cause (1919), a novel on a newspaper's battle against pro-Germans in Wisconsin.

== Literary works ==
Adams was a prolific writer, who wrote fiction as well. “Night Bus” (1933), one of his many magazine stories, became the basis for the 1934 film ‘’It Happened One Night‘’. Adams’ first solo novel was in 1908, ‘’Flying Death’’, which added to his mystery collection. His best-known novel, ‘’Revelry’’ (1926), based on the scandals of the Warren G. Harding administration, was later followed by ‘’Incredible Era’’ (1939), a biography of Harding.

Among his other works are ‘’The Great American Fraud’’ in ‘’Collier's‘’ (1905–06), ‘’The Mystery’’ (1907), with S. E. White, ‘’Average Jones’’ (1911), ‘’The Secret of Lonesome Cove’’ (1912), ‘’The Health Master’’ (1913), ‘’The Clarion’’ (1914), ‘’The Unspeakable Perk’’ (1916), ‘’Our Square and the People in It’’ (1917), ‘’Success’’ (1921), ‘’Siege’’ (1924), ‘’The Gorgeous Hussy’’ (1934), ‘’Maiden Effort’’ (1937), ‘’The Harvey Girls‘’ (1942; adapted into the 1946 movie musical starring Judy Garland), ‘’Canal Town’’ (1944), ‘’Plunder’’ (1948), ‘’Grandfather Stories‘’ (1955), “Chingo Smith of the Erie Canal” (1958) and m. ‘’Average Jones’’ is a series of stories about a detective investigating fraudulent or unusual advertisements. In addition to his many books, Adams also wrote 415 short stories and articles.

‘’Tenderloin’’ described the battle between Charles H. Parkhurst and Tammany Hall. ‘’The New York Times‘’ reviewer H. I. Brock called the book an “outstanding period piece” and “a finale to a long and varied writing career”. ‘’Tenderloin’’ was adapted into a 1960 musical with book by George Abbott and Jerome Weidman and songs by Jerry Bock and Sheldon Harnick, the team that had created ‘’Fiorello!‘’ ‘’Tenderloin’’ ran for 216 performances. New critic Howard Taubman praised the songs, but complained about a “dragging book” and said, “The wages of virtue, alas, are largely dullness.”

Adams also published a biography of Alexander Woollcott (1945) and three books for the Landmark Series, ‘’The Pony Express’’ (1950), ‘’The Santa Fe Trail’’ (1952), and ‘’The Erie Canal’’ (1953).

The printing of his 1947 novel ‘’Banner by the Wayside’’ was the subject of an ‘’Encyclopædia Britannica’’ documentary on the manufacture of hardback books (see external links). Adams last book, ‘’Tenderloin’’ (1959), was published after his death and was later adapted into a Broadway musical.

== Risqué novels ==
In the 1920s and 1930s, Adams, under the pseudonym of Warner Fabian, wrote several novels that at the time were considered highly risqué. These titillating works, which mainly featured young women flappers and their trials and tribulations of early adulthood, often became best-sellers avidly read by Jazz Age youth. Flaming Youth, Adams' first novel of this sort, dealt with the sexual urges of young women and had a sexual frankness that was shocking for its time. Because of the nature of the novels, Adams utilized the Fabian pseudonym so that his more standard works would not be tainted by any scandal accruing to these novels. Most of these novels were later brought to the screen, including Flaming Youth starring Colleen Moore; Sailors' Wives, with Mary Astor in the lead; and The Wild Party featuring Clara Bow.

Novels published under the pseudonym "Warner Fabian" include:

- Flaming Youth (New York: The Macaulay Company, 1924)
- Sailors' Wives (New York: Boni & Liveright, 1924)
- Summer Bachelors (New York: Boni & Liveright, 1926; The Macaulay Company, 1927)
- Unforbidden Fruit (New York: Boni & Liveright, 1928; Cleveland & New York: International Fiction Library, 1928)

- Serialized in The Smart Set, 1928

- The Men in Her Life (New York: Sears Publishing Co., 1930; Grosset & Dunlap, 1930)
- Week-End Girl (New York: The Macaulay Company, 1932)
- Widow's Oats (New York: The Macaulay Company, 1935)

== Later life and death ==
Adams had a winter residence in Beaufort, South Carolina. He died in Beaufort on November 16, 1958, at the age of 87.

He was cremated and his ashes were scattered at his home at Owasco Lake in New York State.

Adams's papers are archived in academic libraries, including Syracuse University, Hamilton College, and Harvard University. A significant portion of his collections are located at the American Antiquarian Society in Worcester, Massachusetts.

== Selected publications ==
- The Great American Fraud (1912)
- The Wealth Master
- The Great American Fraud
- Average Jones
- Success: A Novel
- The Mystery
- Flaming Youth
- The Secret of Lonesome Cove
- Wanted: A Husband. A Novel
- The Clarion
- Our Square and the People in It
- The Flying Death
- Little Miss Grouch
- Common Cause: A Novel of the War in America
- The Health Master
- The Beggar's Purse: A Fairy Tale of Familiar Finance
- The Unspeakable Perk
- From a Bench in Our Square

== Selected filmography ==
- Wandering Fires (1925)
- Summer Bachelors (1926)
- The Wild Party (1929), based on the novel Unforbidden Fruit
- What Men Want (1930)
- Men in Her Life (1931)
- Week Ends Only (1932)
- It Happened One Night (1934), based on the short story "Night Bus"
- The Gorgeous Hussy (1936), based on Adams' novel of the same title
- The Harvey Girls (1946), based on Adams' novel of the same title
