= List of historic properties in Holbrook, Arizona =

- Town
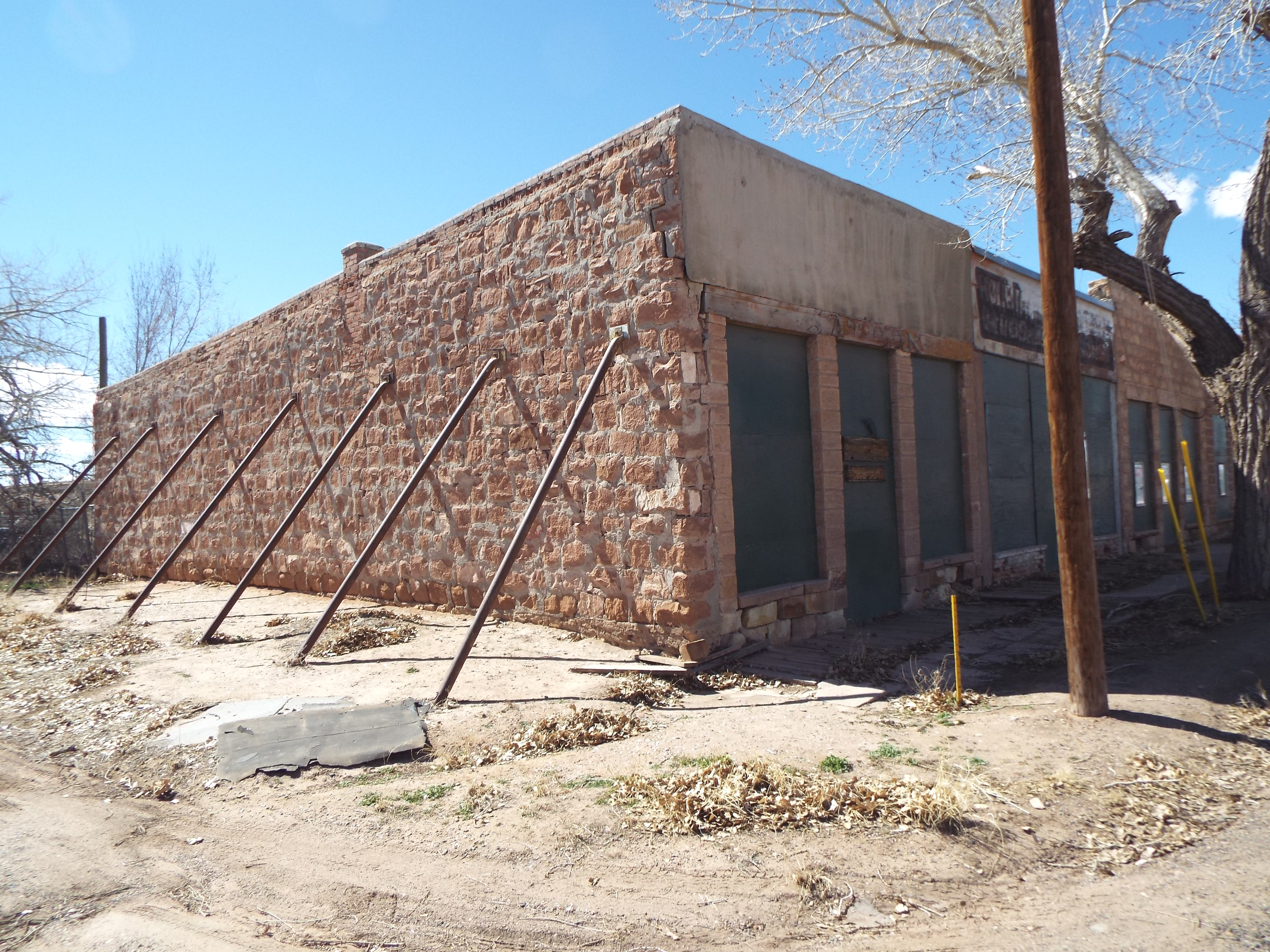
- South Central Avenue Commercial Historic District

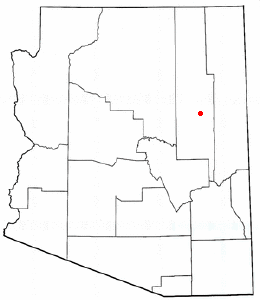
- Map of Holbrook in the Navajo County of the state of Arizona

This is a list which includes a photographic gallery, of historic structures in Holbrook, a city in Navajo County, Arizona, United States. Some of the structures of historical significance are listed in the National Register of Historic Places. Other structures, which are located on the historic Route 66 are eligible to be listed in National Register of Historic Places in accordance to the "Route 66 in Arizona Survey Report". Holbrook was founded in 1881, and incorporated in 1917.

== Brief history ==
The first known inhabitants of the Holbrook area were the Pre-Columbian Puebloans and Anasazi. The Agate House built by the Puebloans, made out of petrified wood in the Petrified Forest, serves as evidence that they inhabited that area approximately from the year 900 to 1200 AD. The Anasazi pueblo village compound in the forest was inhabited from 1250 to 1350 AD. It contains over 100 rooms and kivas. The area was later inhabited by the Hopi, Navajos and Apaches. The Navajos and Apaches often fought each other and against the Puebloans.

The first Europeans to arrive in the area were the Spanish conquistadores. Captain Don Garcia de Cardenas and his party arrived in Arizona, which at the time was part of "New Mexico", in 1540. Francisco Vázquez de Coronado searched for the Seven Cities of Cibola and camped some sixty miles east of what was to become Holbrook. Coronado sent an expedition west to find the Colorado River, and they crossed the Little Colorado River some twenty-five miles east of the future Holbrook site and found a colorful area which they named "El Desierto Pintada" (The Painted Desert). The expedition was then led by the Hopis to the Grand Canyon. The area became part of Mexico when Mexico gained its independence from Spain.

=== United States Territory ===
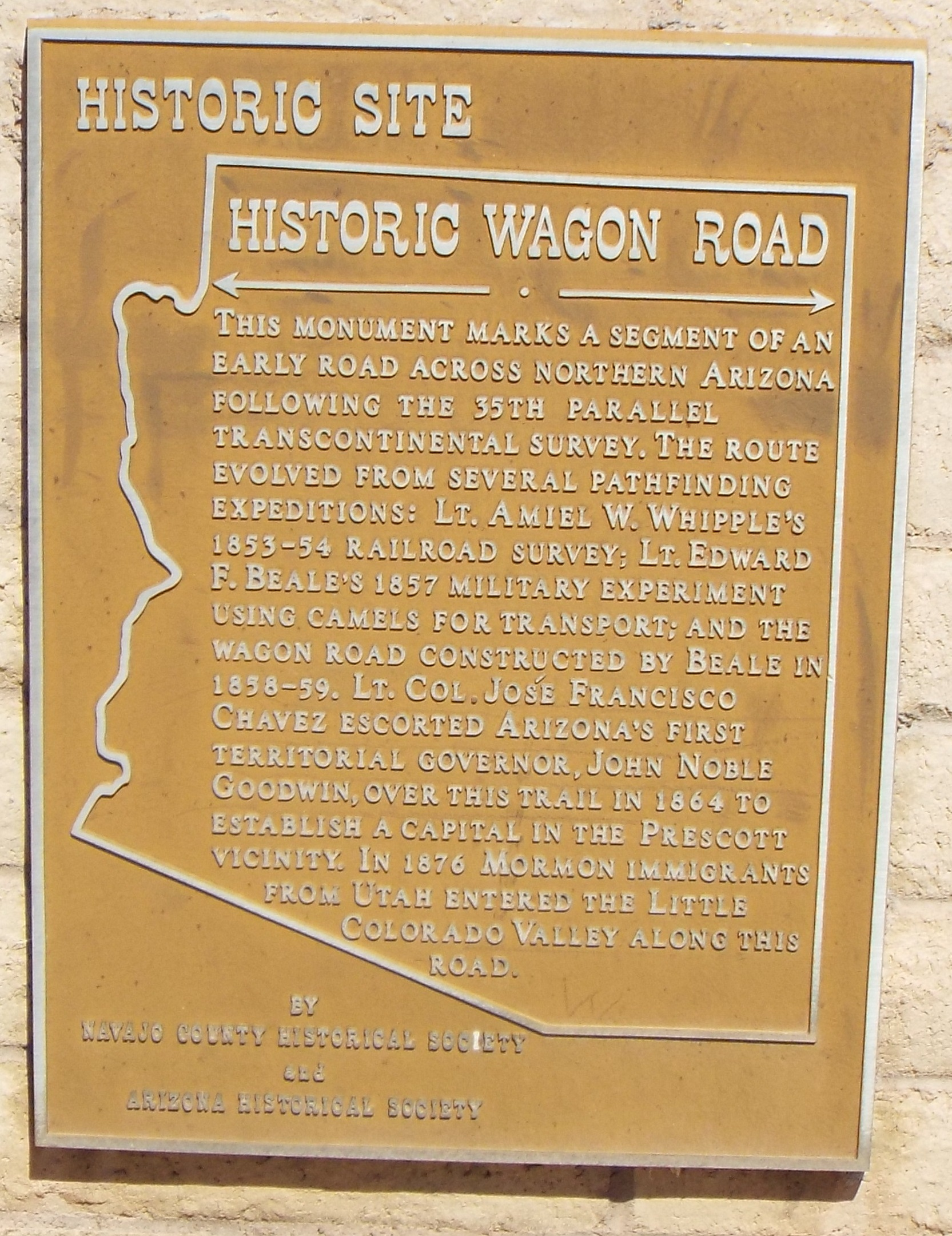
Wagon Road Marker

The United States fought against Mexico in what is known as the Mexican–American War. The war ended officially when the 1848 Treaty of Guadalupe Hidalgo was signed and forced onto the remnant Mexican government. It specified its major consequence, the Mexican Cession of the northern territories of Alta California and Santa Fe de Nuevo México to the United States.

From 1851 to 1857 the U.S. Army sent three expeditions along the 35th parallel. the company led by Lt.Edward Fitzgerald Beale built a ten foot wide wagon road known as Beale's Wagon Road. The area was known as Navajo Springs, after a spring a dozen miles northeast of Holbrook. Soon afterwards a store and saloon were established at the confluence of the Rio Puerco and Little Colorado Rivers two miles east of what was to become Holbrook, and the area became known as the Horsehead Crossing. The wagon road that Lt. Beale built became a popular immigrant trail during the 1860s and 1870s, and it was this survey which marked out for the first time a practicable highway along the 35th parallel that has been used from that day on.

Among the migrants who moved westward through Beale's Wagon Road were members of the Mormon religion who in 1876 founded Joseph City. The Atlantic and Pacific railroad began their expansion westward under the supervision of Henry Randolph Holbrook, the railroad chief engineer. The railroad workers set up a camp a mile from Joseph City (at the time the city was called St. Joseph City). Later, they established a temporary railroad station at Horsehead Crossing in present-day Holbrook. John W. Young, a grading contractor, named the station "Holbrook" in honor of the A & P chief engineer. The name stuck and on September 24, 1881, after the railroad reached Holbrook Station, the town of Holbrook was founded.

=== Lawlessness ===
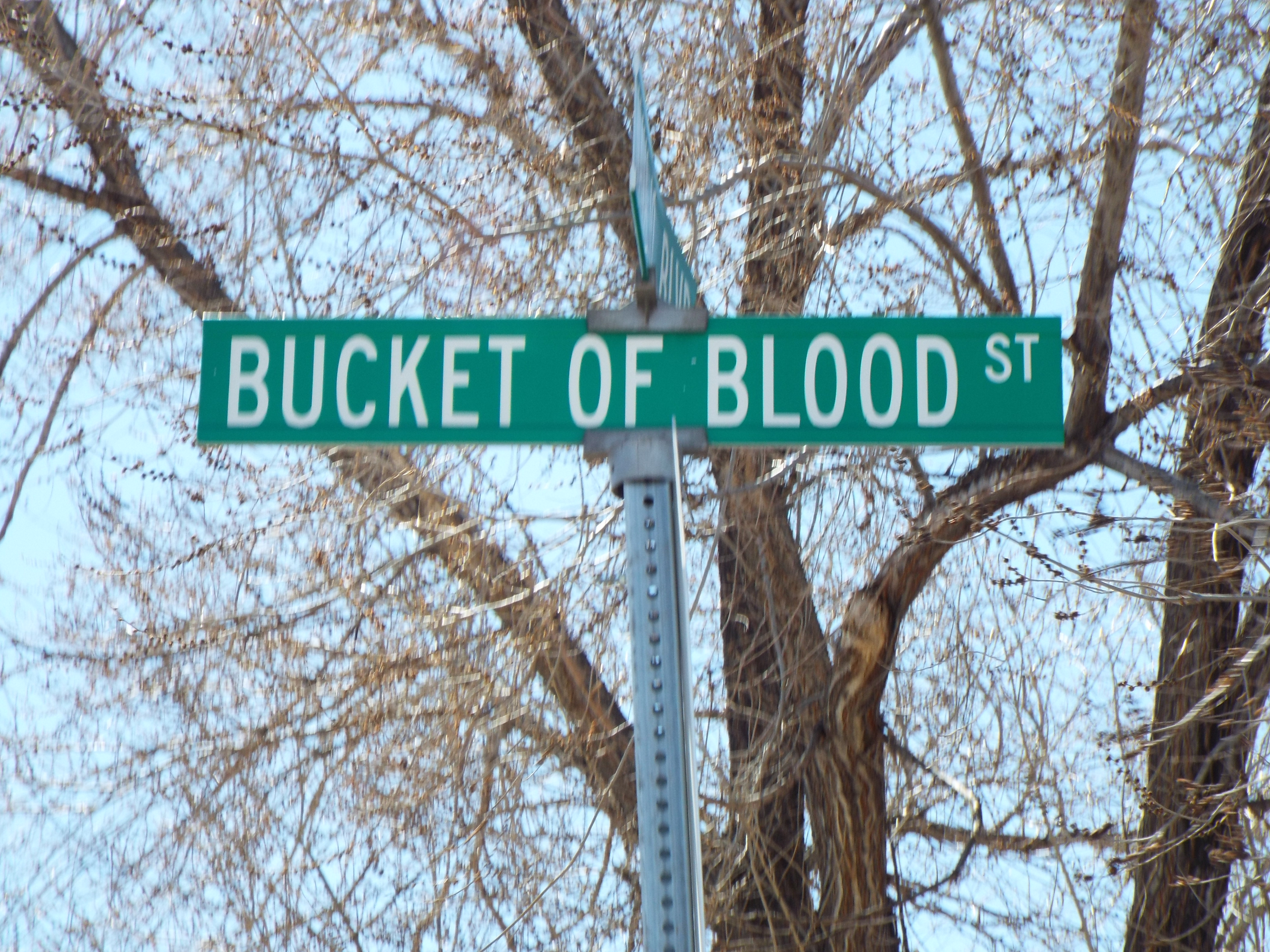
Bucket of Blood Street

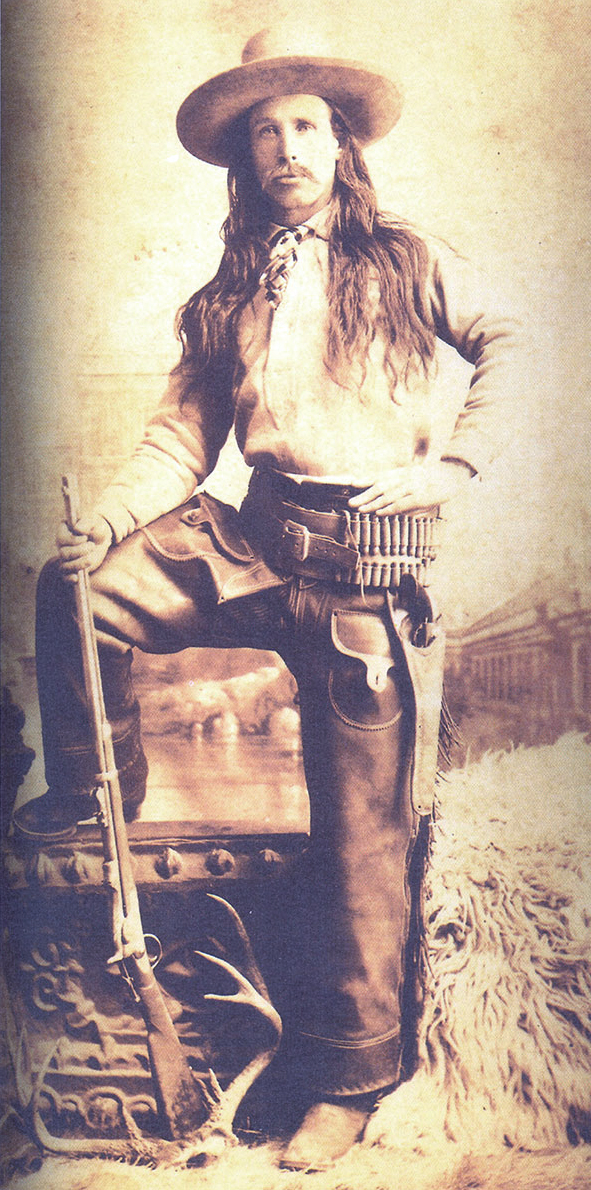
Sheriff Commodore Perry Owens

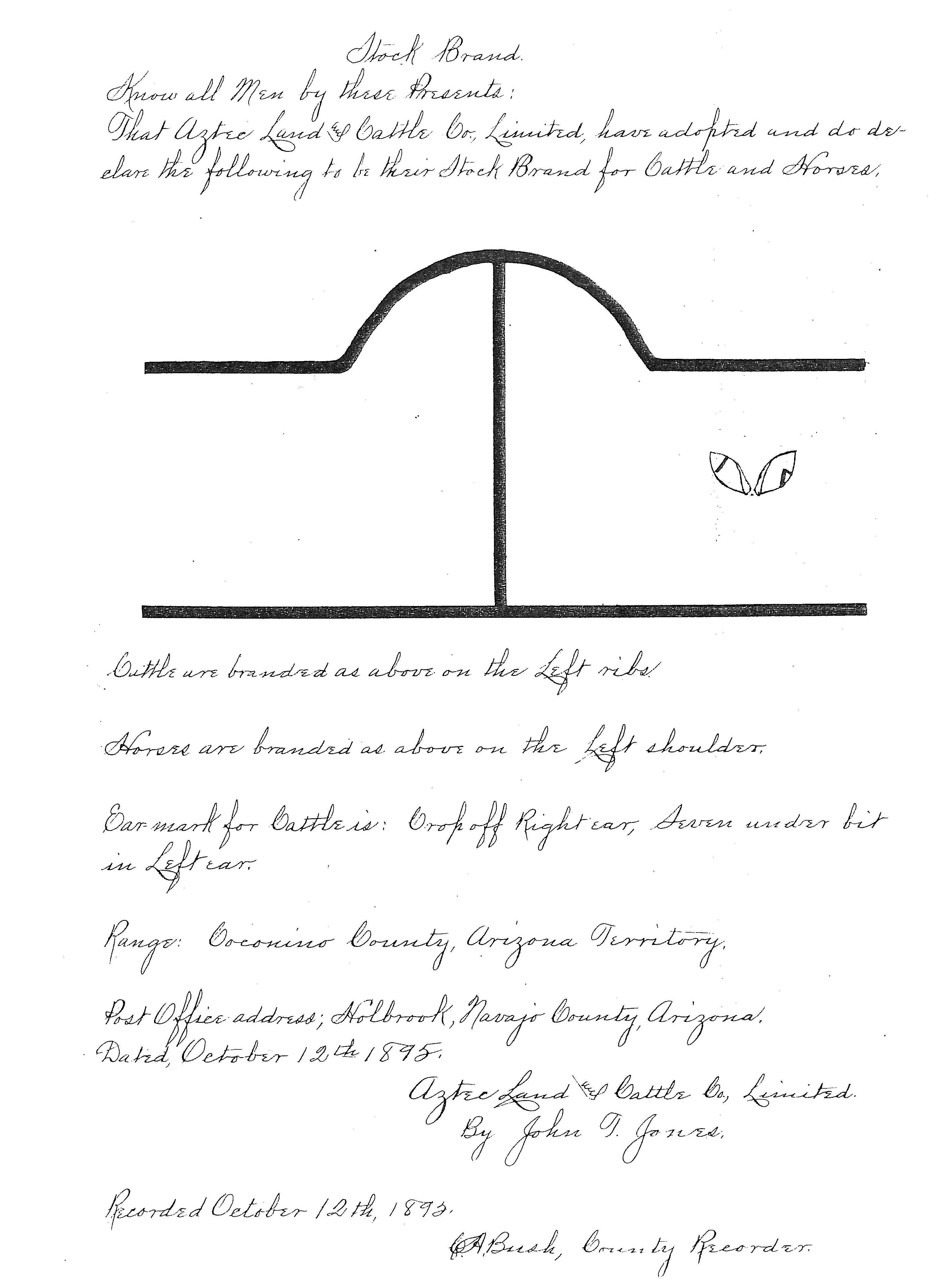
Hashknife Brand

The town became a booming cow-town after the Aztec Land and Cattle Company was established in 1884. The Aztec soon became known as the Hashknife Outfit because their brand resembled the knife used by range-land “chuckwagon” cooks. The company hired cowboys of ill repute who often rode into the main commercial district branding and firing their guns.

Terrill's Cottage Saloon was a popular cowboy gathering place. According to local lore a gunfight took place in 1891 where two men were murdered. There was so much blood spilled on the floors that it looked like a "bucket of blood" and hence the saloon was renamed the Bucket of Blood Saloon. Twenty-six men were killed in what also became known as the Bucket of Blood Street.

Apache Chief Geronimo had been at war with the United States for some time, before surrendering in 1886. On September 13, 1886, some of his people were escorted by the US Cavalry to the Atlantic and Pacific Railroad Depot in Holbrook from Fort Apache and placed on a train which took them to Fort Marion in Florida where they were imprisoned.

Navajo County was split from Apache County on March 21, 1895. There had been a rivalry between the towns of Winslow and Holbrook as to who was to have the County Seat of Navajo. Holbrook received the majority of the votes. The first county sheriff was Commodore Perry Owens, a gunman who had previously served as the sheriff of Apache County. The county was the location of many of the events which occurred during the Pleasant Valley War.

Andy Blevins, a member of the Hashknife Outfit who was wanted in Texas, bragged about killing two men in the Pleasant Valley War. On September 4, 1887, Sheriff Commodore Perry Owens decided to serve Belvins with an arrest warrant. The sheriff went alone to the Belvins house and a shoot out known as the "Holbrook Shout-Out" ensued. Sheriff Owens was fired upon by the occupants of the Blevins house and, in the space of a few seconds, he killed Andy, his brother Sam and Mose Roberts.

The town gained a reputation as being "Too Tough For Women or Churches". Holbrook was said to be the only county seat in the U.S. that didn't have a church. Dr. Sidney Sapp, was the Judge of the Superior Court of Navajo County. He was also, the founder of the "Holbrook News". Judge Sapp was married to Alma Sapp who protested that she will not live in a town without a church. Judge Sapp decided to collect enough funds to establish a church. The Community Church building was finally built in 1912.

Holbrook was affected by two large fires, one in 1888 and another in 1902. Both fires destroyed many of the businesses which were established in the area. Holbrook was also affected by many floods which were harder to control.

=== Holbrook is incorporated ===
On March 6, 1917, the City of Holbrook, which is now known as the "Gateway to the Petrified Forest", was finally incorporated. The first appointed city mayor was W. R. Scorse and the first person who was elected as mayor on May 28, 1917, was George W. Hennesey.

The historic Route 66, which runs through Holbrook, was completed in 1926. The establishment of Route 66 was one of the major factors which contributed to the growth of the city. People who emigrated to the western part of the United States and tourists from different parts of the country often stopped and visited the city. As a consequence many motels were built, among them the Wigwam Motel, also known as the "Wigwam Village #6", located at 811 West Hopi Drive.

Some of the structures in Holbrook are listed in the National Register of Historic places. There are other structures, which according to the "Route 66 in Arizona Survey Report" are eligible to be listed in National Register of Historic Places. The fact that a property is listed in the National Register of Historic Places or that it may be eligible to be listed as such, does not mean that the property is safe from being demolished by its owner. According to Jim McPherson, Arizona Preservation Foundation Board President:

"It is crucial that residents, private interests, and government officials act now to save these elements of our cultural heritage before it is too late."

The Navajo County Historical Society, which is in charge of show casing the legacy given to Holbrook and neighboring areas from its early residents, is located in the historic Navajo County Courthouse. The museum, which is also an official Arizona Visitors Center, has a collection of items related to the history of Holbrook on exhibit. The society's mission is to "collect, preserve and disseminate as a public trust, the heritage of the citizens of Navajo County".

== Structures pictured ==
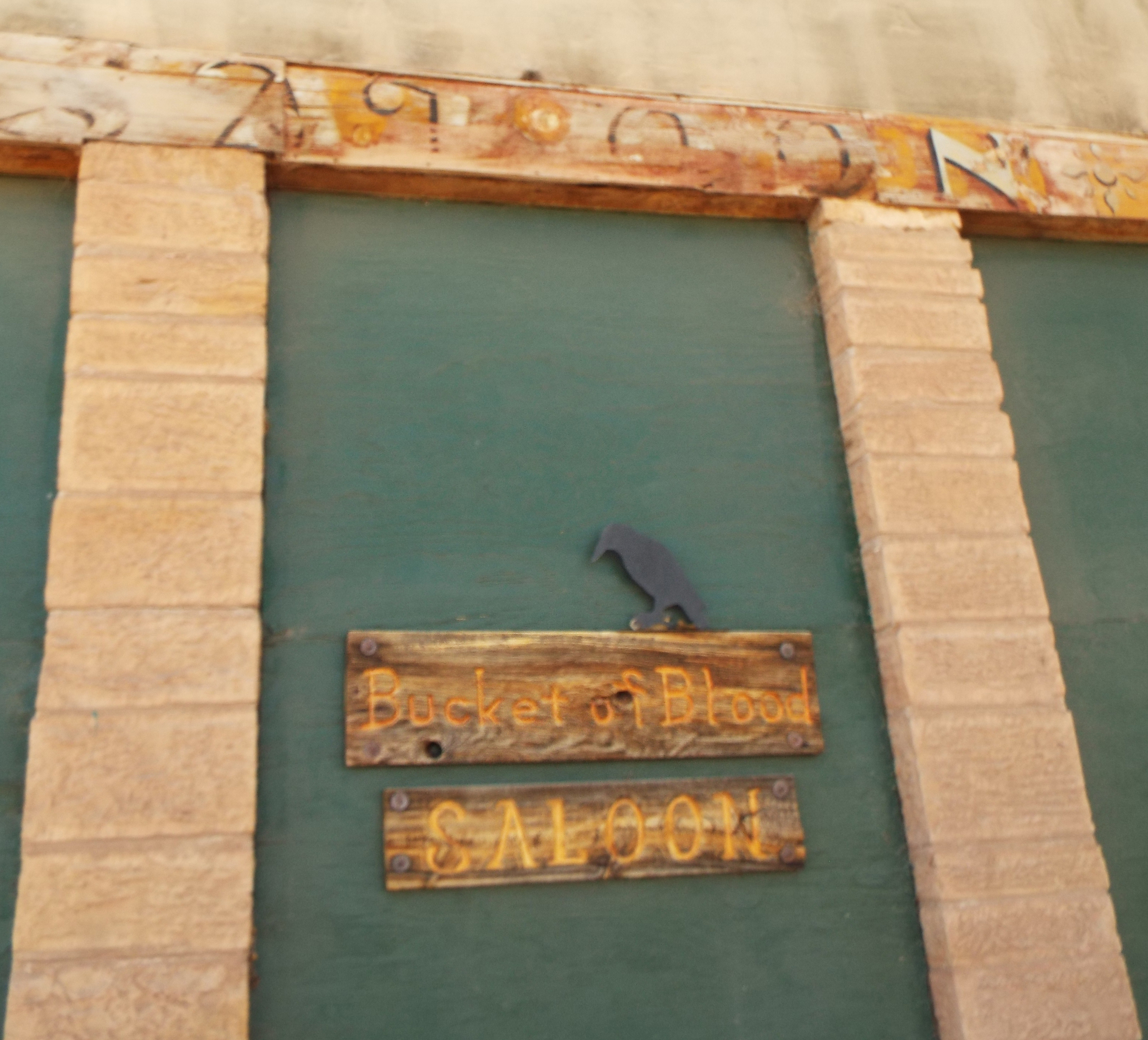
The Bucket of Blood Saloon

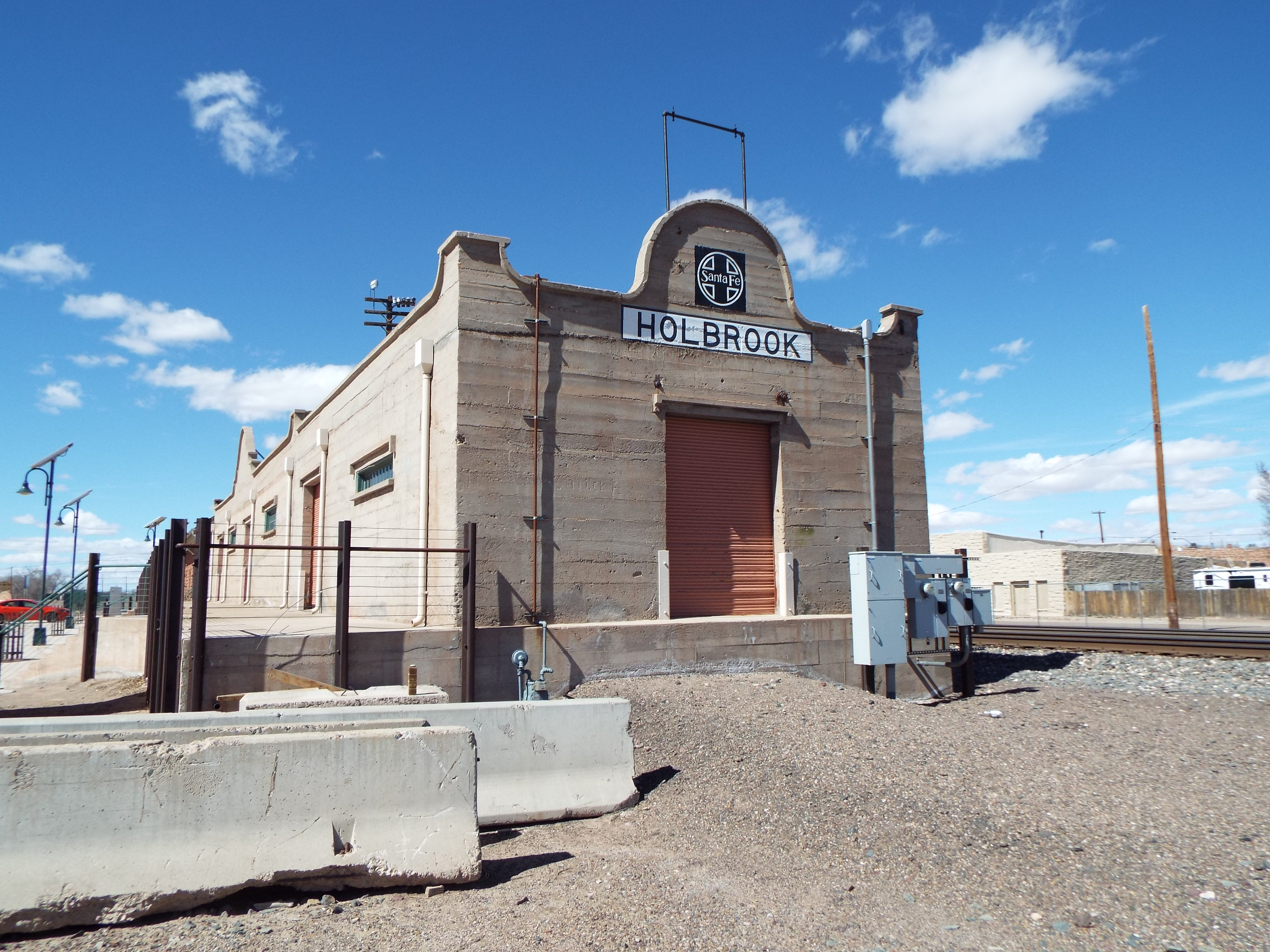
The Santa Fe Railroad Depot

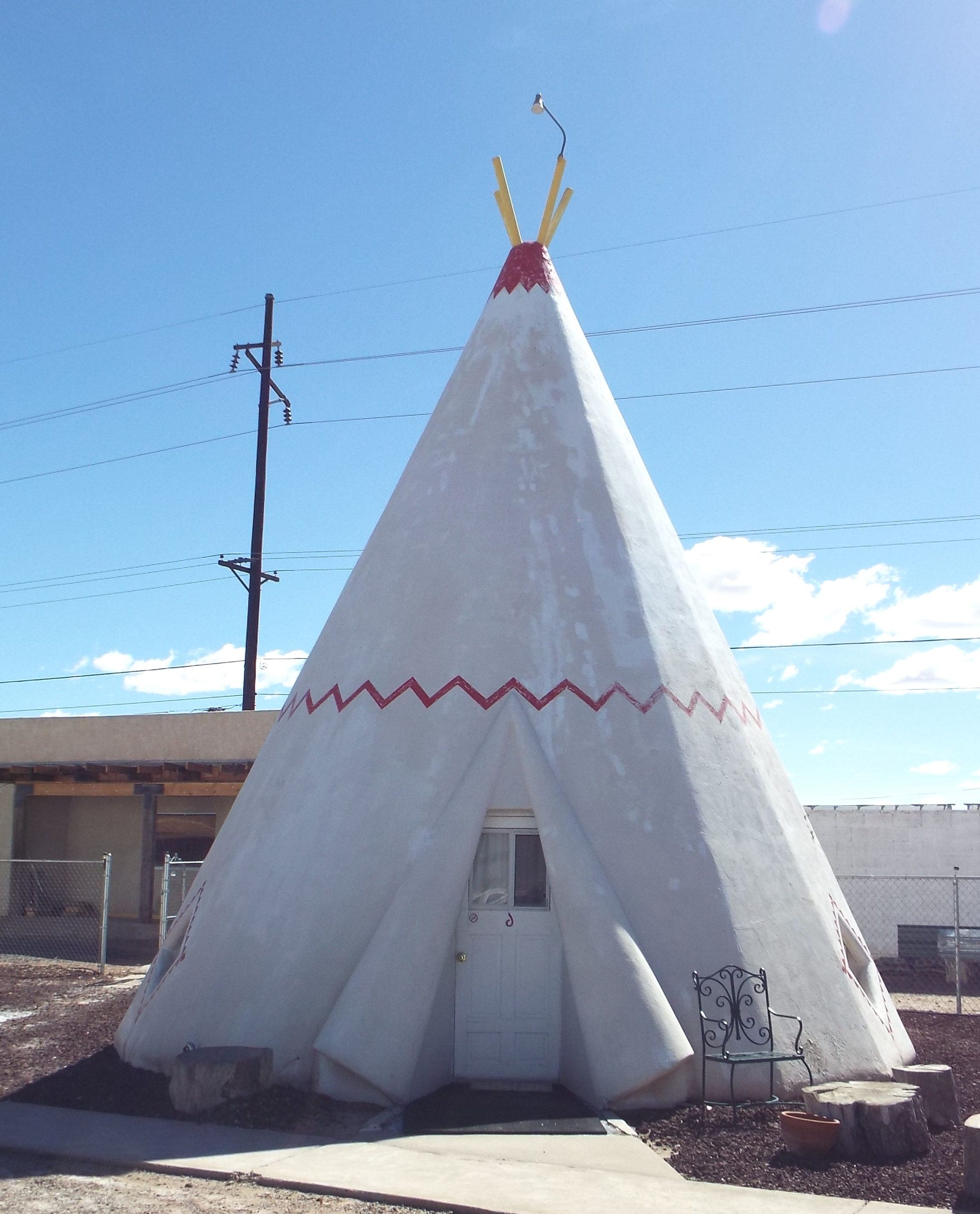
A Wigwam Motel Tepee

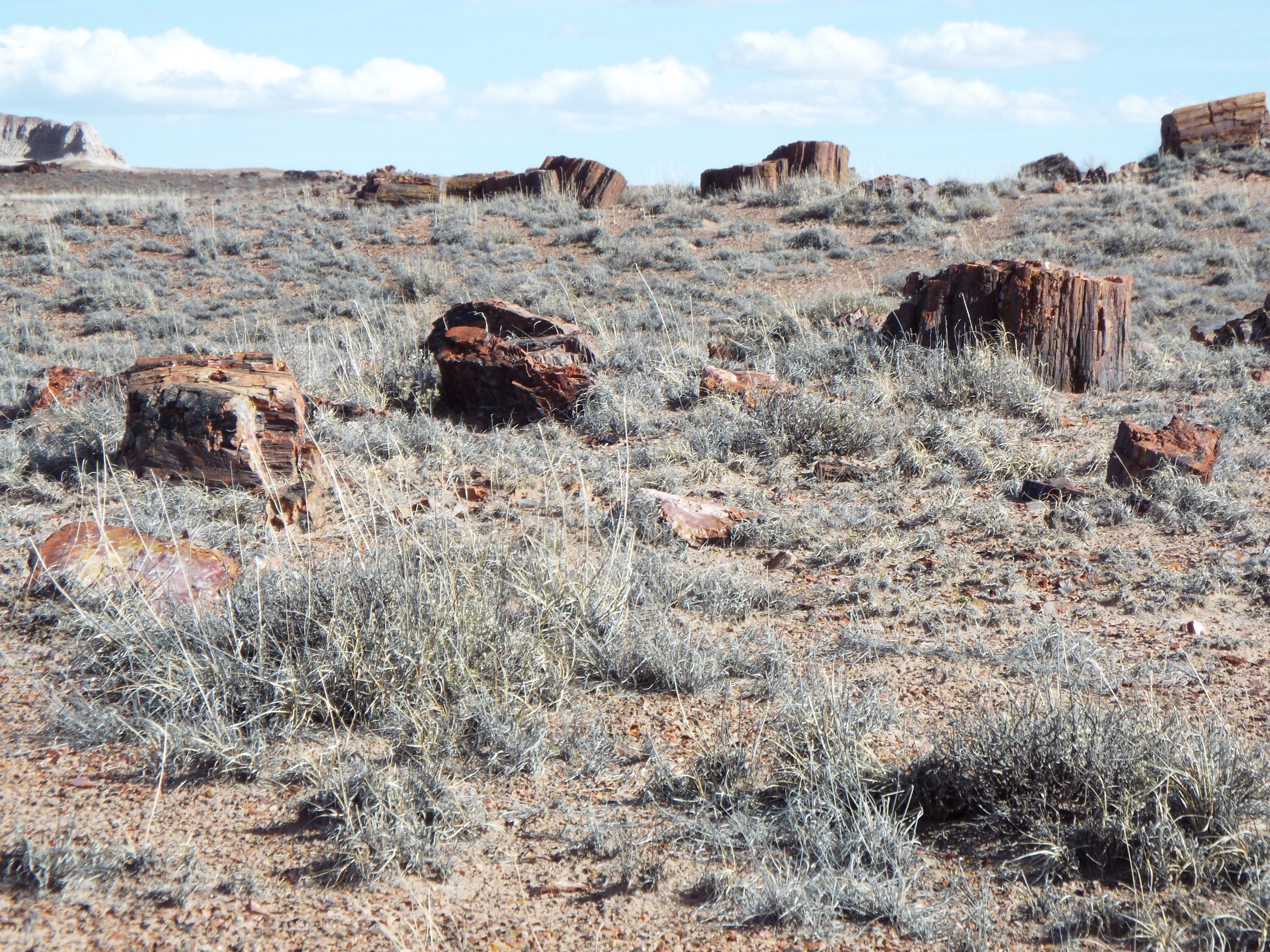
Petrified wood in the Petrified Forest National Park

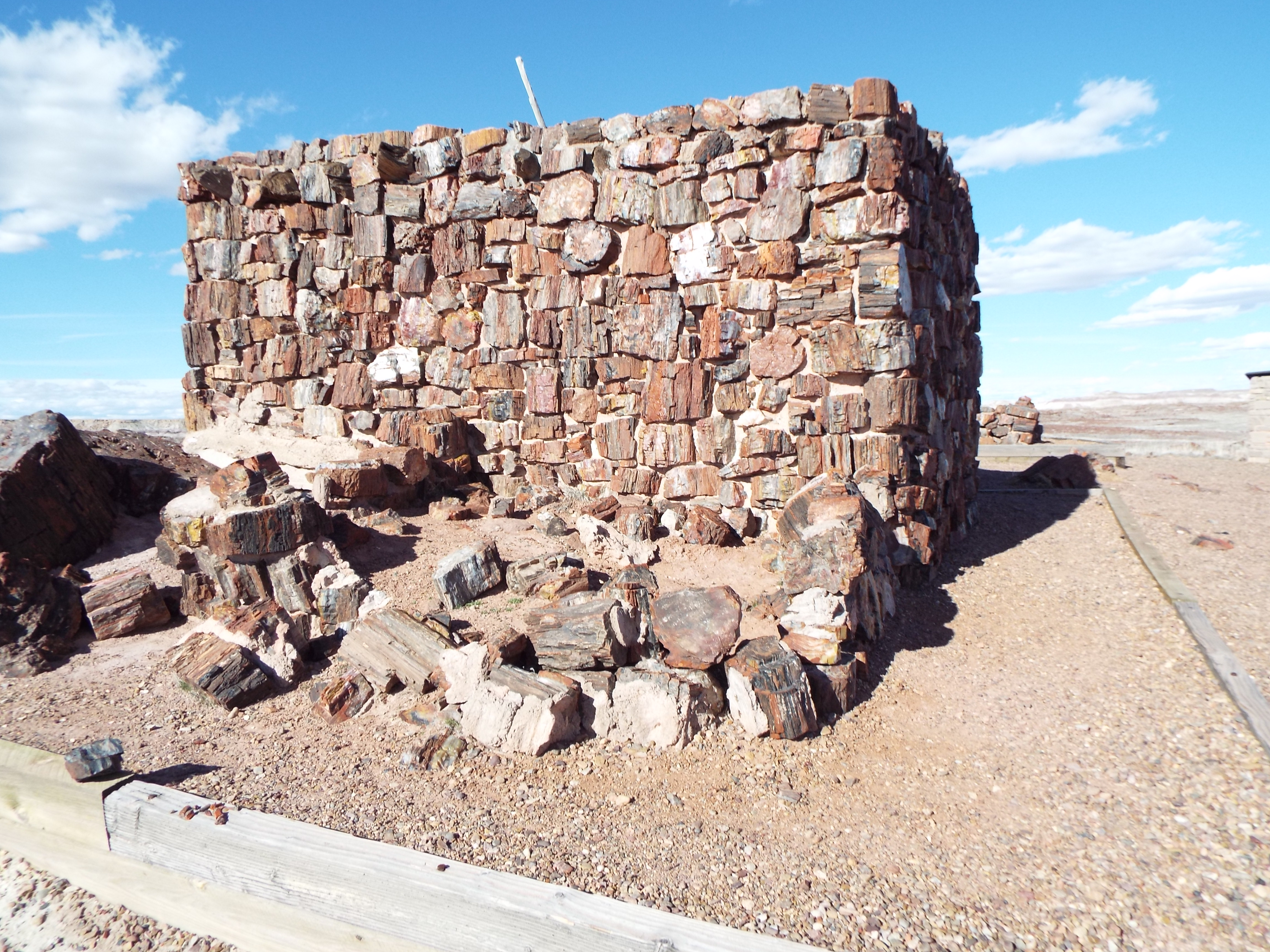
The Agate House

The following is a short description of the structures which are either individually or as part of the historic district, listed in the National Register of Historic Places. Also, pictured are structures which were related to the historic 1887, "Holbrook Shoot Out" between Commodore Perry Owens, the local sheriff, with cattle rustlers.

- Historic Wagon Road Marker located on Joy Nevins Avenue which reads as follows "This monument marks a segment of an early road across northern Arizona following the 35th parallel transcontinental survey. The route evolved from several pathfinding expeditions. Lt. Amiel W Whipple's 1853–54 railroad survey; Lt. Edward F Beale's 1857 military experiment using camels for transport; and the Wagon Road constructed by Beale in 1858–59. Lt. Col. Jose Franvez escorted Arizona's first territorial Governor, John Noble Goodwin, over this trail in 1864 to establish a capitol in the Prescott vicinity. In 1876 Mormon immigrants from Utah entered the Little Colorado Valley along this road."
- The Atlantic and Pacific Railroad Depot was built in 1883 is located at Purple Heart Trail (U.S. Route 180) and E. Bucket of Blood Street. It was in this depot that some of Apaches were brought from Fort Apache in 1886, where they boarded a train for Florida after their leader Geronimo surrendered.
- The Santa Fe Train concrete Depot extension of the historic station was built in 1907.
- The Arizona Rancho was built in 1881 and is located at the Jct. of Tovar and Apache Streets. The Arizona Rancho, also known as the Higgins House, Brunswick Hotel and Arizona Hotel, is a former hotel. It was originally built between 1881 and 1883 as a residence, the expanded as a boarding house, a hotel, and finally as a motel. The original structure is thought to be the oldest extant structure in Holbrook. It was listed in the National Register of Historic Places on October 17, 1997, ref.: #97001210.
- The A & B Schuster Mercantile Company a quarried stone warehouse to the east of the Holbrook Railroad station. The structure was built in 1884 and is located at 200 Navajo Blvd.
- South Central Avenue Commercial Historic District is also known as the "Bucket of Blood Street". The district was listed in the National Register of Historic Places on February 14, 1997, ref.: #97000041. The district consists of the following:
1. The Bucket of Blood Saloon was originally constructed as the Cottage Saloon. It was built in 1888 by Byron Terrill. It is located at 119 Bucket of Blood Street (South Central).
2. The Robinson & Co. Drug Store was built in 1888 by Dr. Thomas P. Robinson. Deputy Sheriff Frank J. Wattron was a part owner and therefore the building was commonly known as Wattron's Drug Store.
3. The Pioneer Saloon was built in 1889, by Henry H. Scorse. Used as a billiard hall after prohibition.
4. The H.H. Scorse Mercantile was built in 1890, by Henry H. Scorse. Leased by Scorse in 1896 to Julius Wetzler for the Wetzler Brothers mercantile store and after 1900 operated as Henry H. Scorse mercantile.
5. The Young T. Company Warehouse built in 1900 The Warehouse belonged to John W. Young. Young was the grading contractor for Atlantic and Pacific Railroad. He named the railroad station "Holbrook" in honor of chief engineer, Henry R. Holbrook.
6. The Dusty River Grocery Store now houses the Dusty River Antiques, the building was built 1900 and is located at 105 Bucket of Blood Street.
7. The Horsehead Crossing Deli and Ice Cream Parlor was built in 1900 and is located at 112 Bucket of Blood St. Horsehead Crossing had been an important point for several years. The crossing was the forerunner of Holbrook.
- The Navajo County Sheriff office, also known as the "Home of the Hashknife gang posse". The structure was built in 1882 and is located on 205 Joy Nevin Ave. The Aztec Land and Cattle Company was created in 1884. The company employed cowboys and many of them were criminal fugitives from other states. They became known as the Hashknife Outfit because their brand resembled the knife used by rangeland “chuckwagon” cooks. The many cowboys hired by the company delighted in racing into town, yelling and brandishing their six-guns, and often shooting out any lights they saw. Because of their activities, Holbrook became known as the toughest and most lawless town in the west. Within the period of one year, twenty-six shooting victims succumbed. In 1957, Sheriff Ben Pearson had his office in this building. He formed the Sheriff's Hash Knife Posse.
- The Navajo County Courthouse was built in 1898 and is located at 100 Arizona Street. The first major trial held in the courtroom was that of George Smiley, who was accused of murder. Smiley was found guilty. His was the only hanging carried out from a scaffold at the courthouse. The courthouse now houses the Navajo County Historical Society and was listed on the National Register of Historic Places on July 31, 1978, ref.: #78000556.
- The Blevins House was built in 1885 and is located at Joy Nevin Ave. and Second Street. This where on September 4, 1887, Sheriff Commodore Perry Owens confronted Andy Belvins, a member of the Hashknife Gang who was wanted for murder. The Holbrook Shoot-out resulted in the deaths of three members of the Belvins clan. It was in this historic landmark that Bruce Babbitt chose to be sworn in there as Arizona attorney general in 1975. Babbitt, who went on to be Arizona governor and U.S. Secretary of Interior, was asked back then if he identified with Sheriff Owens. Babbitt's dead pan response was: "I'm not a gunfighter."
- The Holbrook Cemetery was established in 1881. The Pioneers' Cemetery Association (PCA) defines a "historic cemetery" as one which has been in existence for more than fifty years.
- The Sidney Sapp House was built in 1911 and is located at 215 W. Hopi Dr. Sidney Sapp (1868–1938) was the Judge of the Superior Court of Navajo County. He was the founder of the "Holbrook News". Sapp collected enough funds to establish a church in 1913. This house of worship was originally called the Community Church. The Sapp house was listed in the National Register of Historic Places on March 13, 1986, ref.: #86000362.
- The Community Church a.k.a. the United Methodist Church. The structure was built in 1912 and is located at 118 W Arizona Street. Mrs. Alma Sapp protested that she would not live in a town without a church and therefore her husband Judge Sidney Sapp organized the establishment of the church.
- The Holbrook Bridge which is over the Little Colorado River. The bridge was built in 1916 and was listed in the National Register of Historic Places on September 30, 1988, ref.: #88001686.
- The Historic U.S. Route 66 was originally opened in 1926 and parts of it ran through the town of Holbrook. Route 66 is listed in the National Register of Historic Places.
- The Wigwam Village No. 6 (Wigwam Motel) was built between the 1930s and 1940s. The Wigwam is located at 811 West Hopi Drive. It was listed in the National Register of Historic Places on May 2, 2002, ref.: #02000419.
- The Petrified Forest National Park is located 28 miles (45 km) east of Holbrook. The Petrified Forest is an American national park in Navajo and Apache counties.
- The Agate House Pueblo is located in the Petrified Forest National Forest. The Agate House is a partially reconstructed Puebloan building in Petrified Forest National Park, built almost entirely of petrified wood. The eight-room pueblo has been dated to approximately the year 900 and occupied through 1200. It was listed in the National Register of Historic Places in 1975, ref.: #75000170.
Historic Hobrook, Arizona

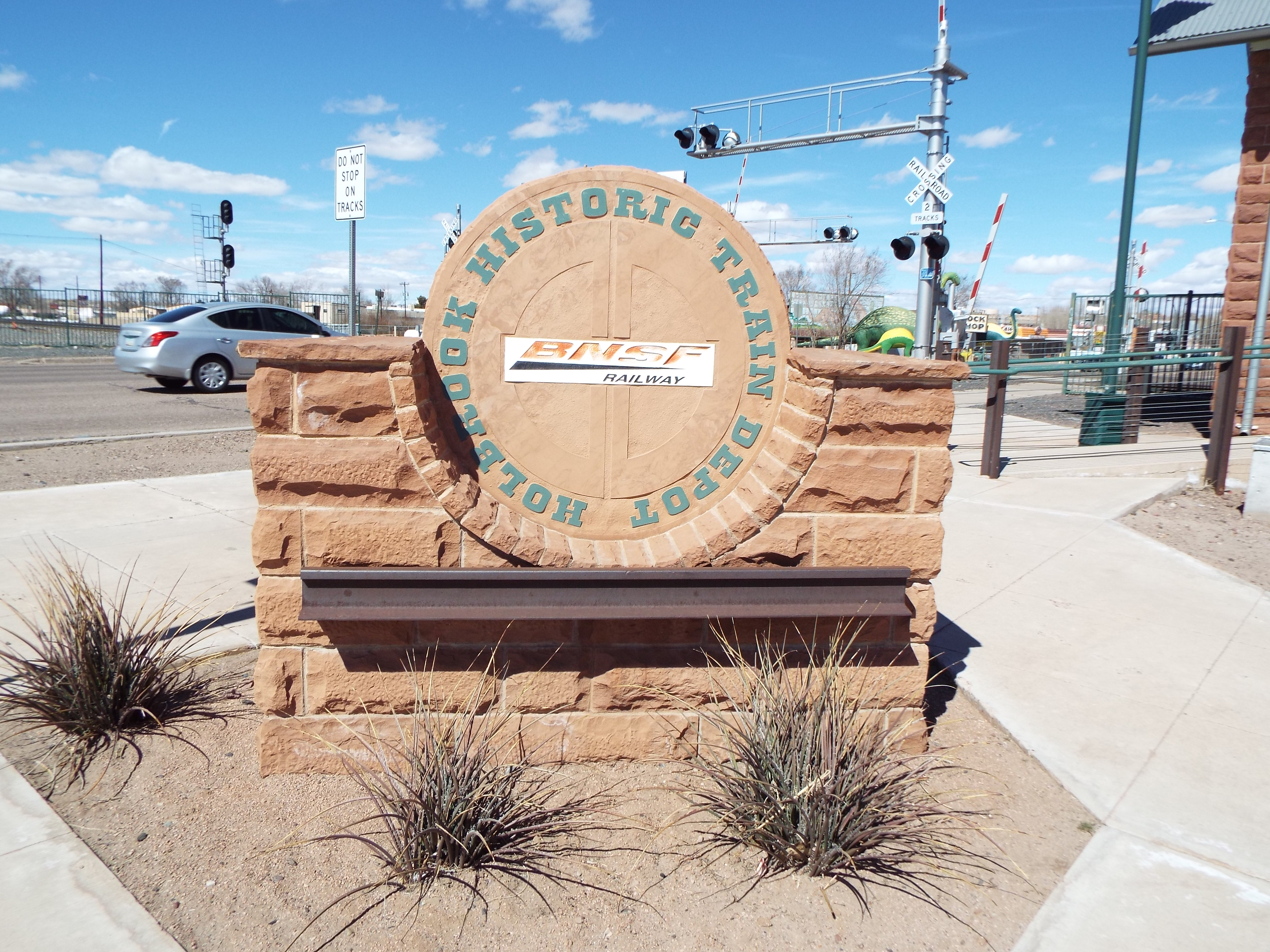
Historic Holbrook Station Marker

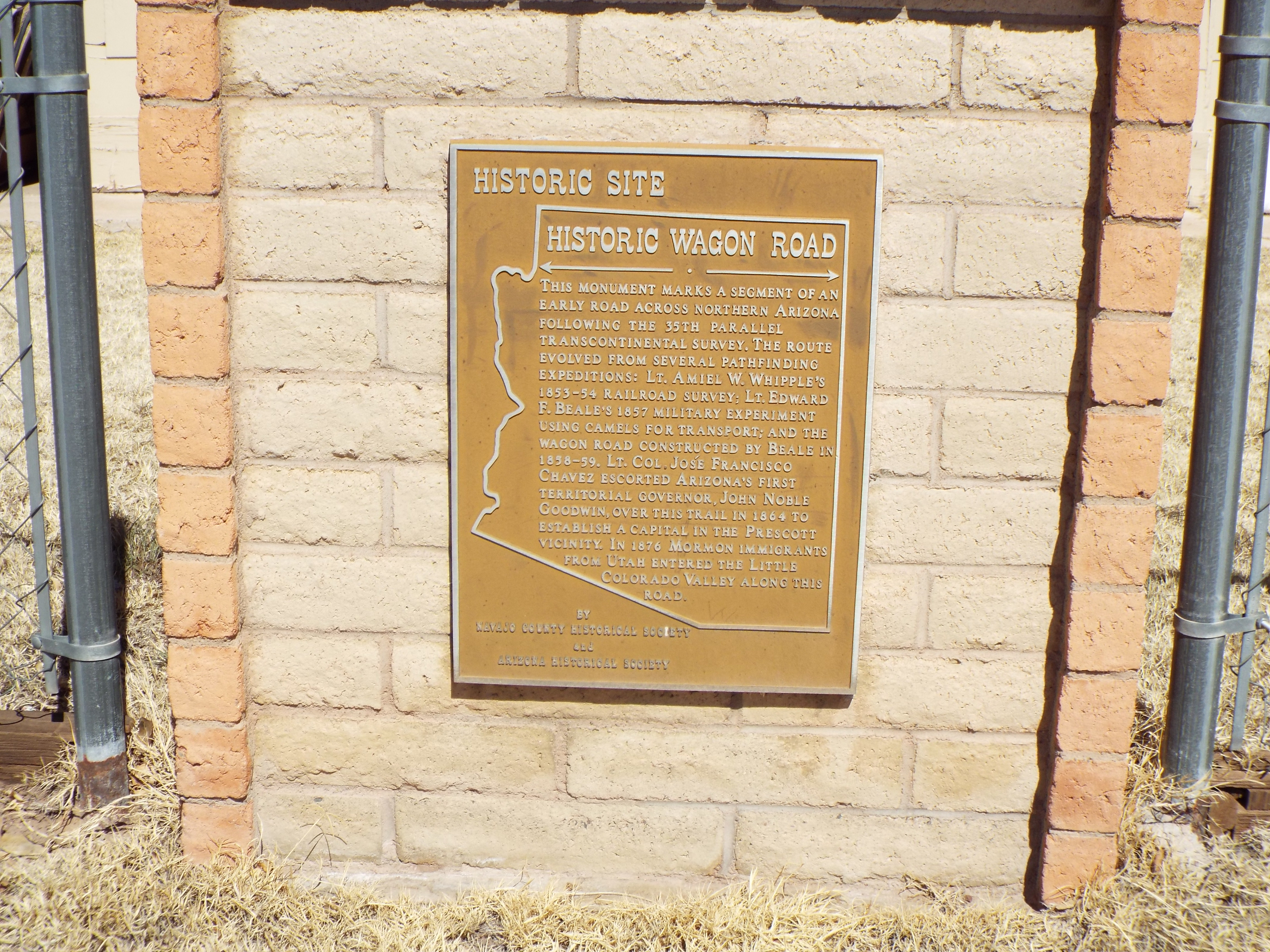
Historic Wagon Road marker

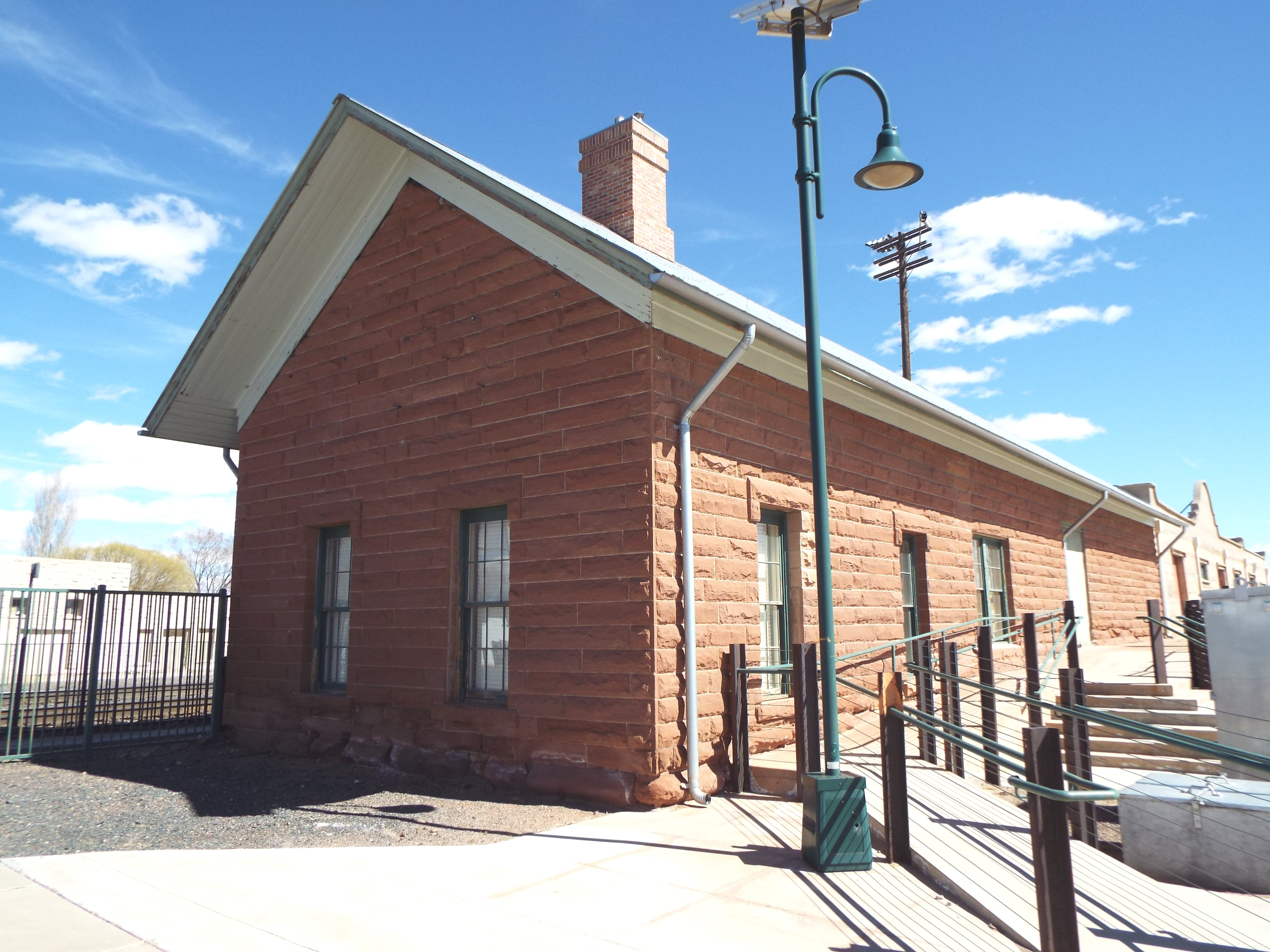
Atlantic and Pacific Railroad Depot

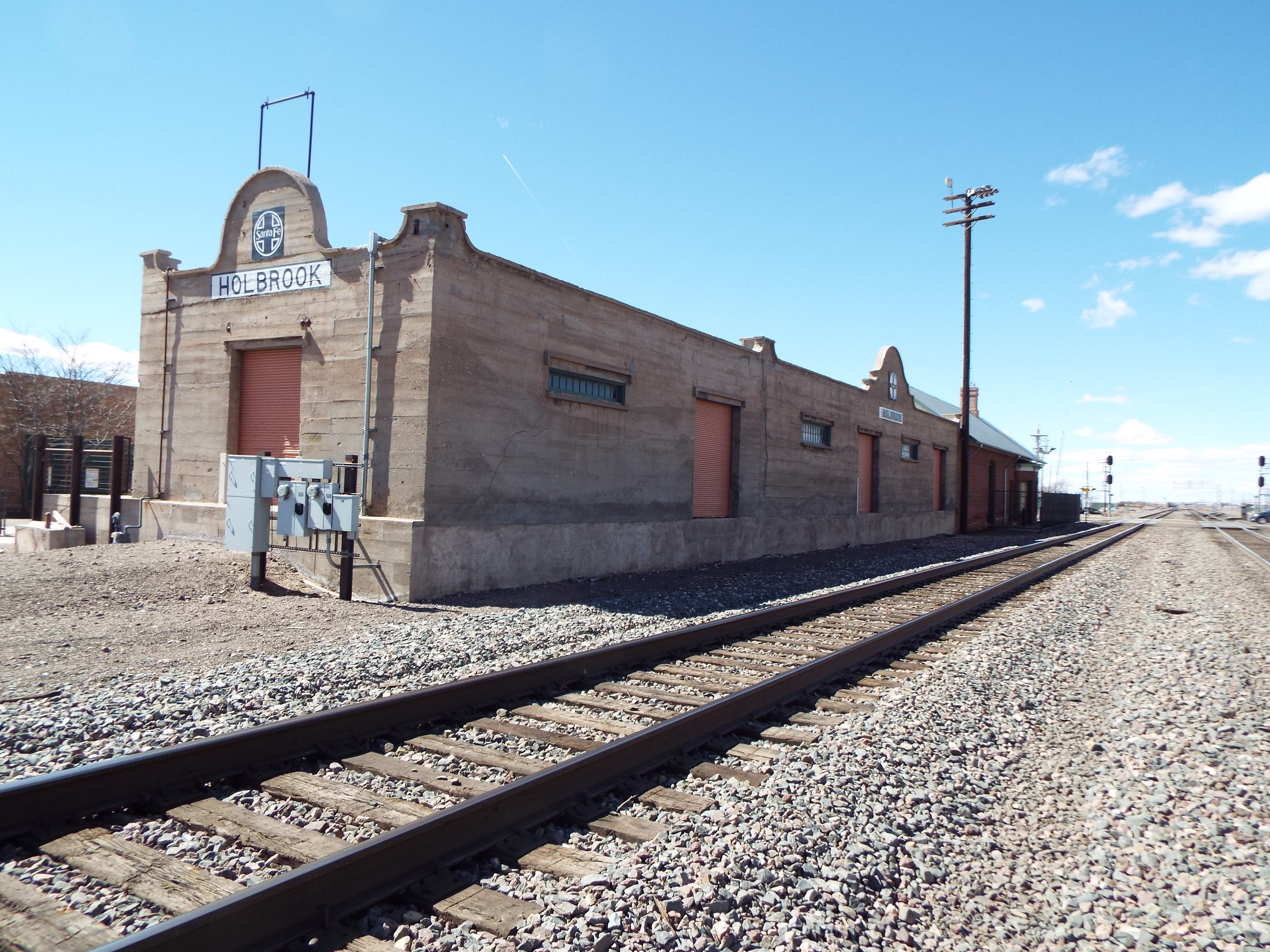
Santa Fe Railroad Depot

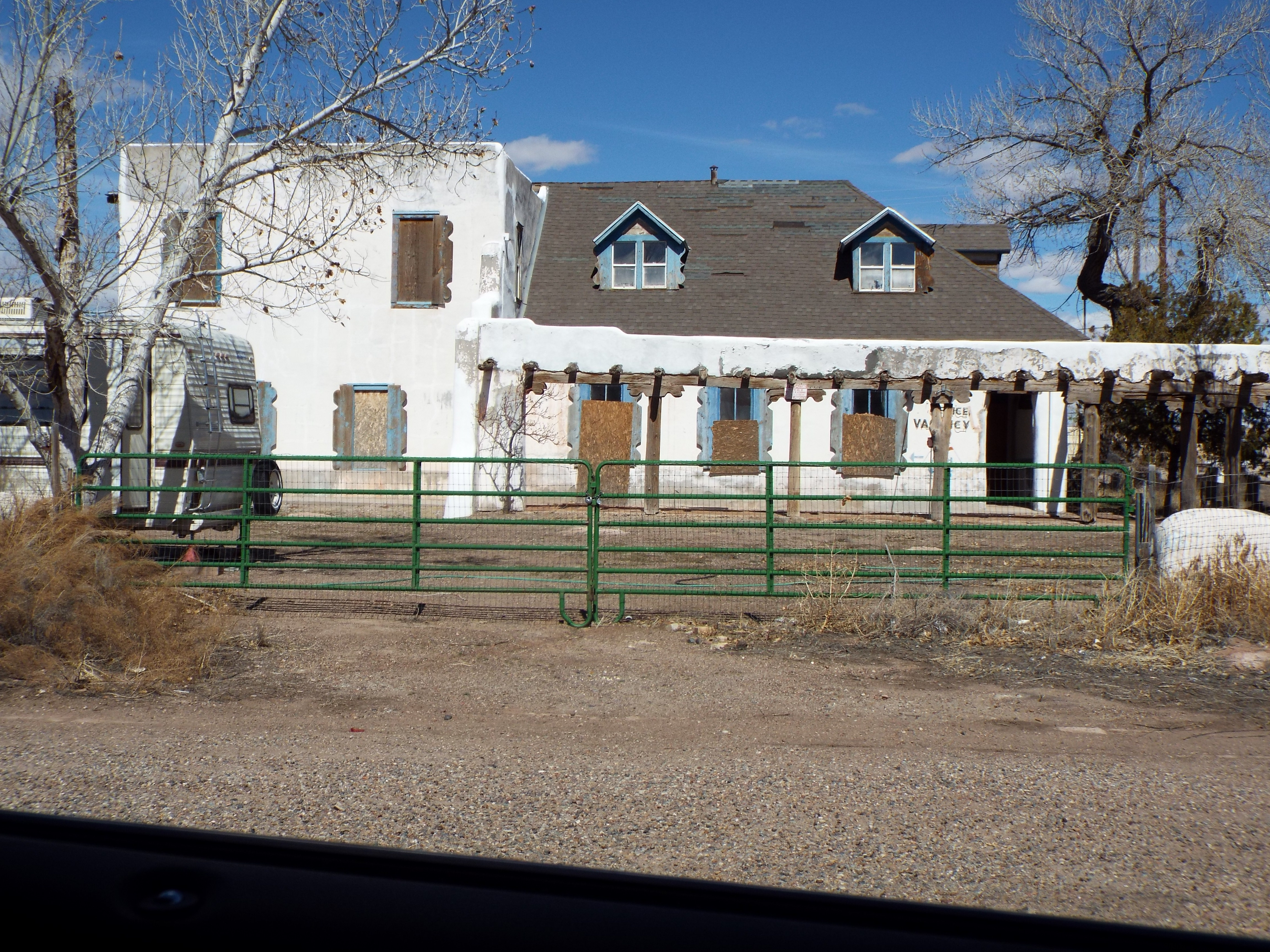
The Arizona Rancho Inn

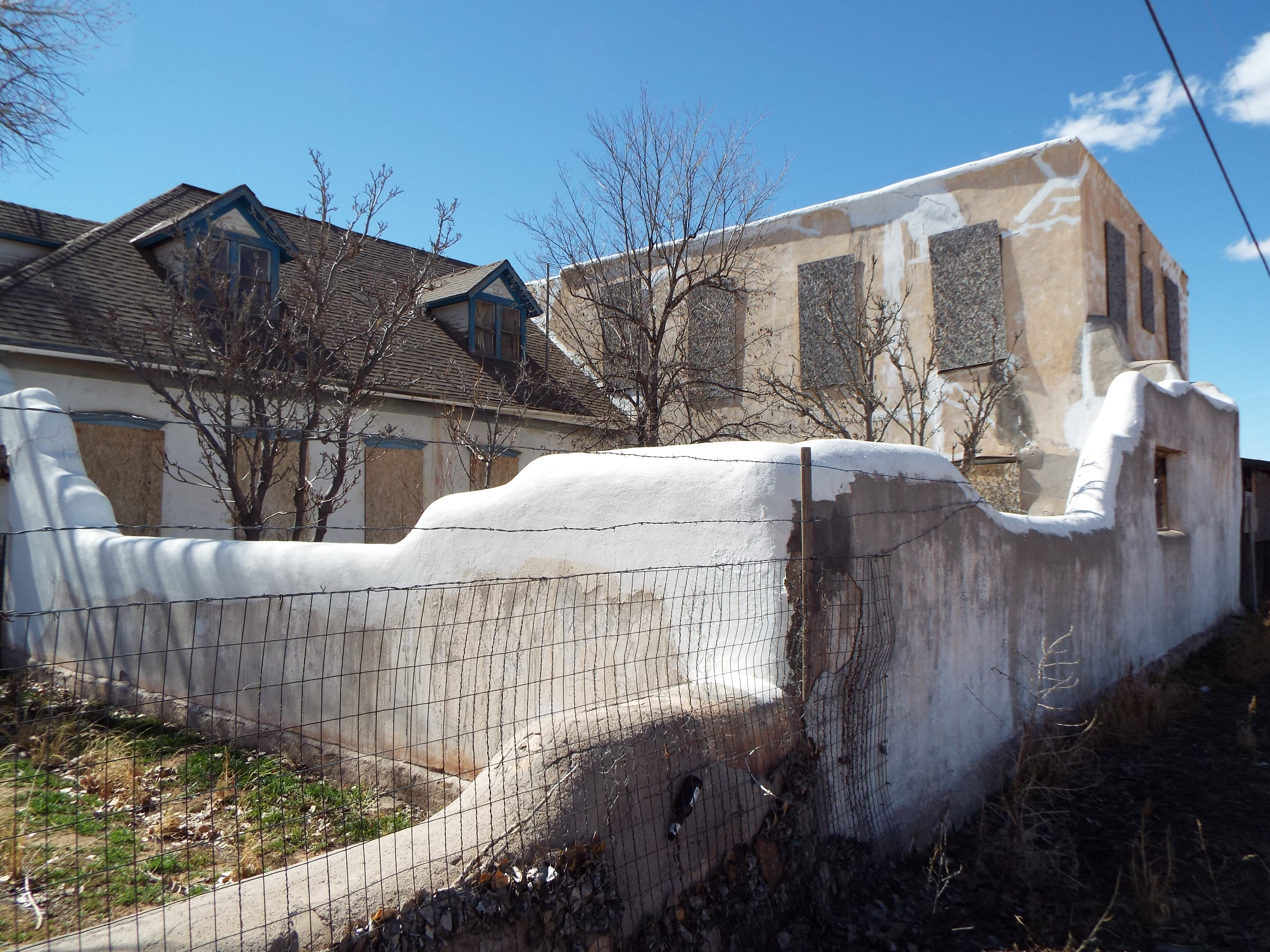
Different view of the Arizona Rancho Inn

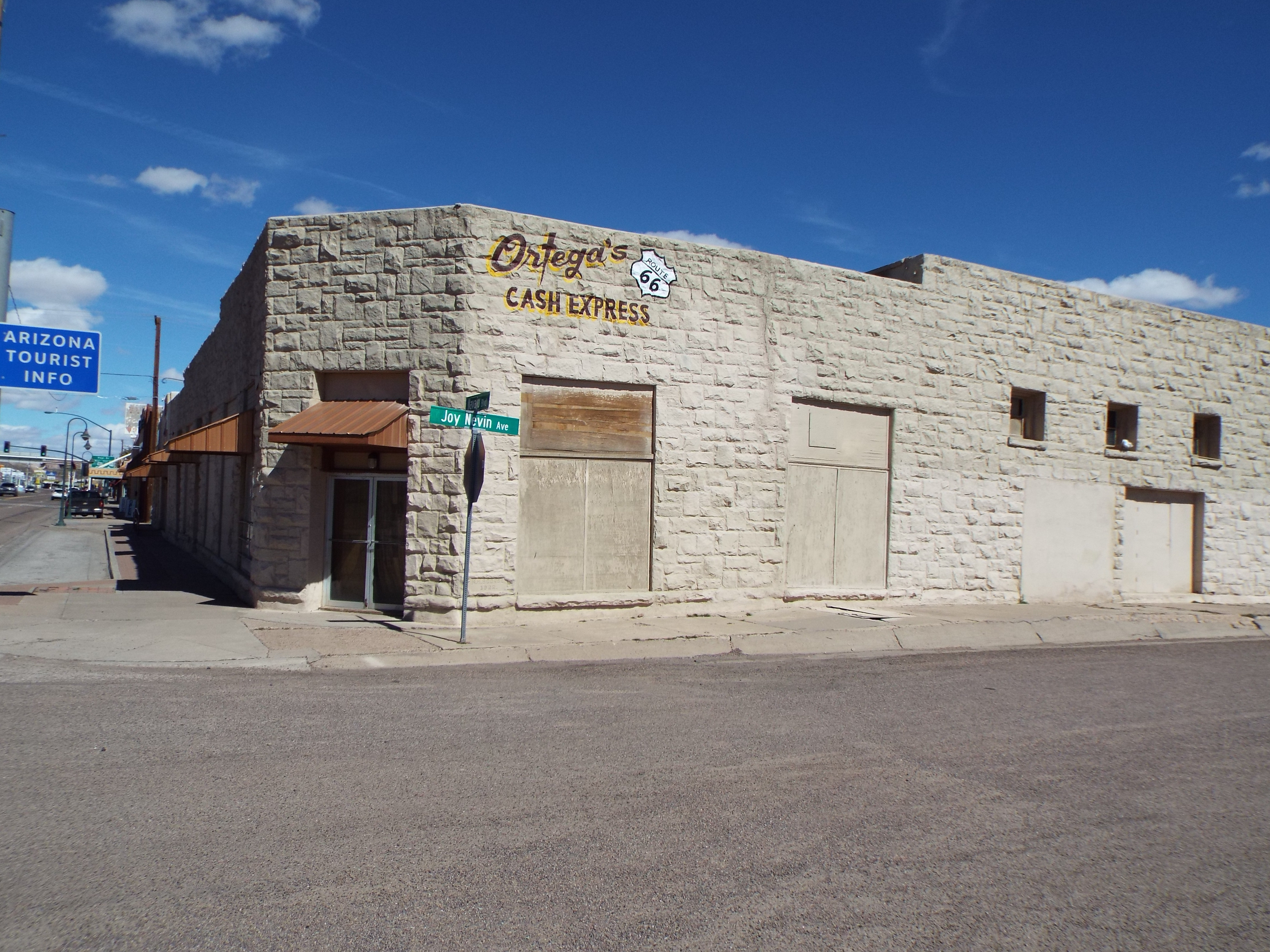
A & B Schuster Mercantile Company

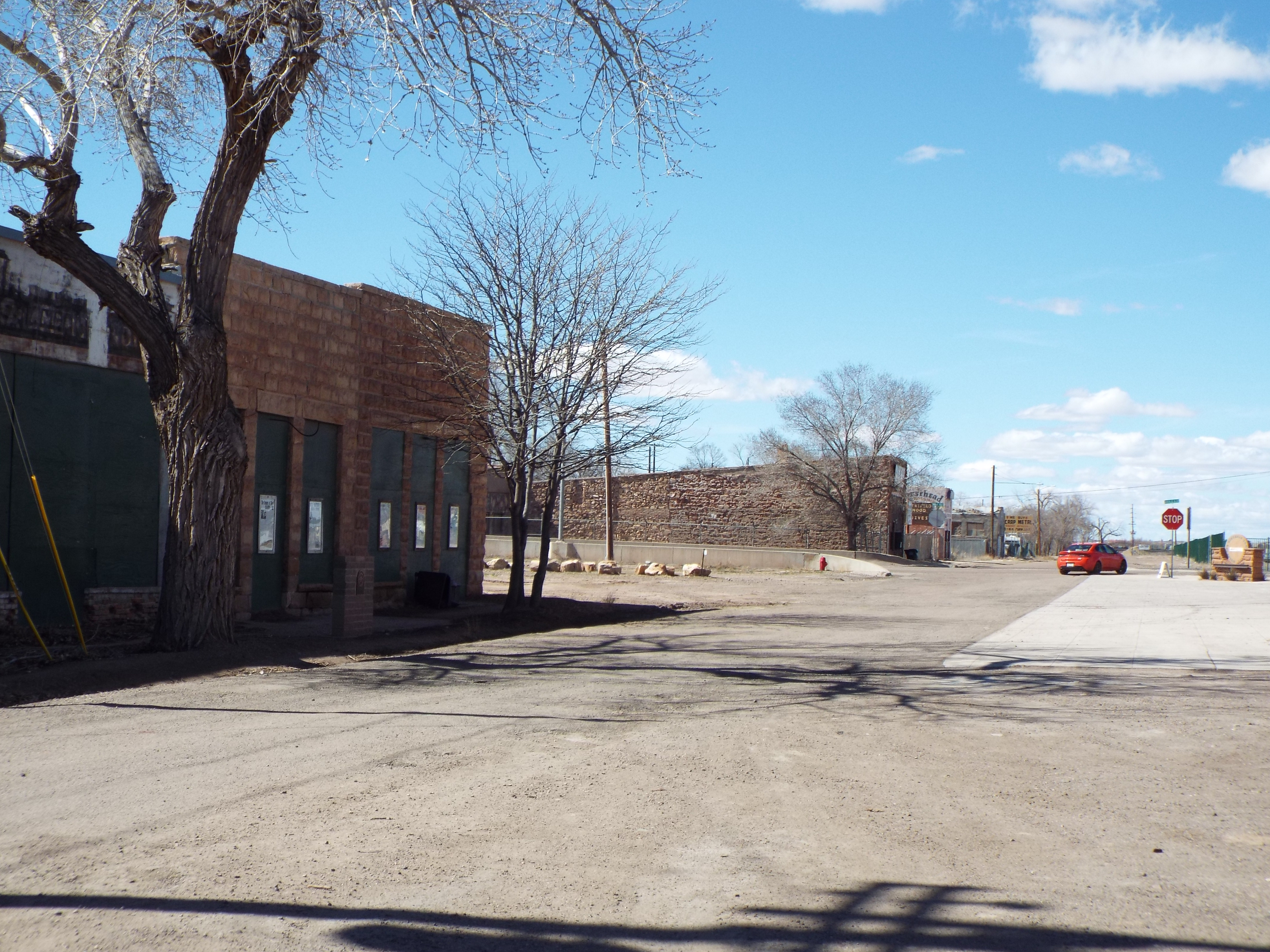
South Central Avenue Commercial Historic District

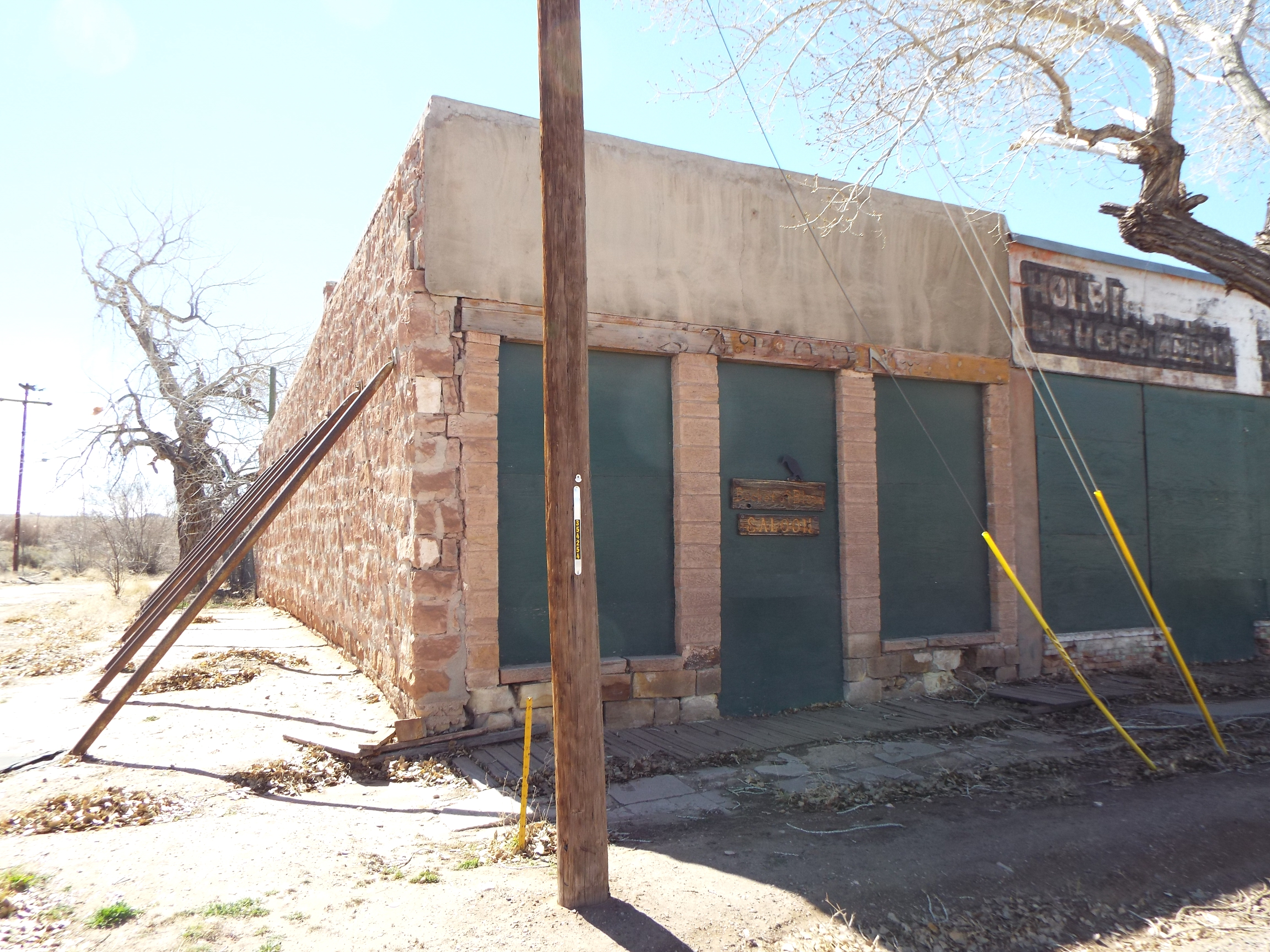
Bucket of Blood Saloon

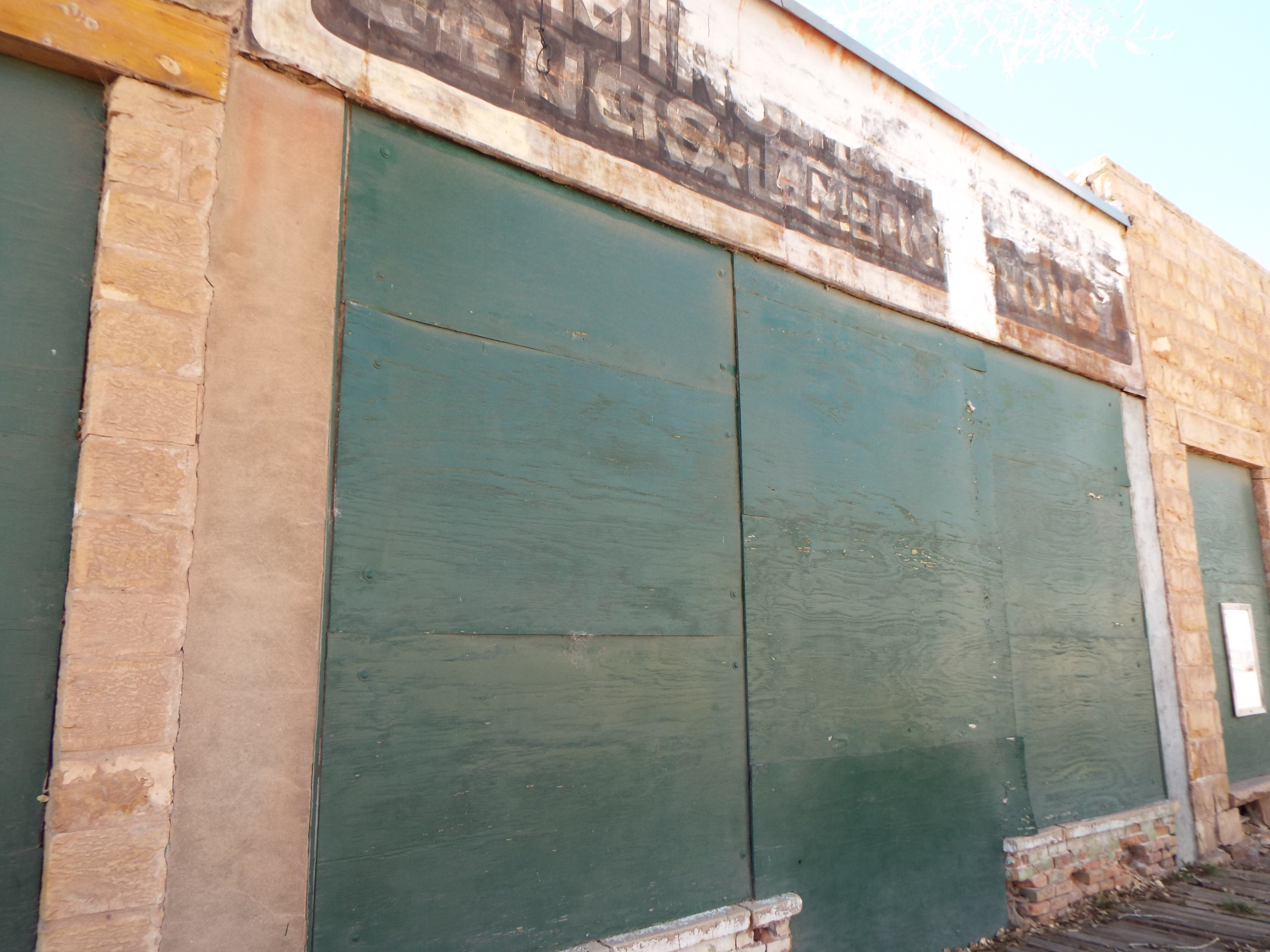
Robinson & Co. Drug Store

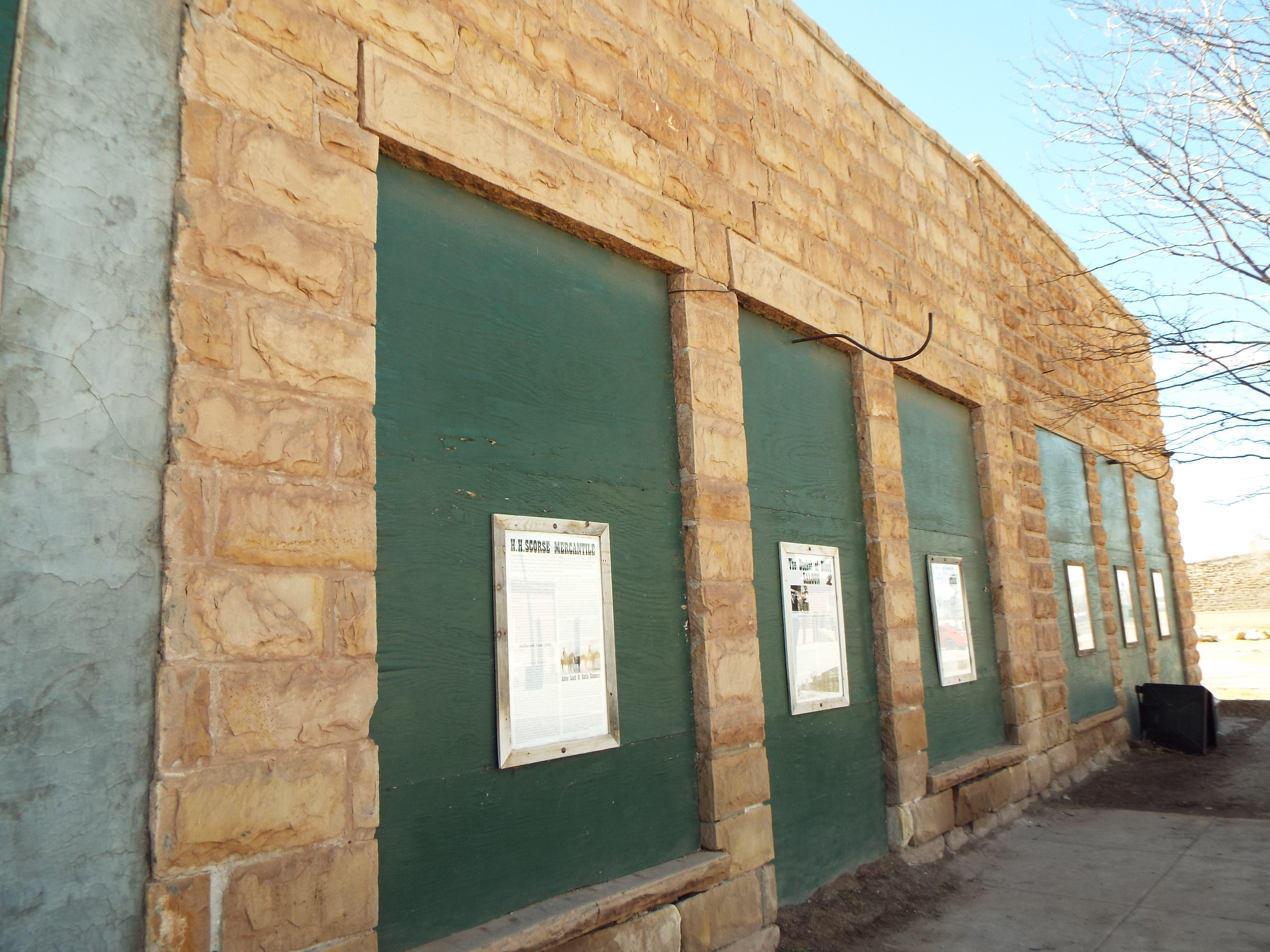
The Scorse Mercantile and the Pioneer Saloon

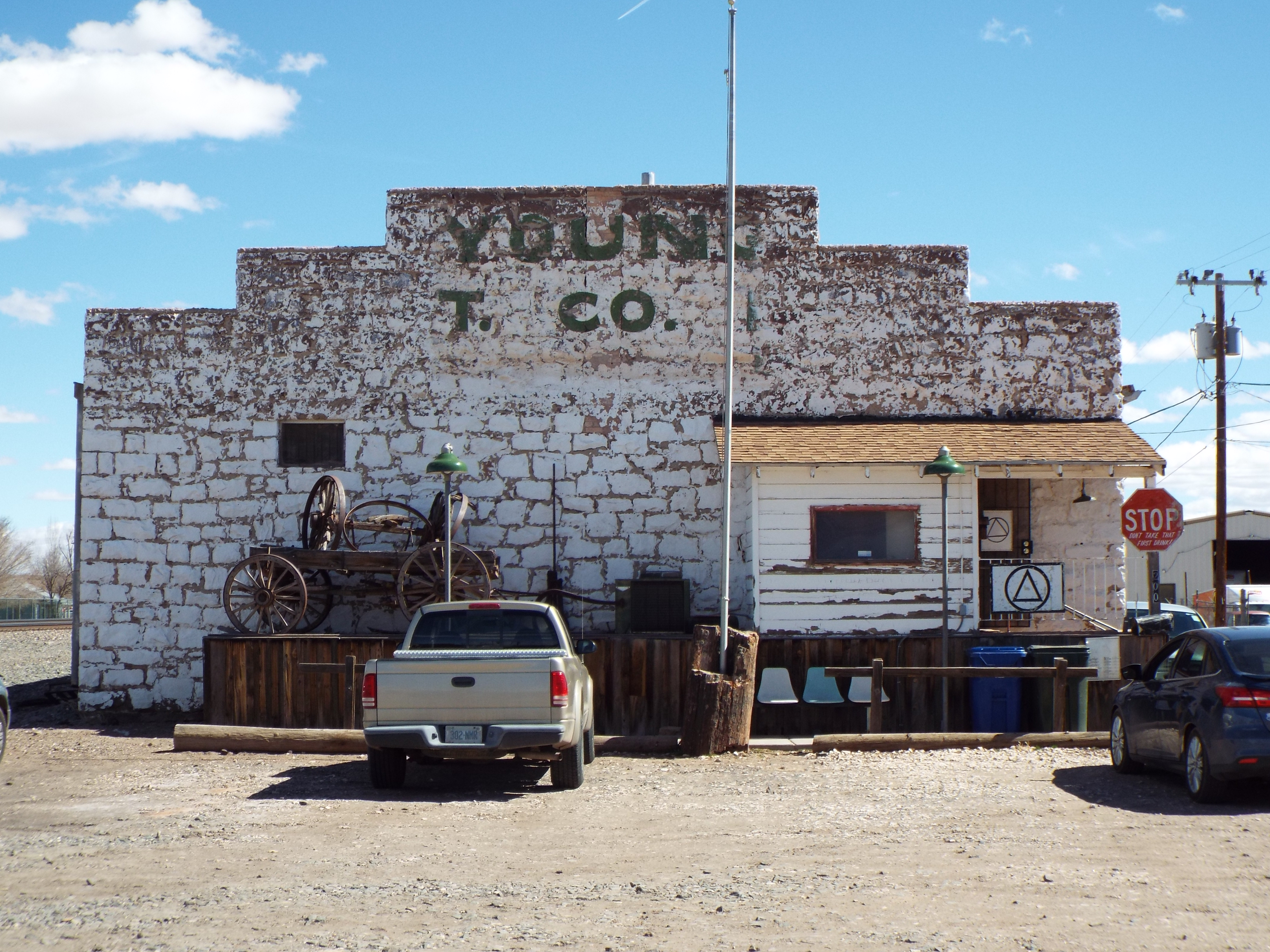
The Young T Company Warehouse

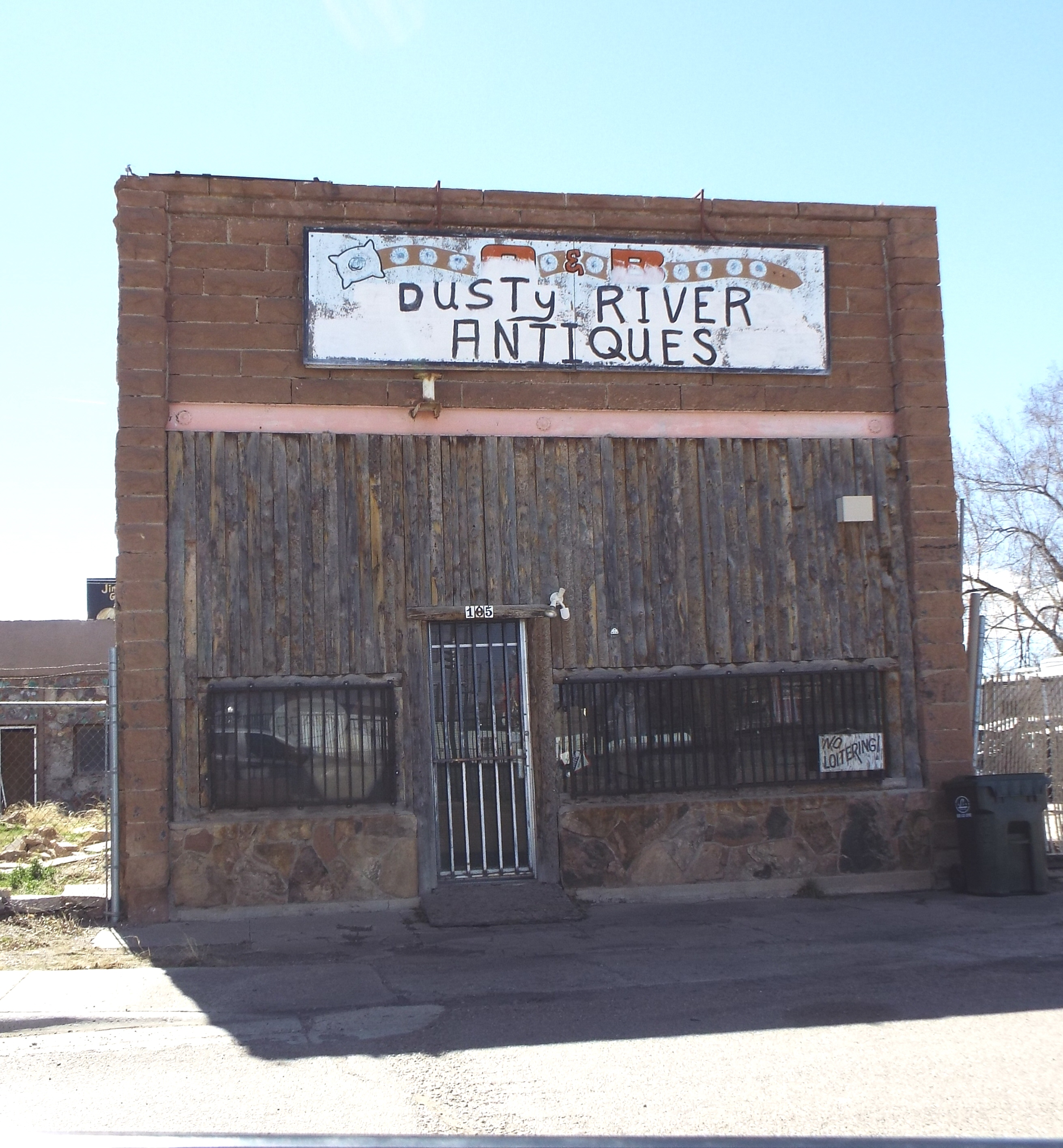
The Dusty River Grocery Store

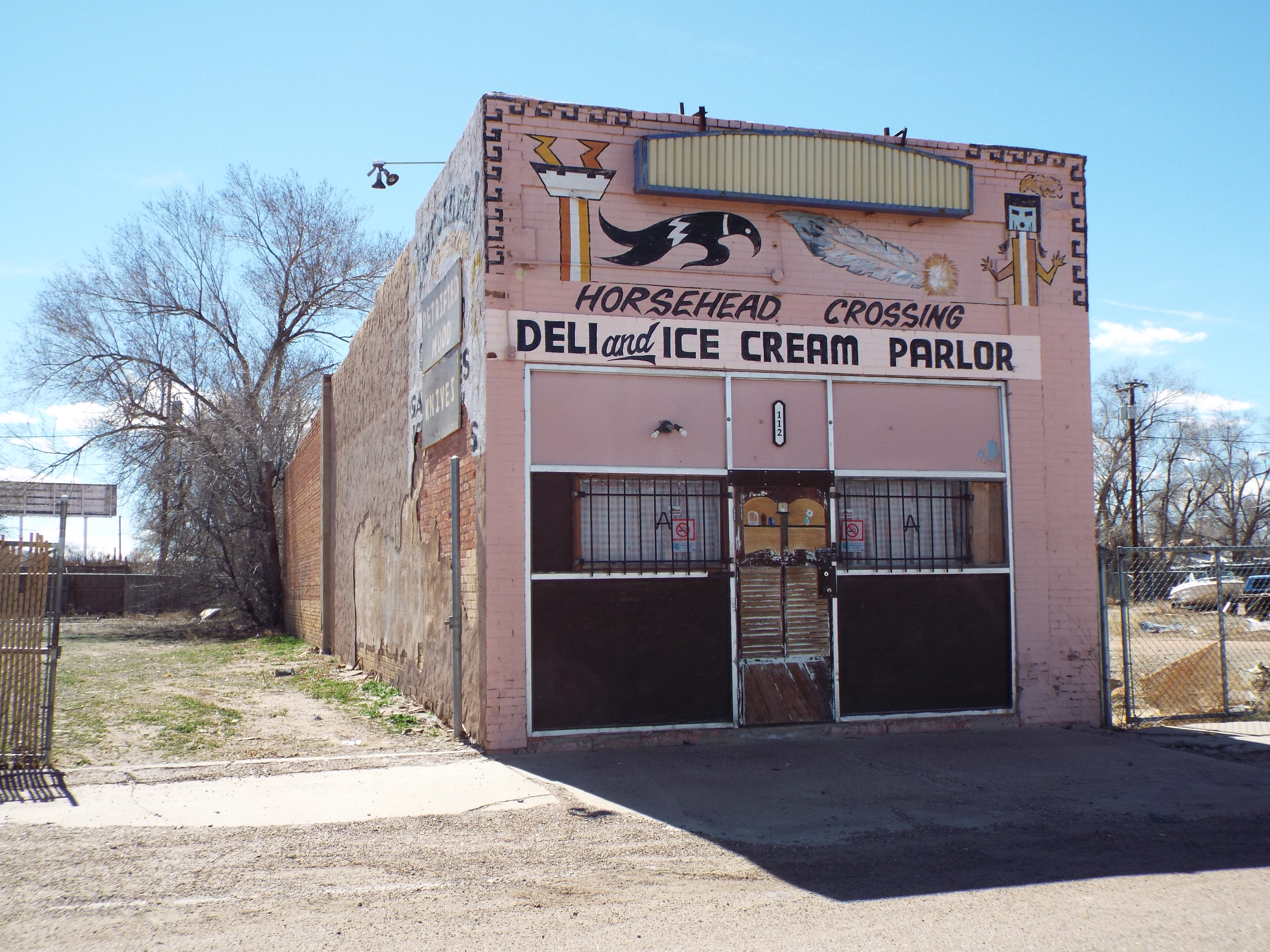
The Horsehead Crossing Deli and Ice Cream Parlor

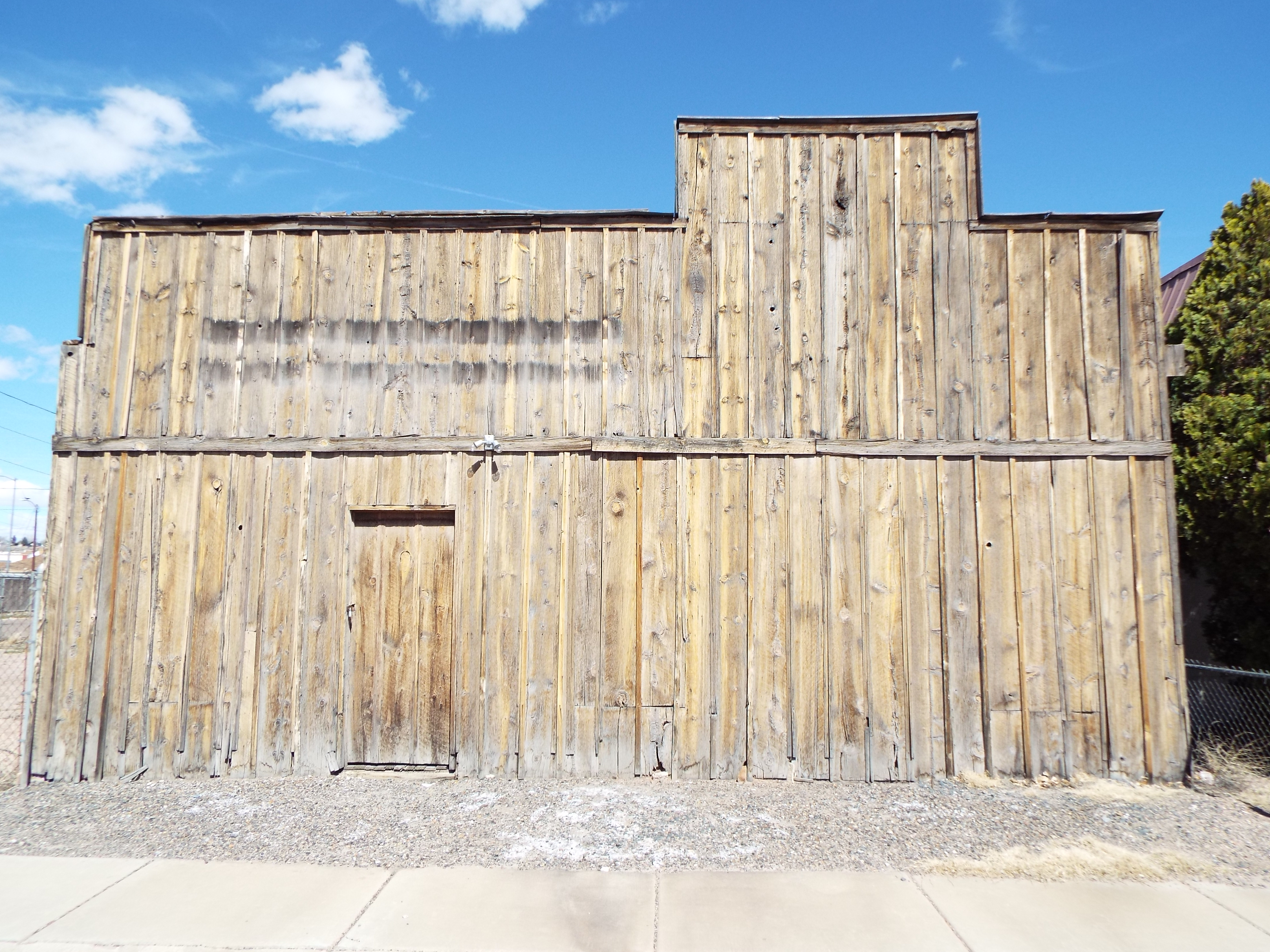
The Navajo County Sheriff office

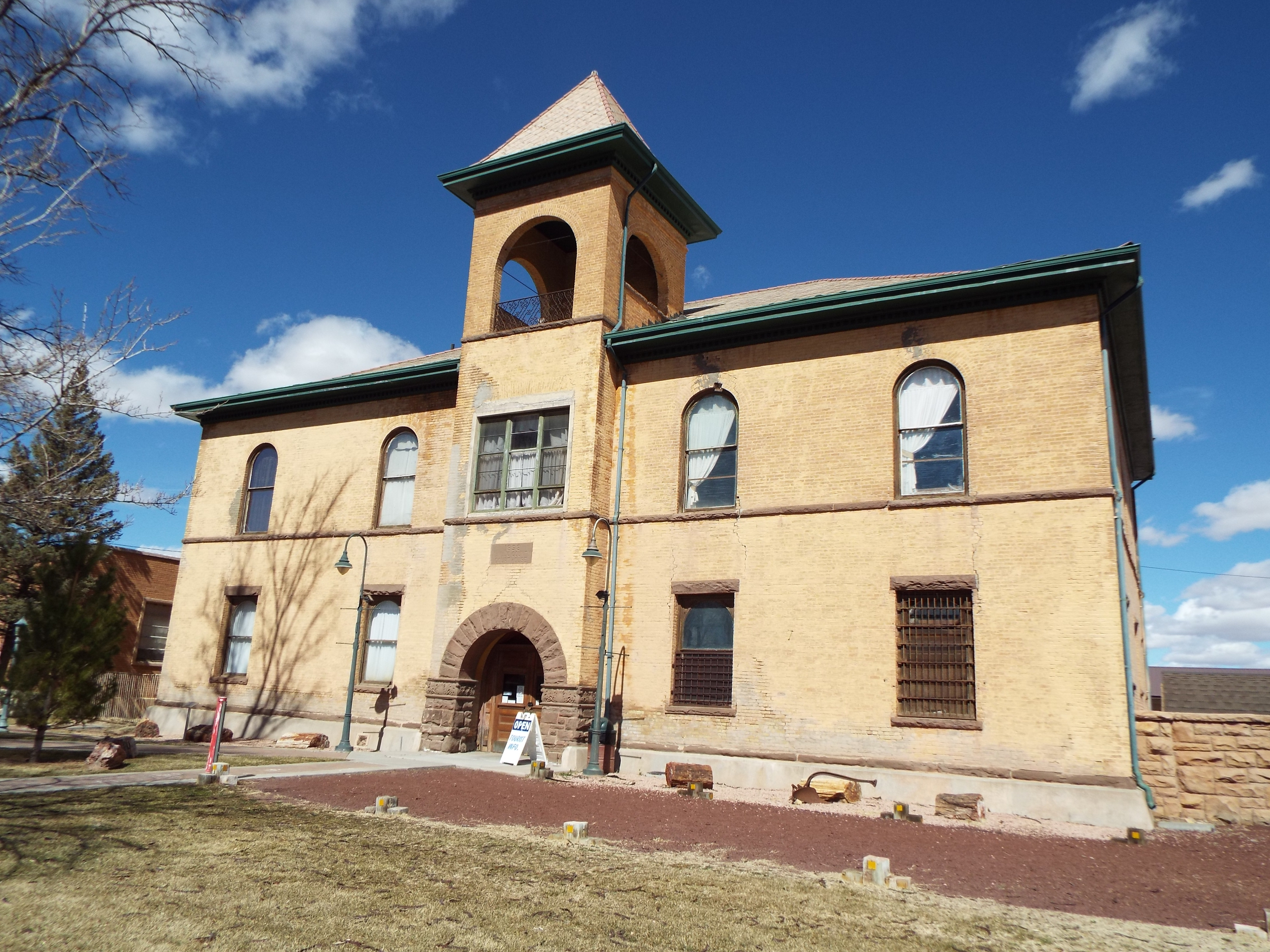
The Navajo County Courthouse

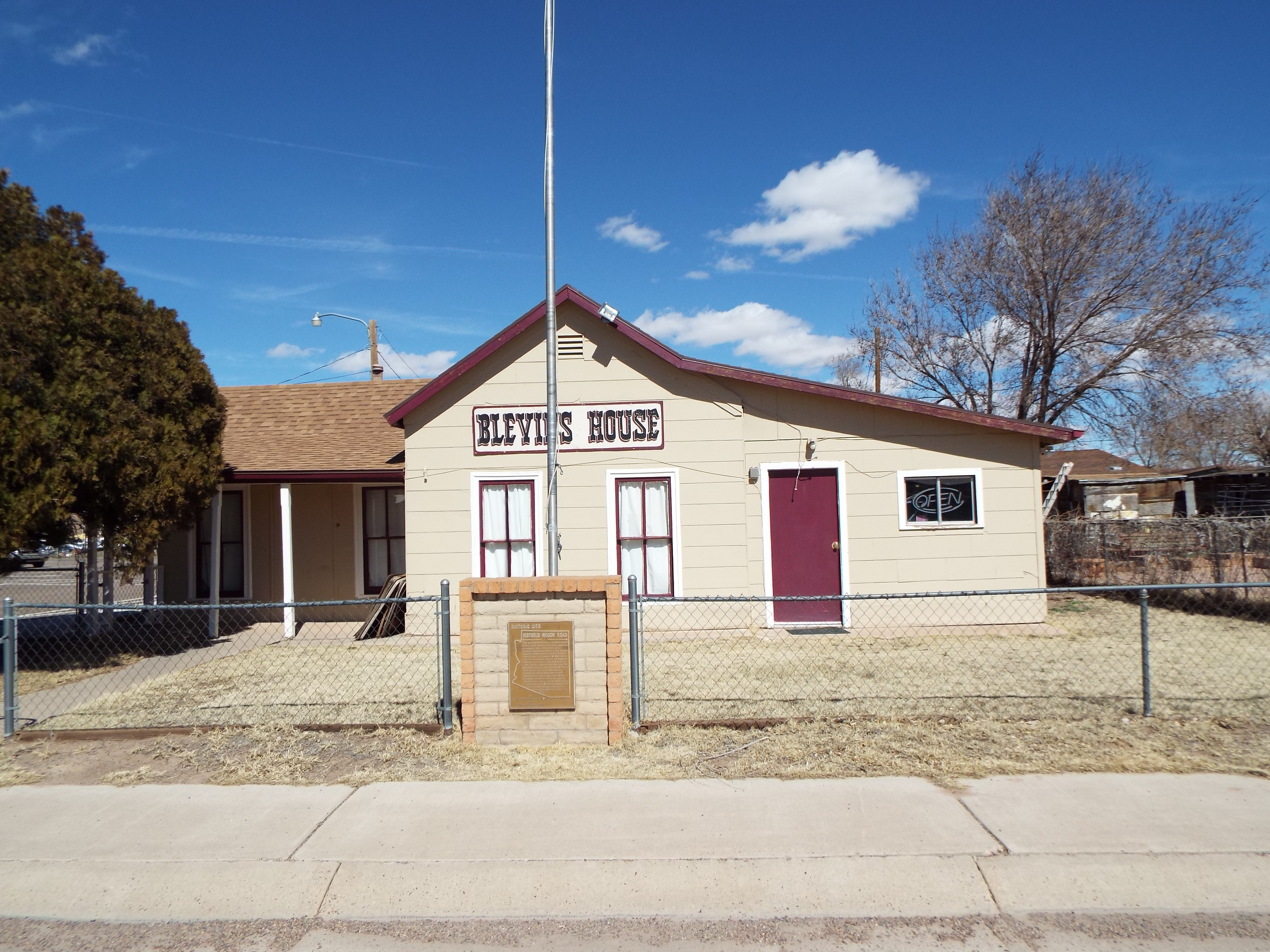
The Blevins House

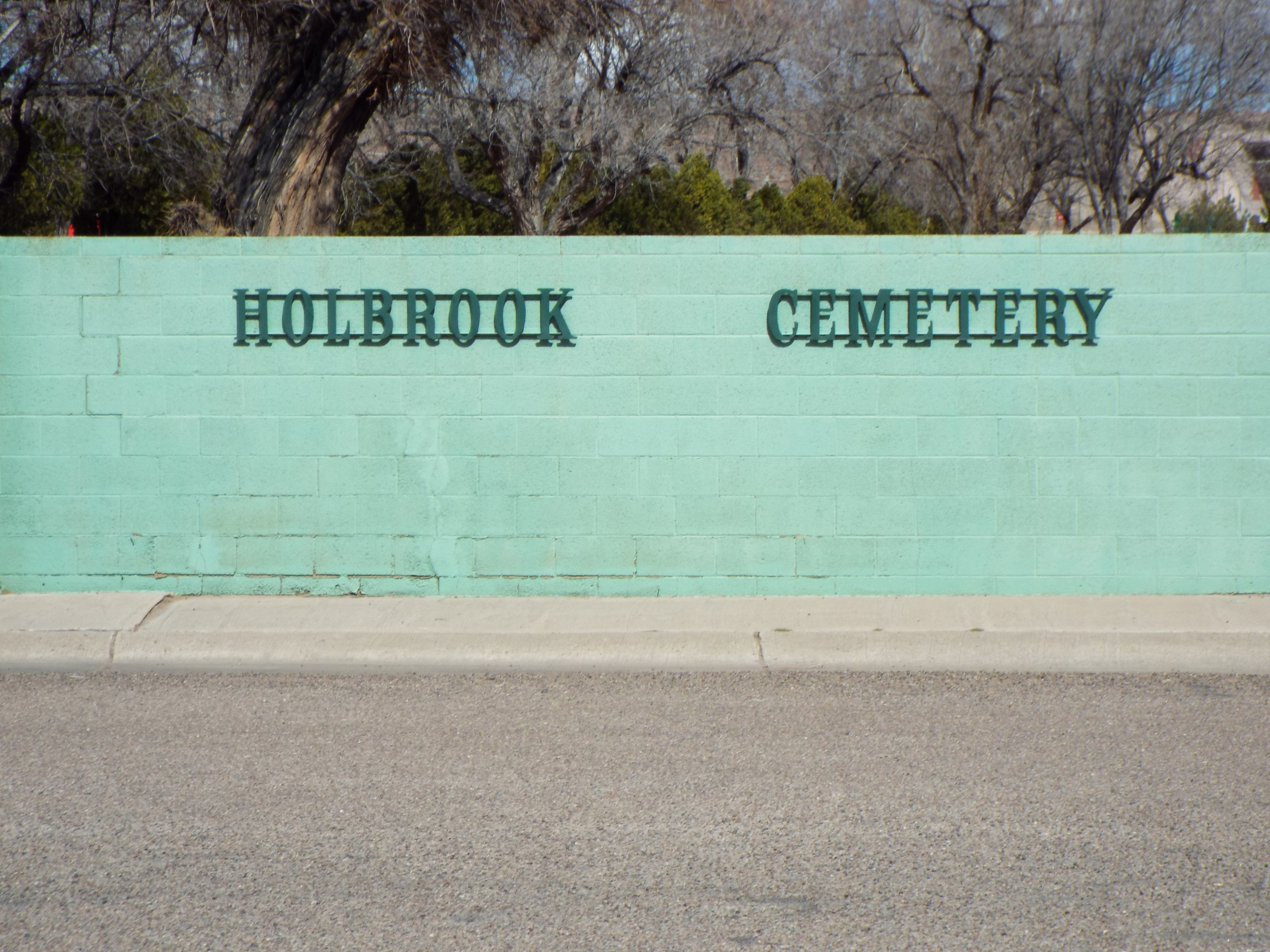
The Holbrook Cemetery

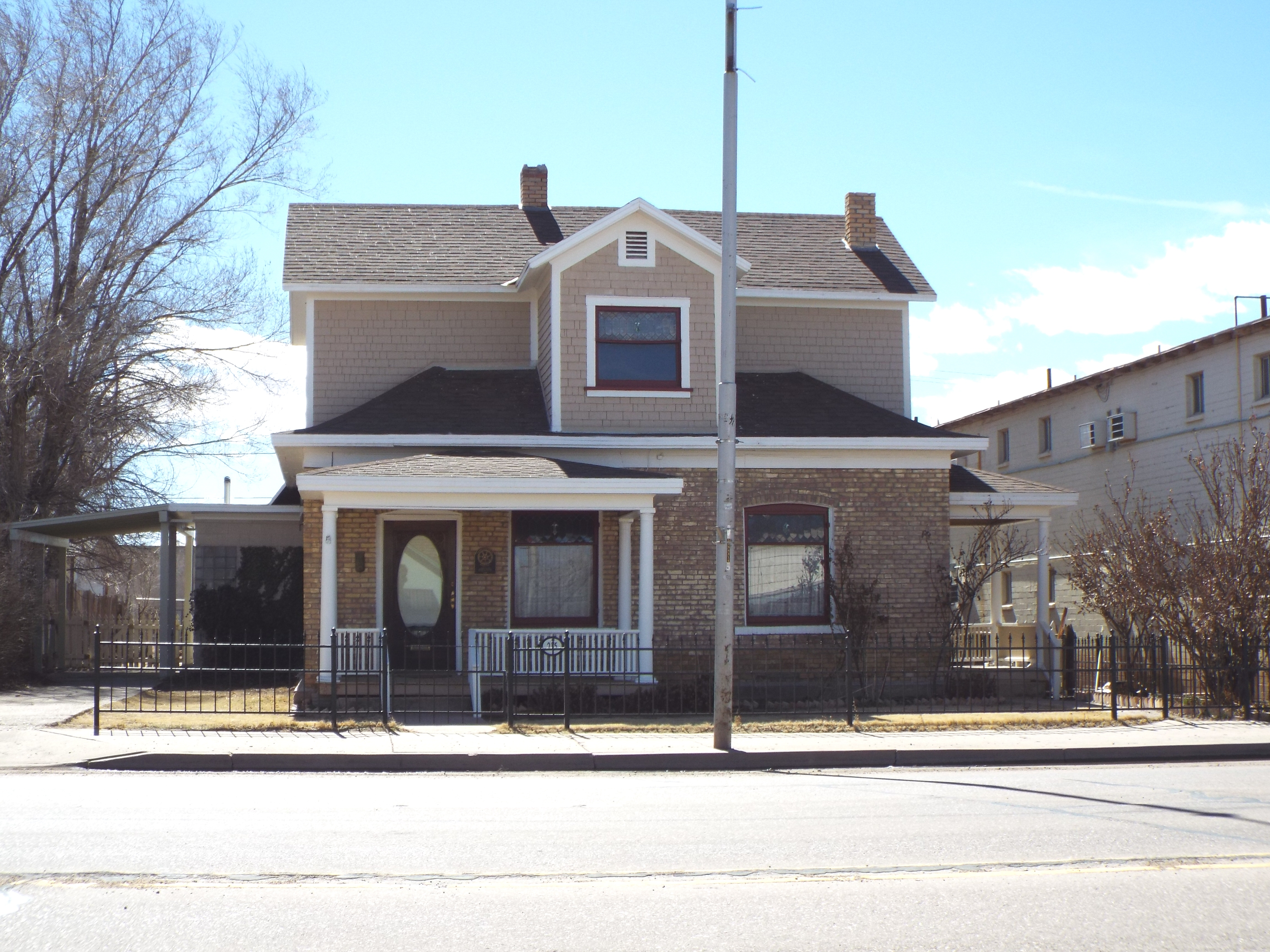
The Sidney Sapp House

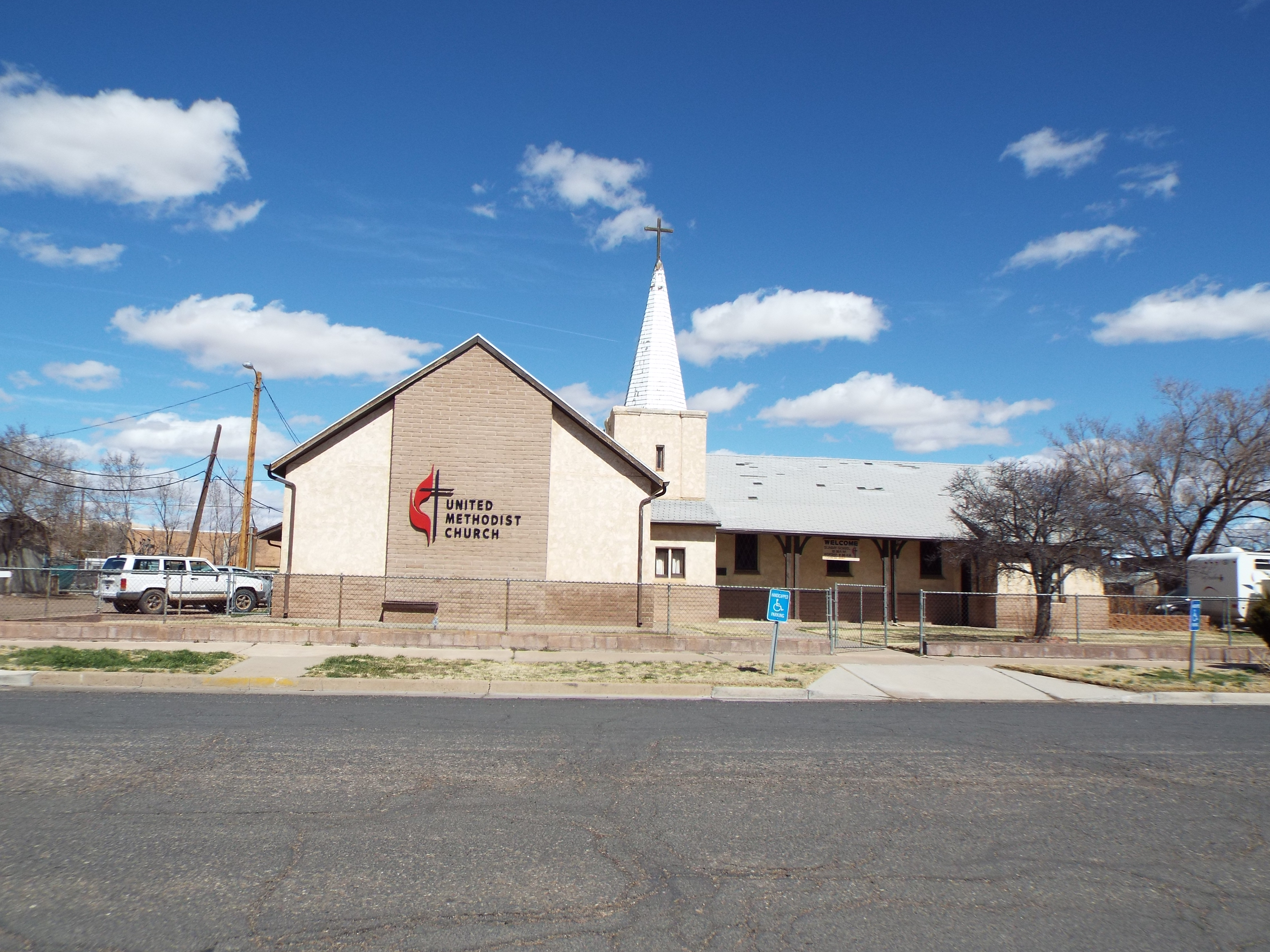
The Community Church a.k.a. the United Methodist Church

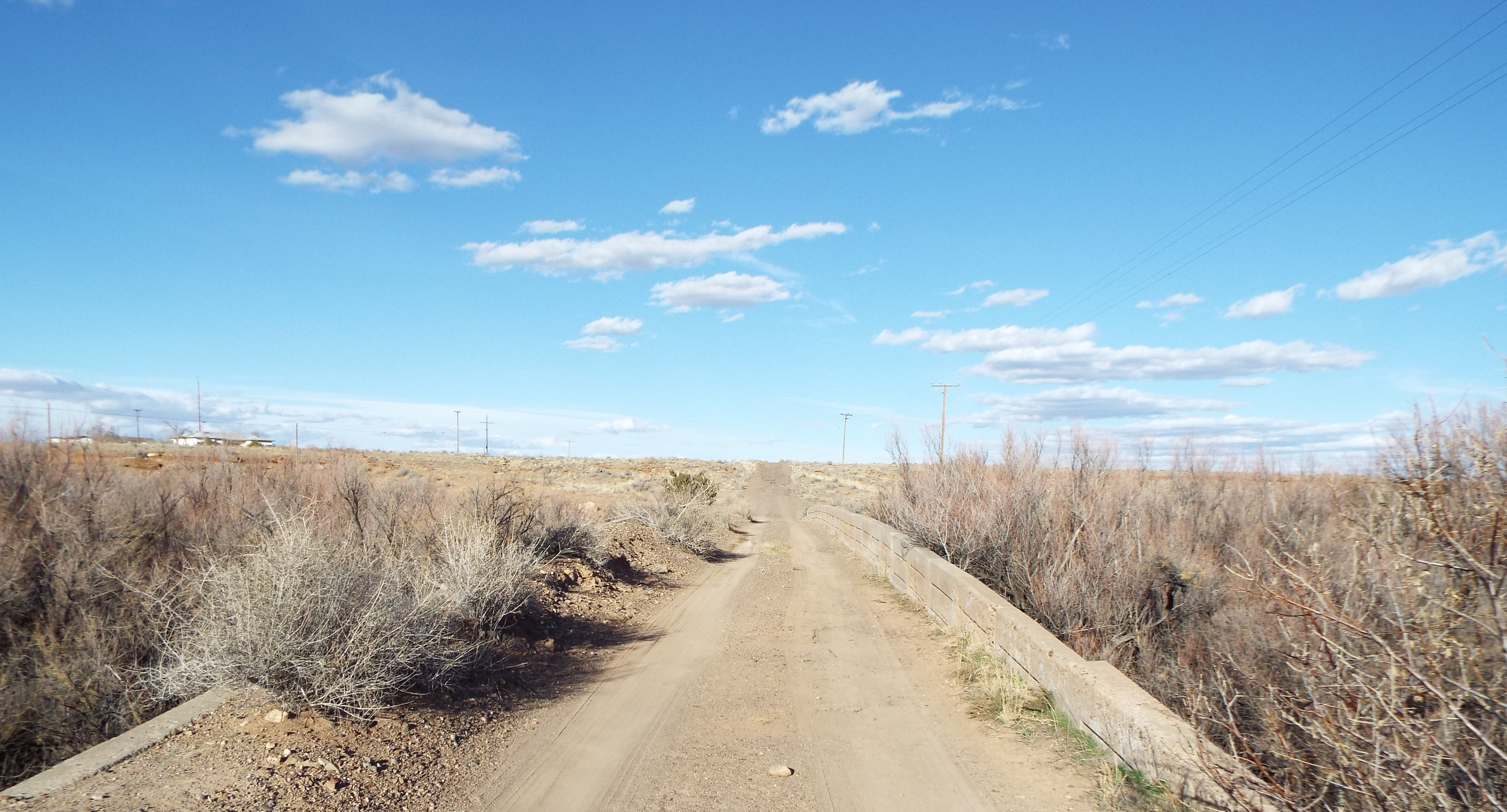
The Holbrook Bridge

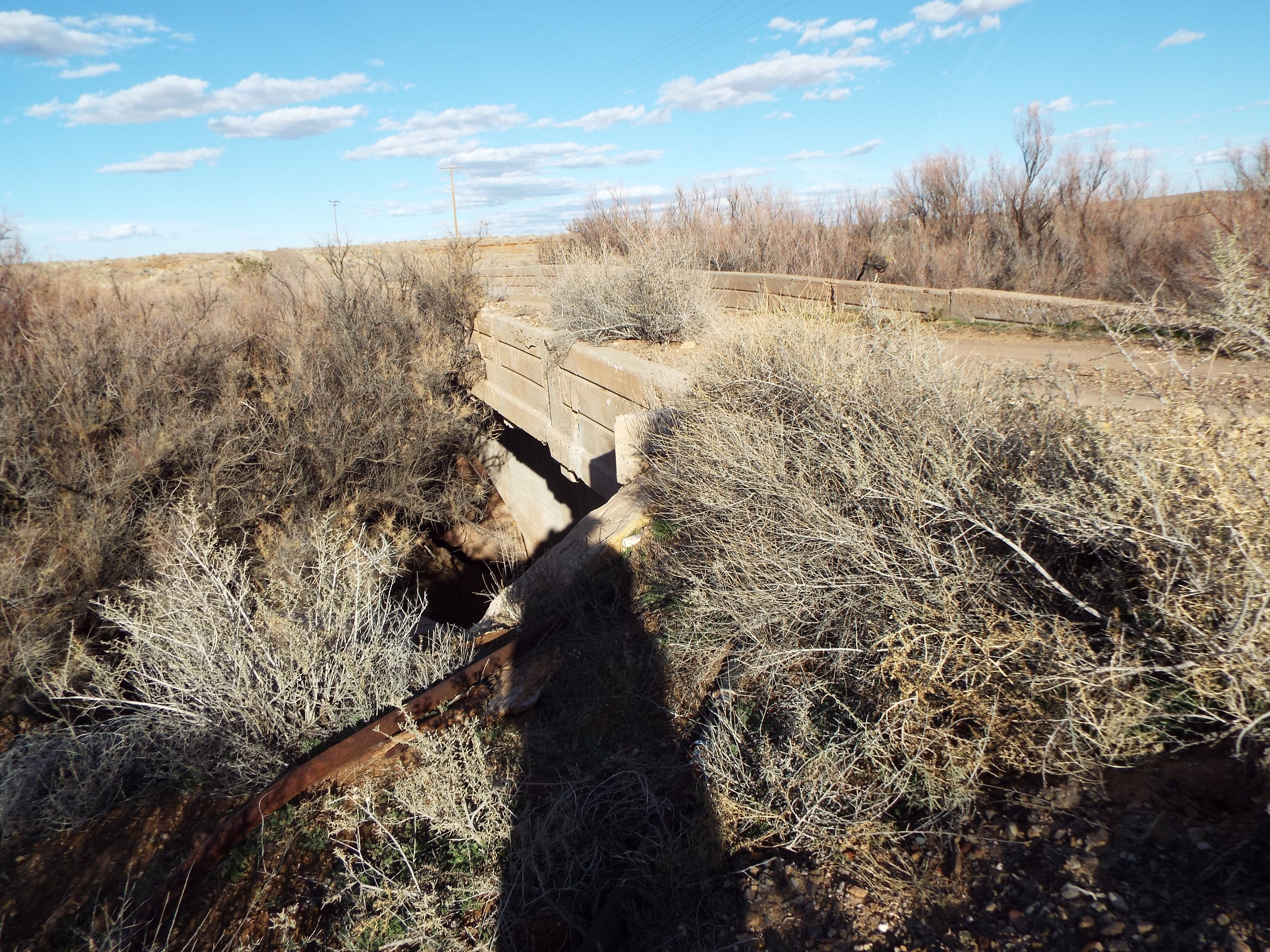
The Holbrook Bridge

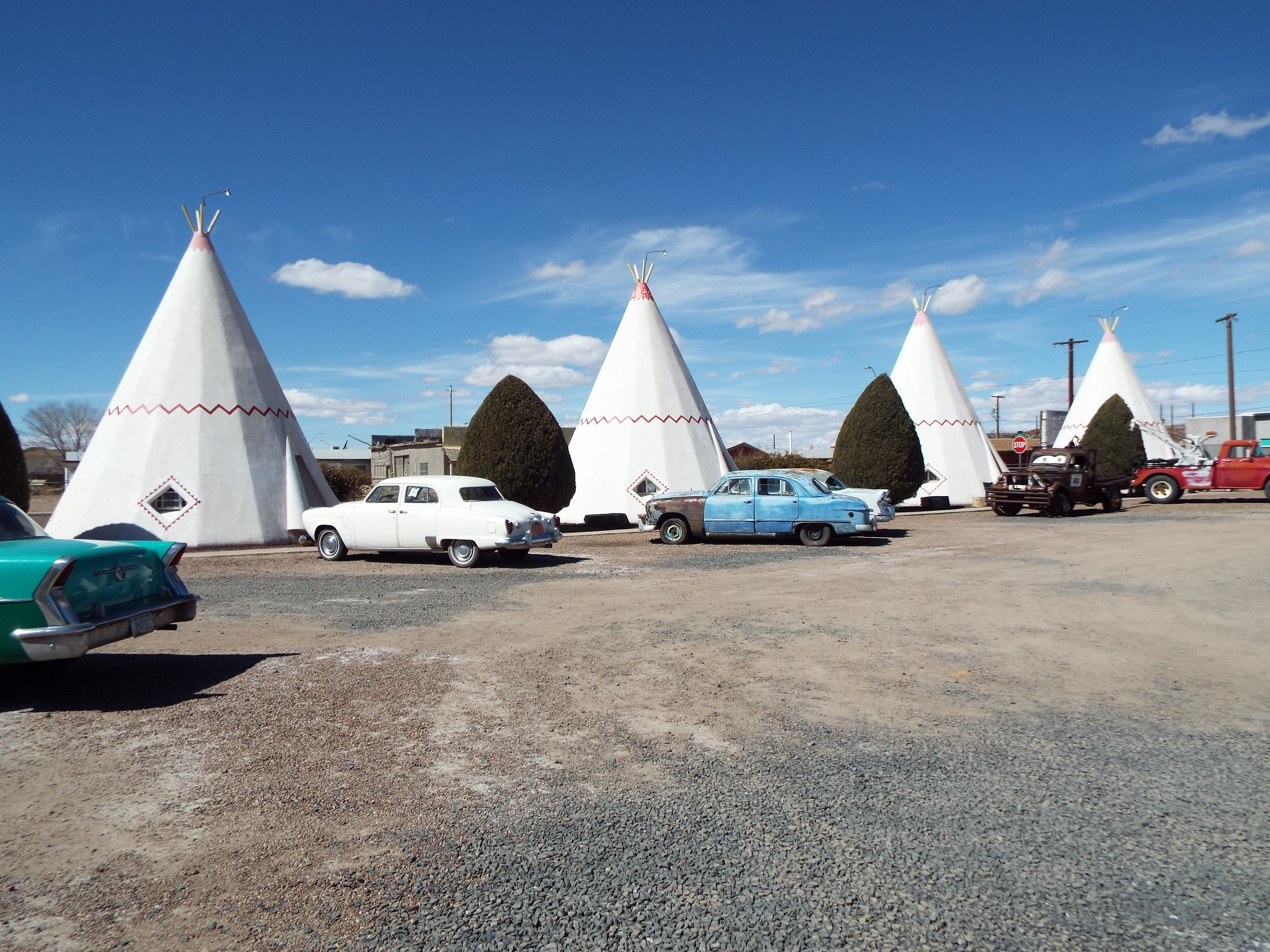
The Wigwam Motel

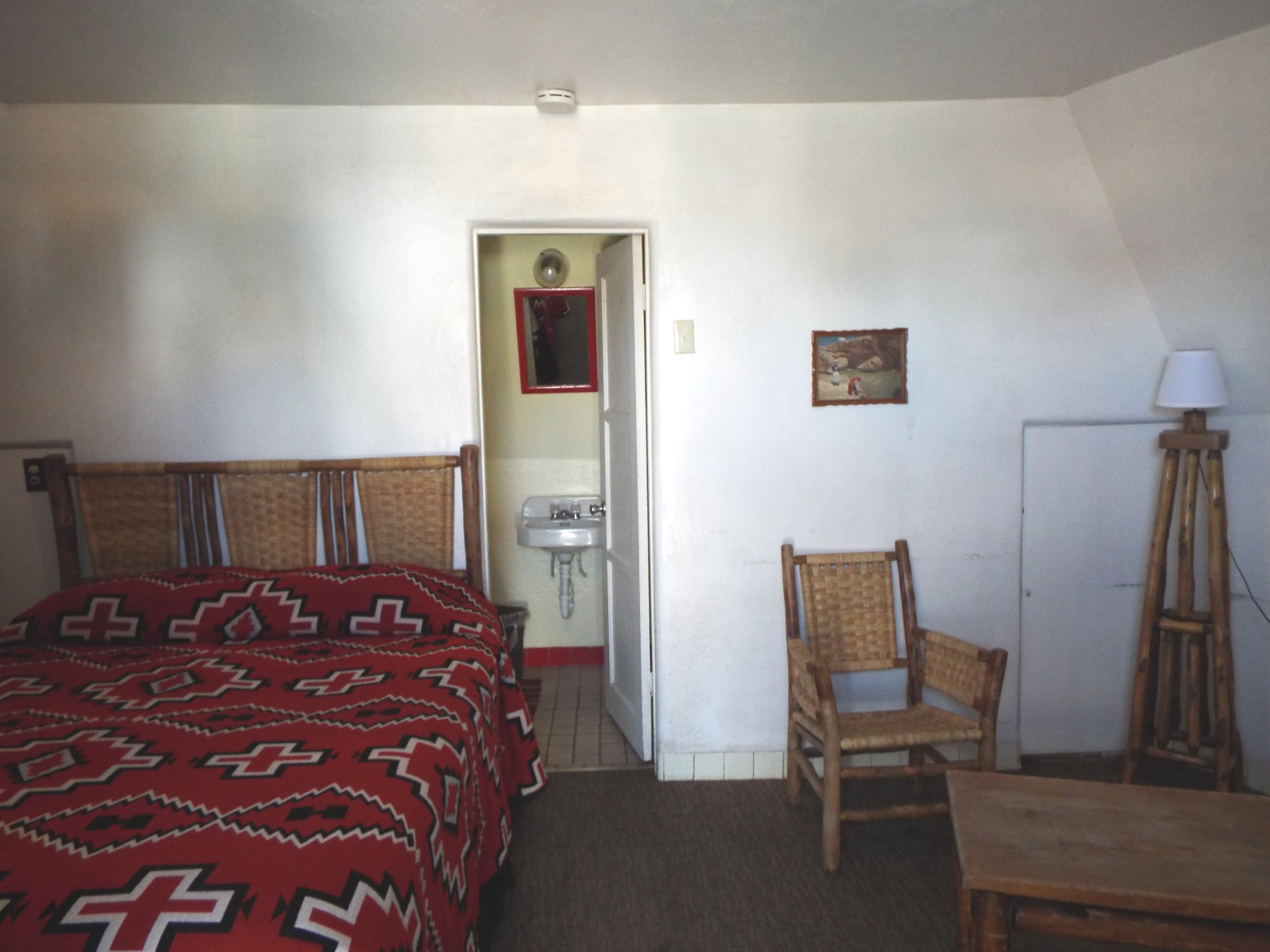
Inside a Wigwam Motel Tepee room
Petrified Forest National Park

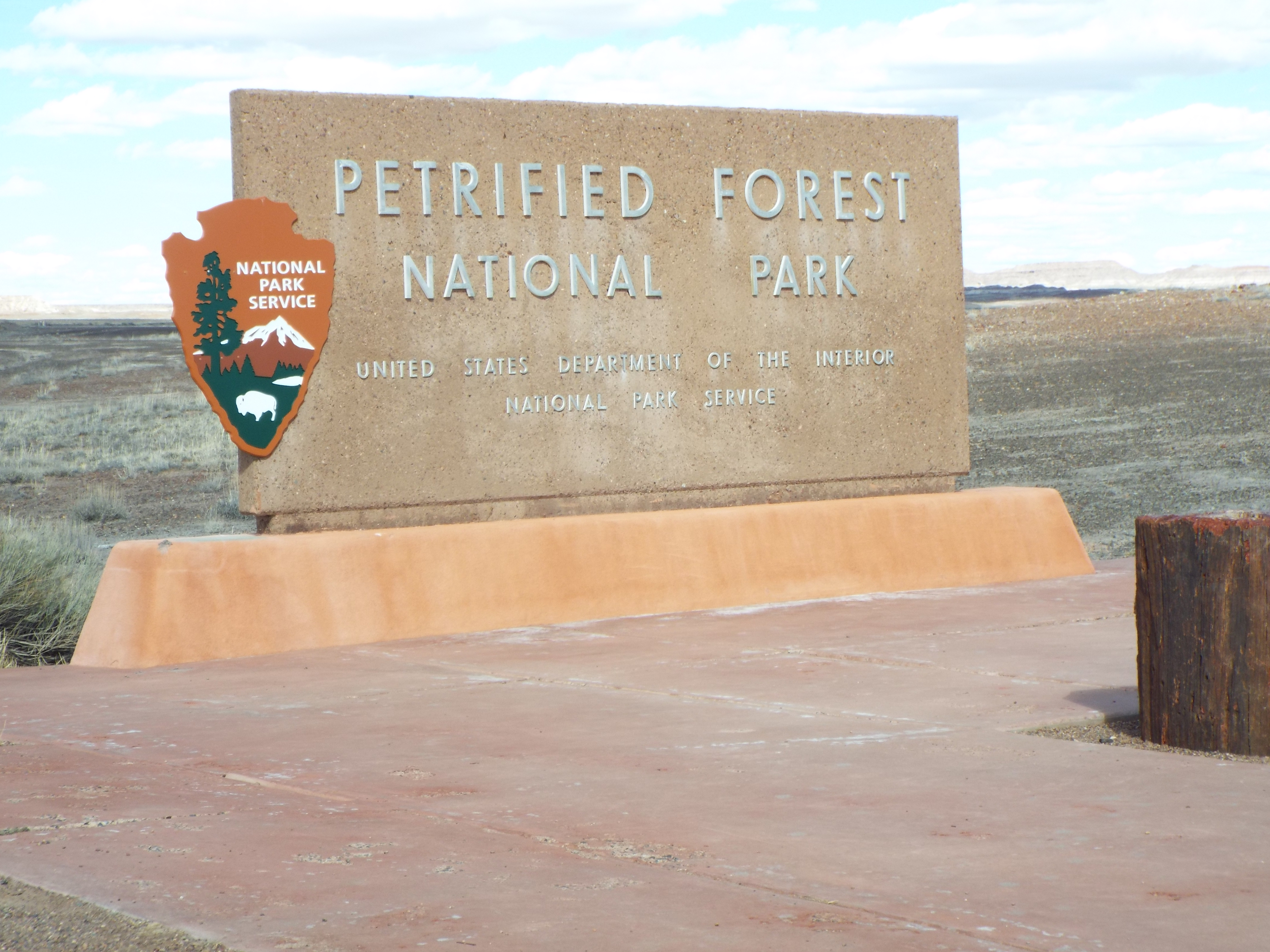
Petrified Forest National Park entrance

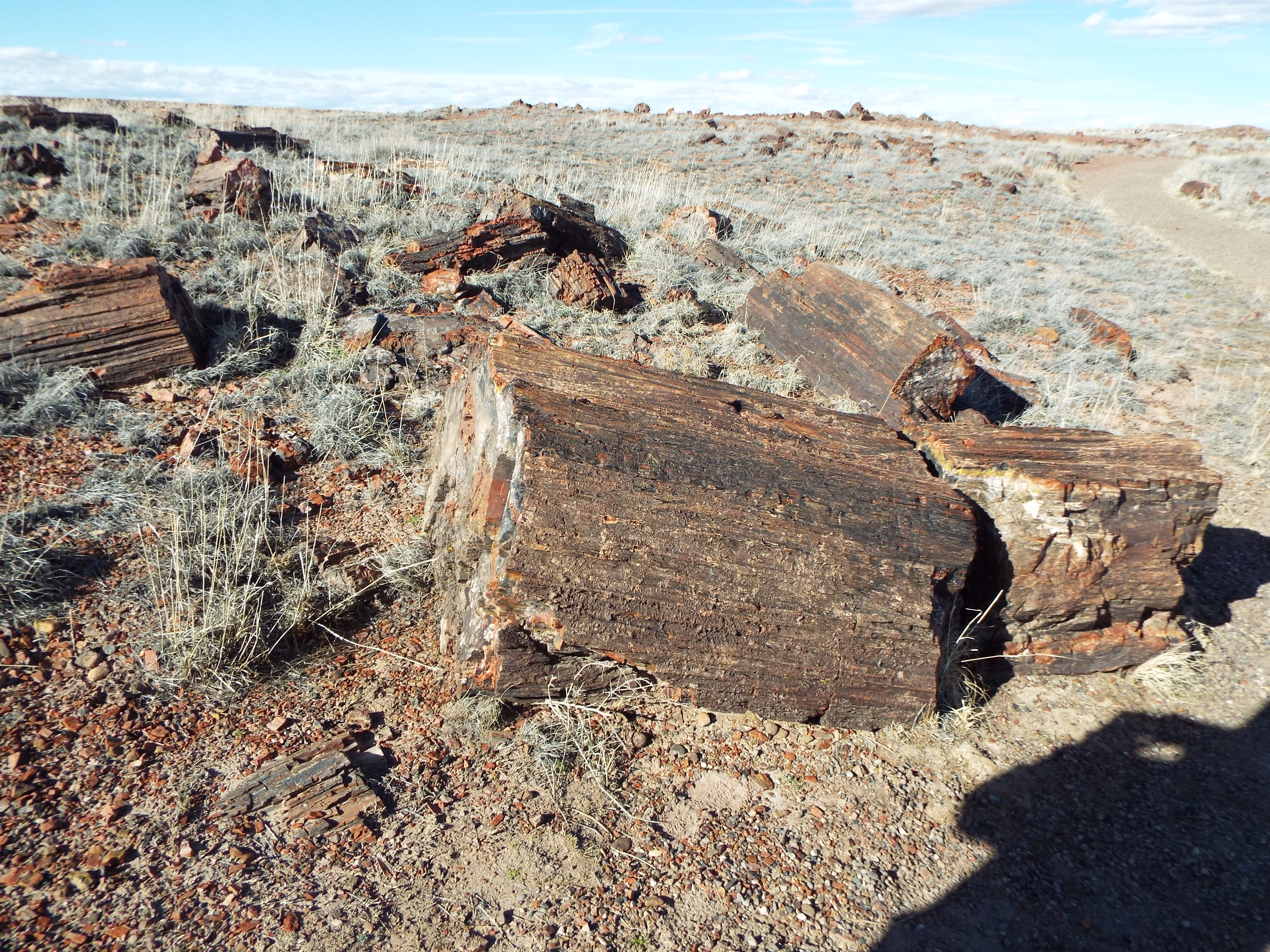
Petrified Wood

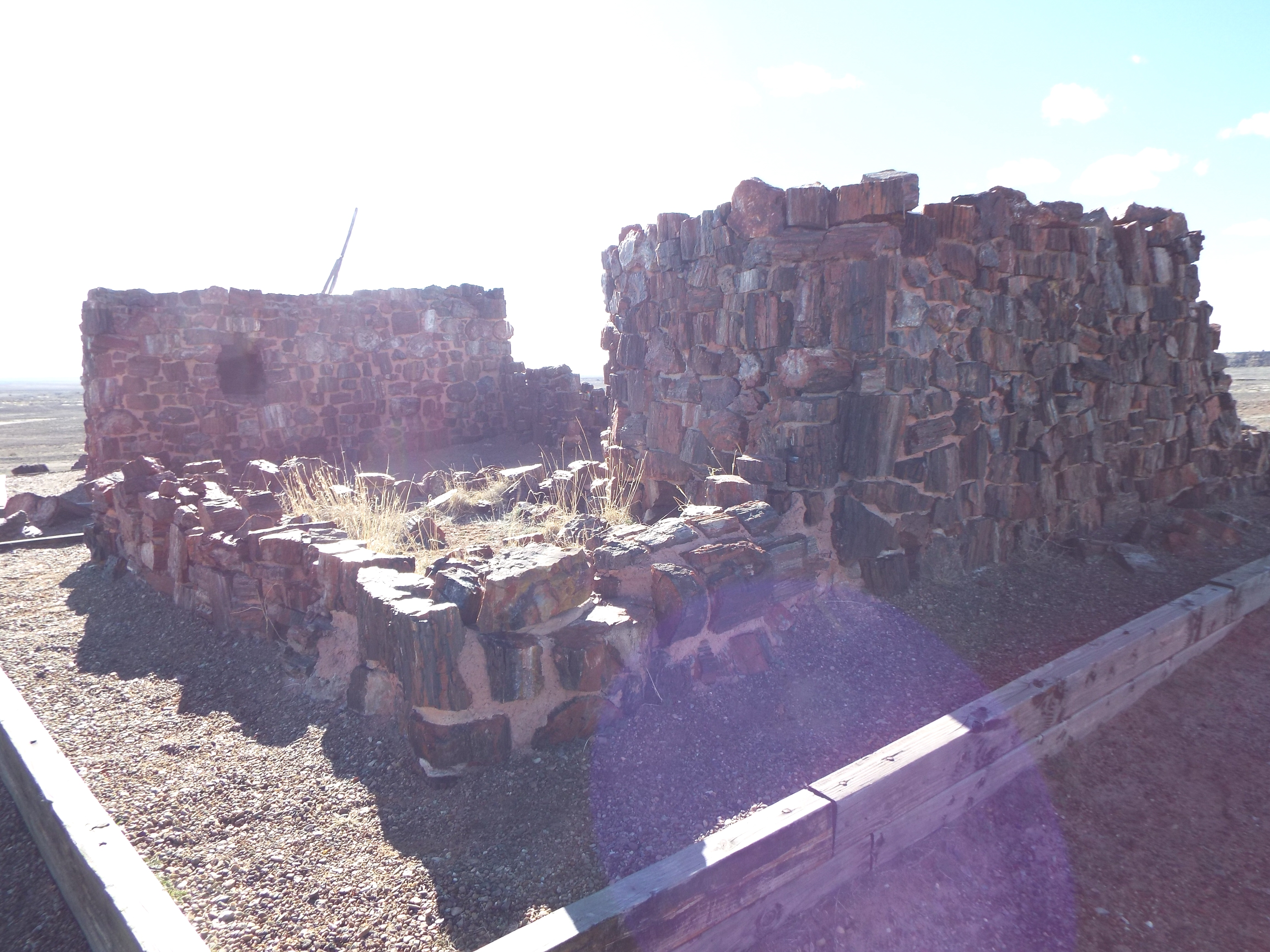
The Agate House

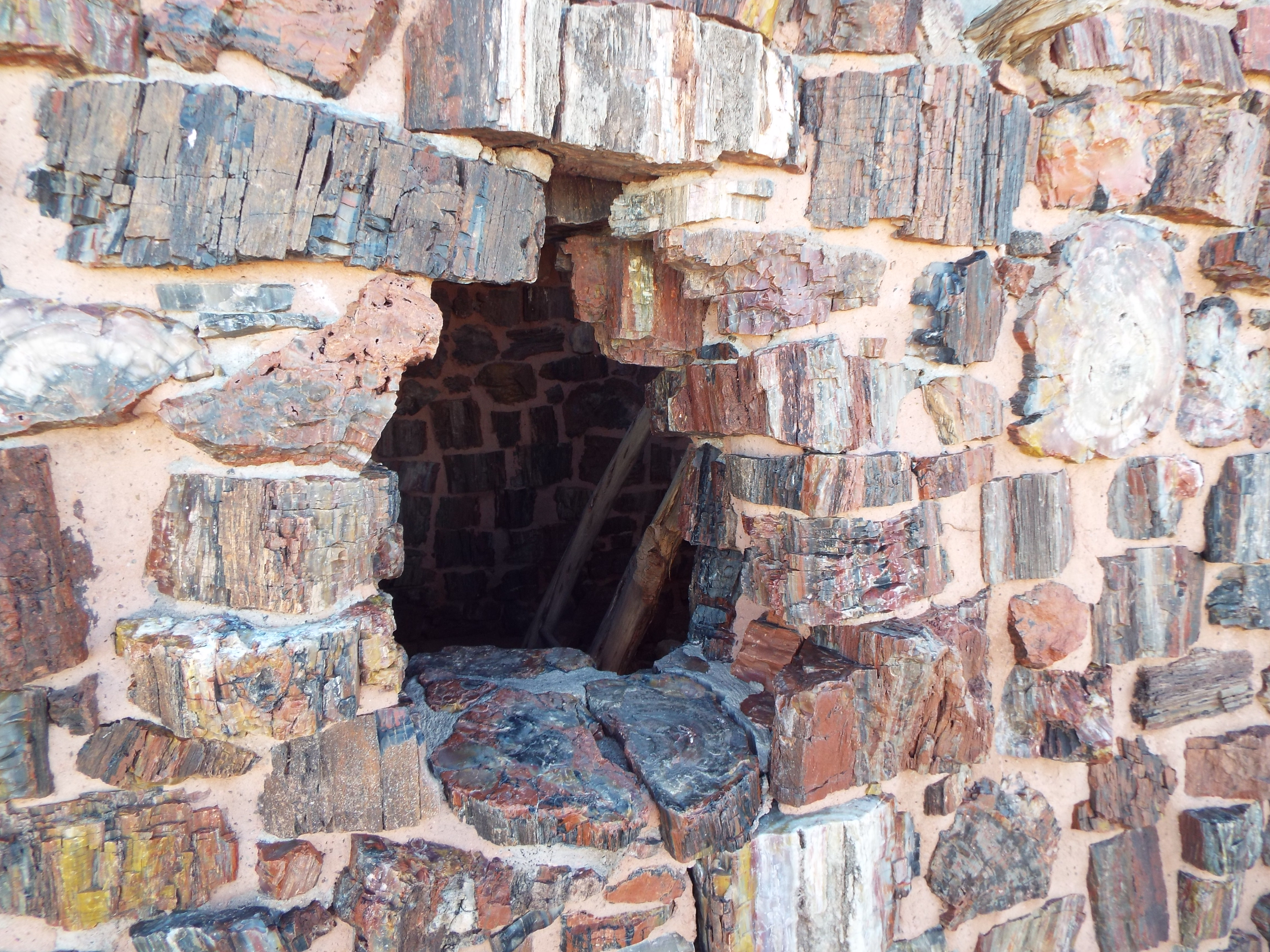
Agate House window

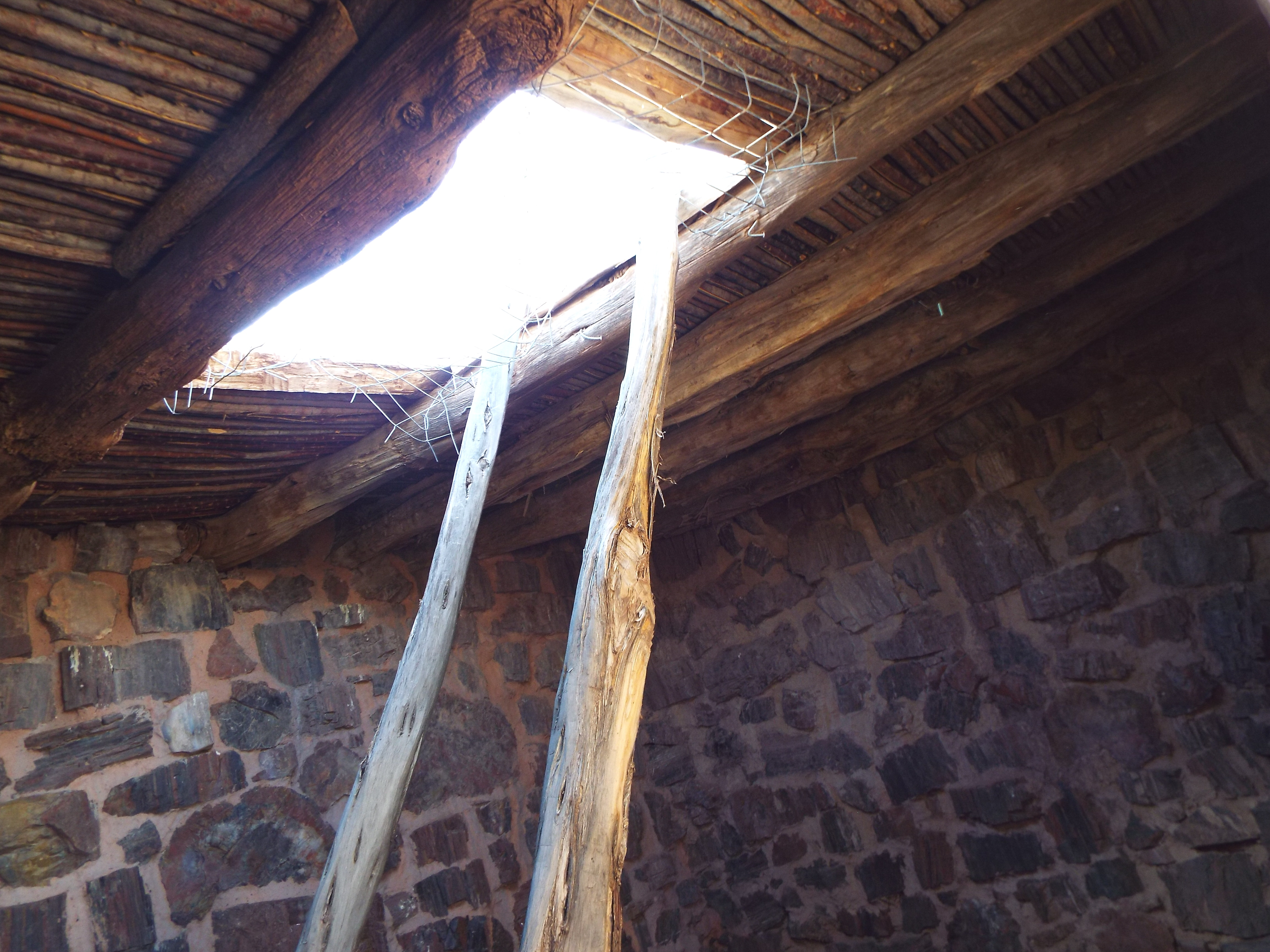
Roof entrance

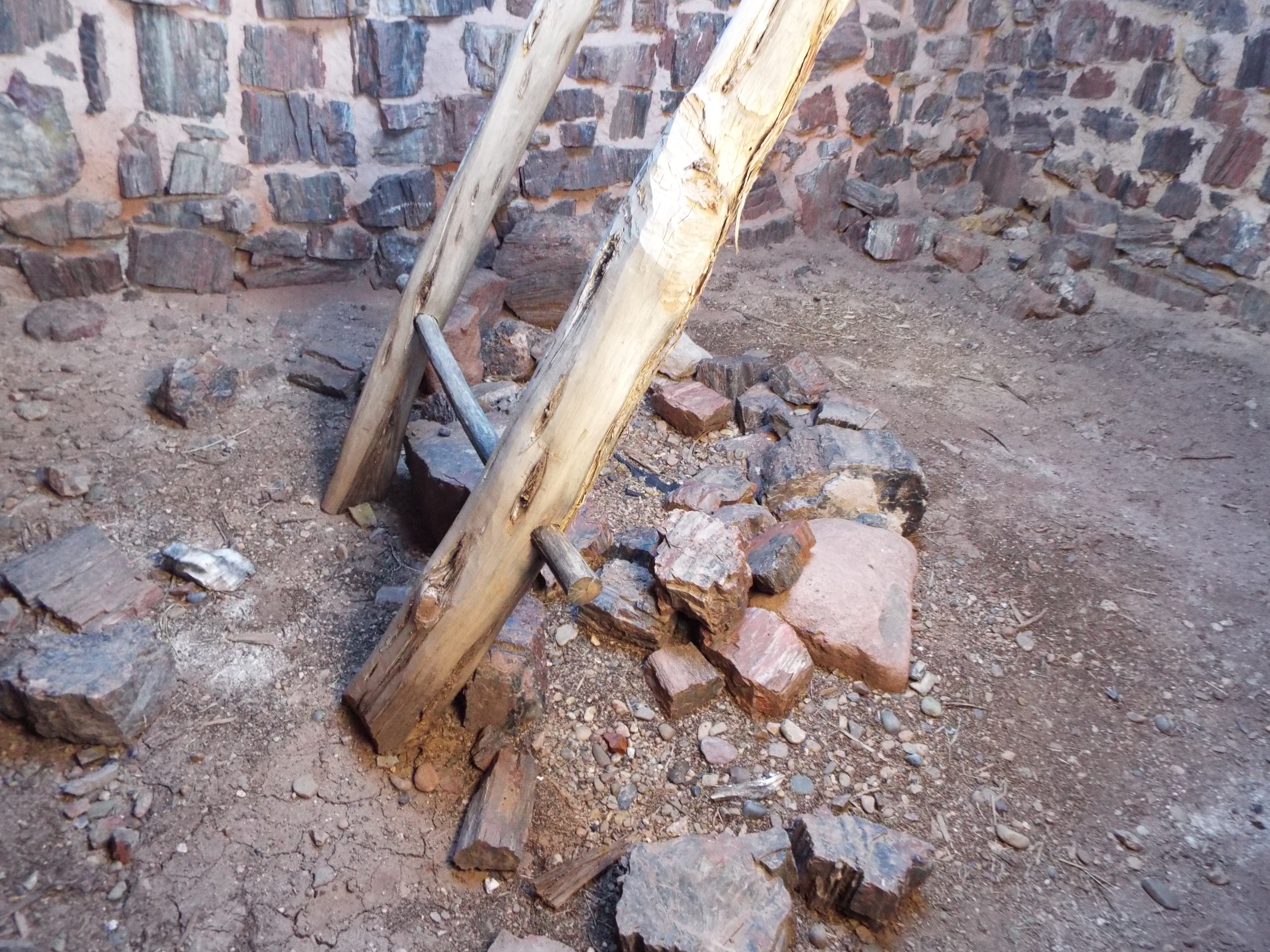
Where the meals were cooked

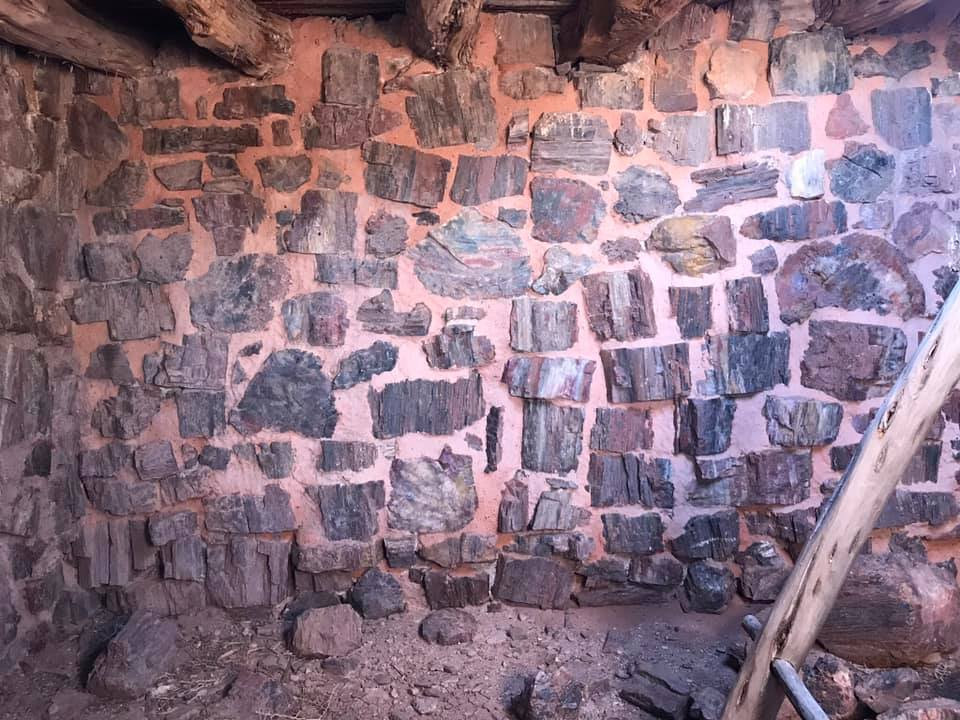
Wall inside the Agate House

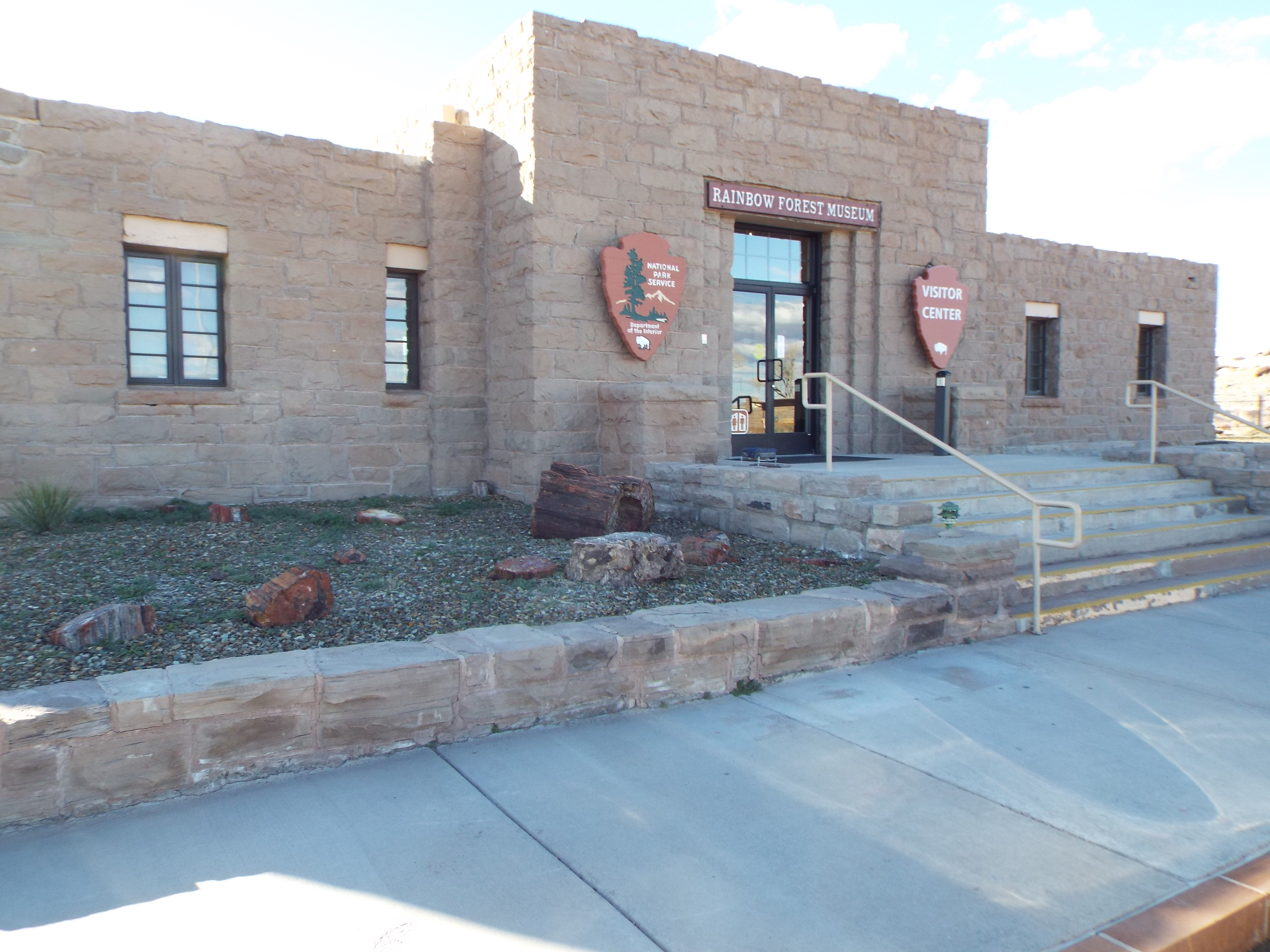
Rainbow Forest Museum

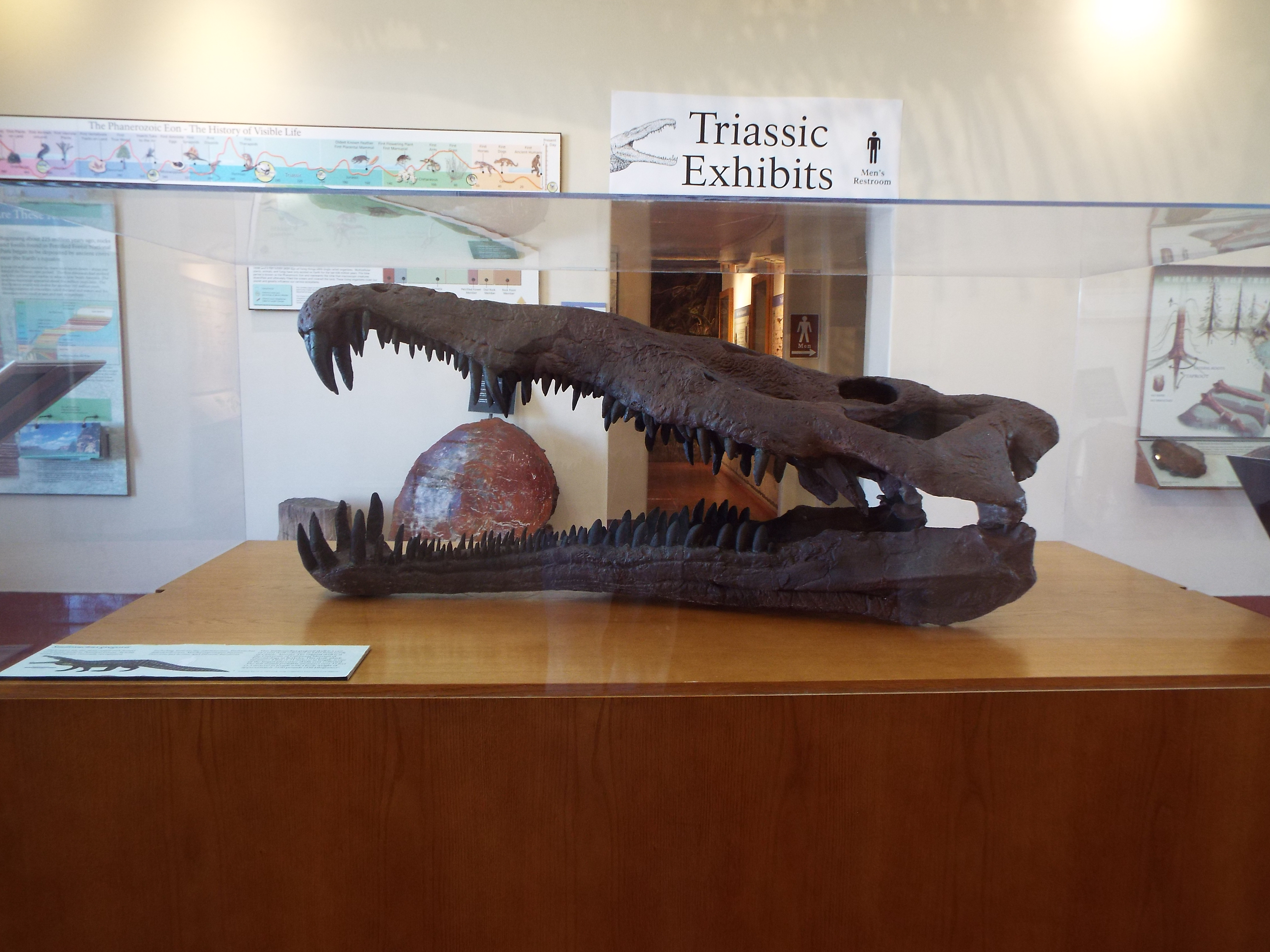
Skull of a Triassic Period dinosaur found in the Petrified Forest National Park

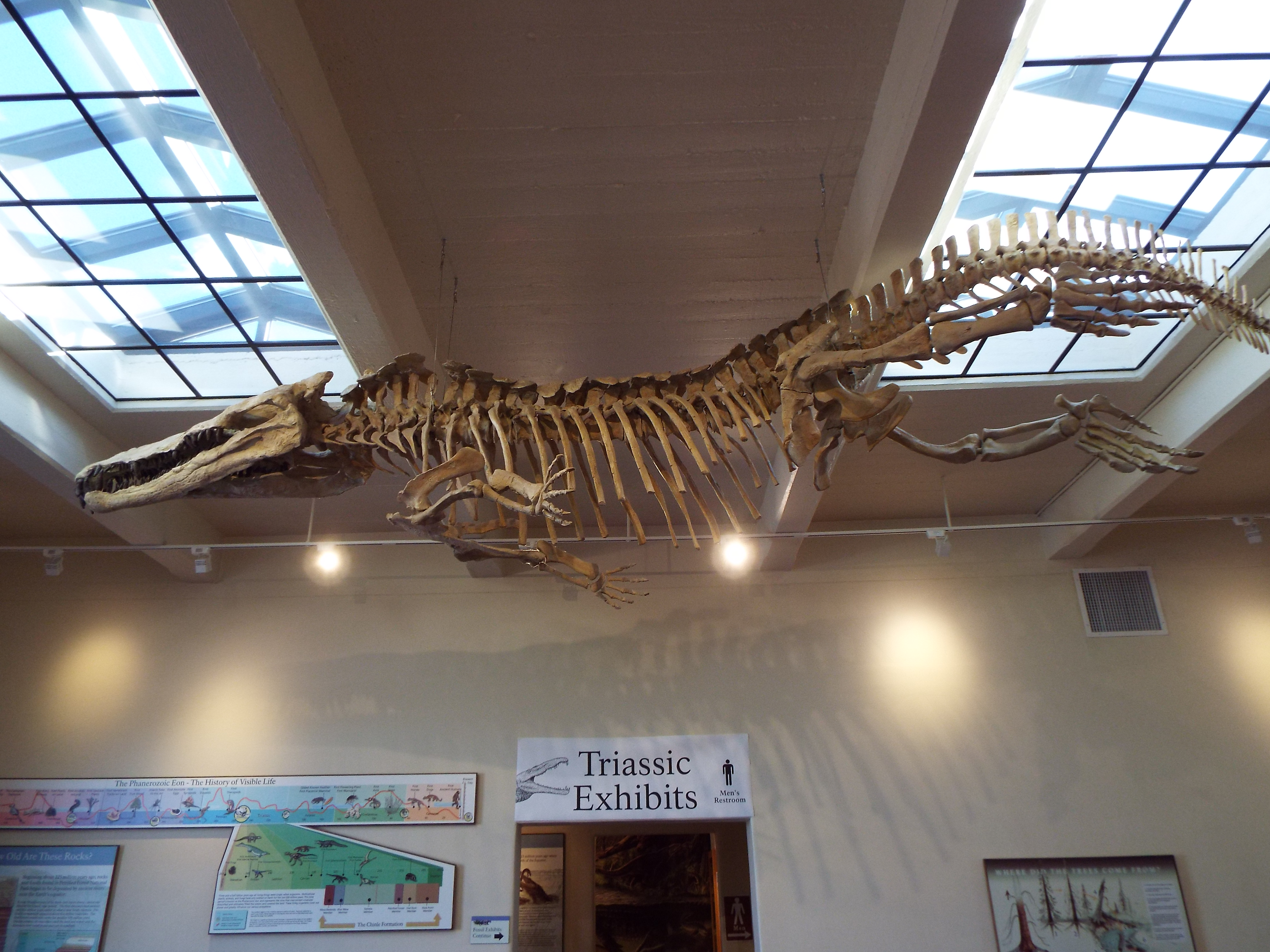
Another exhibit of a Triassic Period dinosaur found in the Petrified Forest National Park

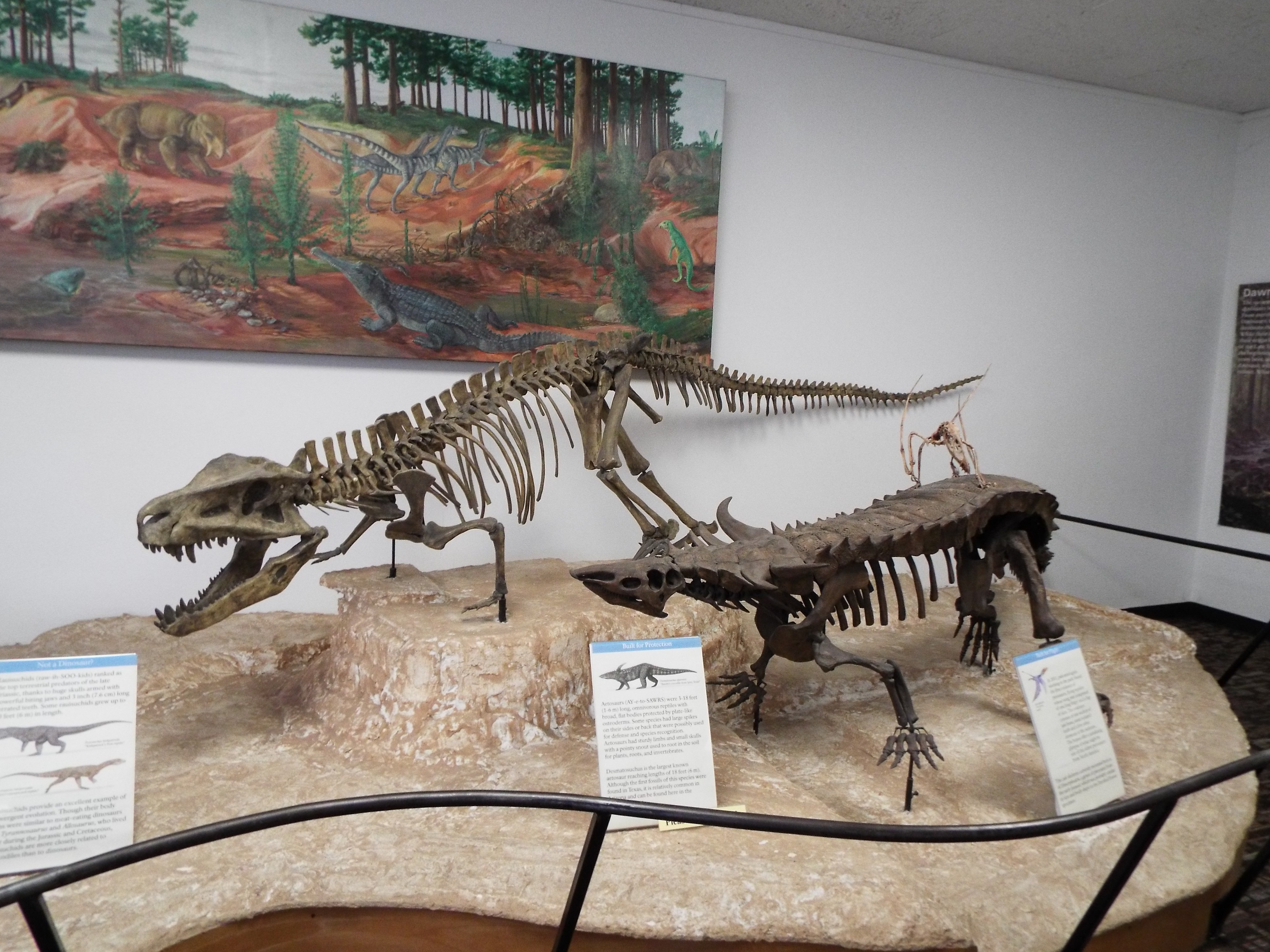
Two more skeletal remains of Triassic Period dinosaurs found in the Petrified Forest National Park

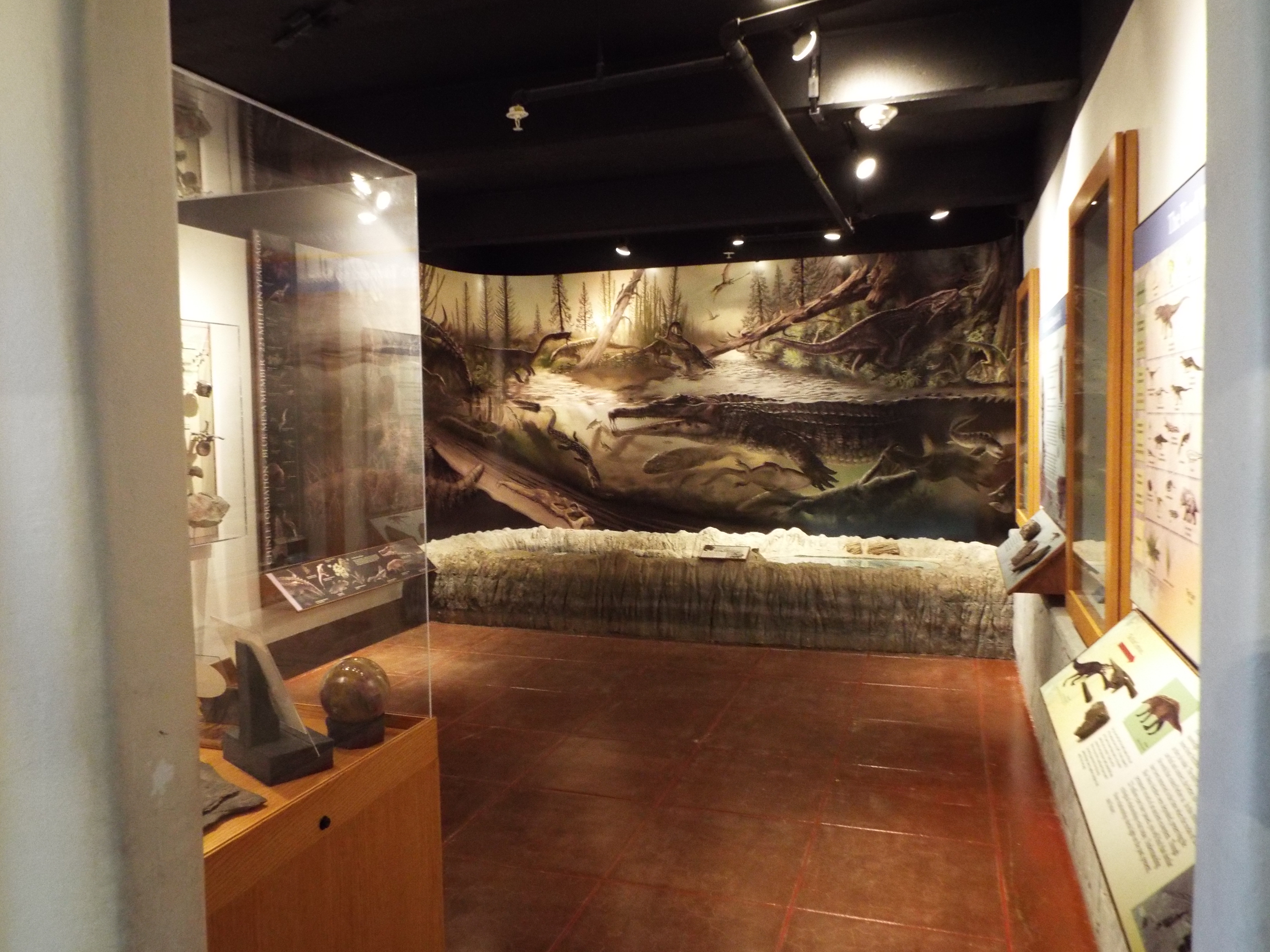
The Rainbow Forest Museum's Blue Room.

== Route 66 associated structures ==
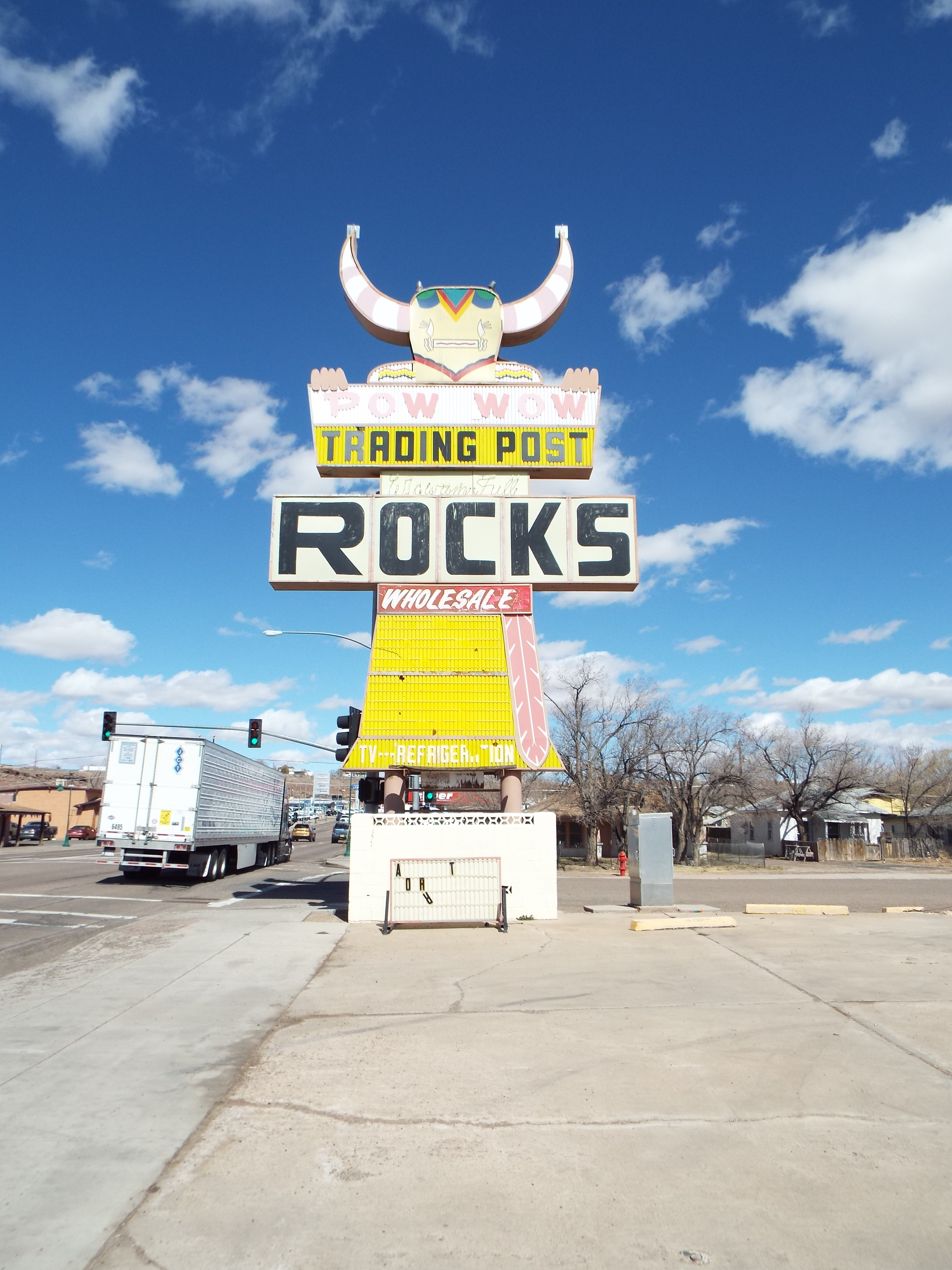
Vintage Pow Wow Motel sign on Route 66

According to the "Route 66 in Arizona Survey Report" the following structures are eligible to be listed in National Register of Historic Places:

- The Masonic Lodge building was built in 1916 and is located on 252 Navajo Blvd.
- Commercial Building built in 1925 and located 357 Navajo Blvd.
- Holbrook Inn (now America's Best Value Inn) built in 1959 and located at 720 Navajo Blvd.
- The Pow Wow Trading Post built in 1917 and located at 752 Navajo Blvd. According to the book Images of 66; by David Wickline, "The POW WOW Trading Post", used to be a Motel with Curio-Rock Shop in the early days. The rooms were converted into a larger Rock Shop & trading post, featuring all things Geological.
- Joe & Aggie's Café built in 1943 and located at 120 W Hopi Blvd. Joe & Aggie's was mentioned in the credits for the 2006 Disney-Pixar movie "Cars." Pixar production crew took a trip down Route 66 about 10 years ago for research purposes, and included the restaurant as one of its stops.
- The Roxy Theater was built in 1954 and is located at 153 W Hopi Dr. The theater has a seating capacity of 327.
- Woods Inn (now Holbrook Inn) built in 1968 and located at 221 W. Hopi Dr.
- Brad's Desert Inn built in 1961 and located at 301 W Hopi Dr.
- Sea Shell Motel (now Roseway Inn) built in 1947 and located at 612 W Hopi Dr.
- Mobil Service Station built in 1949 and located at 711 W. Hopi Dr.
- The Plainsman Restaurant built in 1966 and located at 1001 W Hopi Dr.
Route 66 in Holbrook

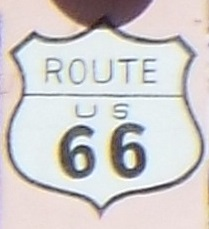
Route 66 in Holbrook

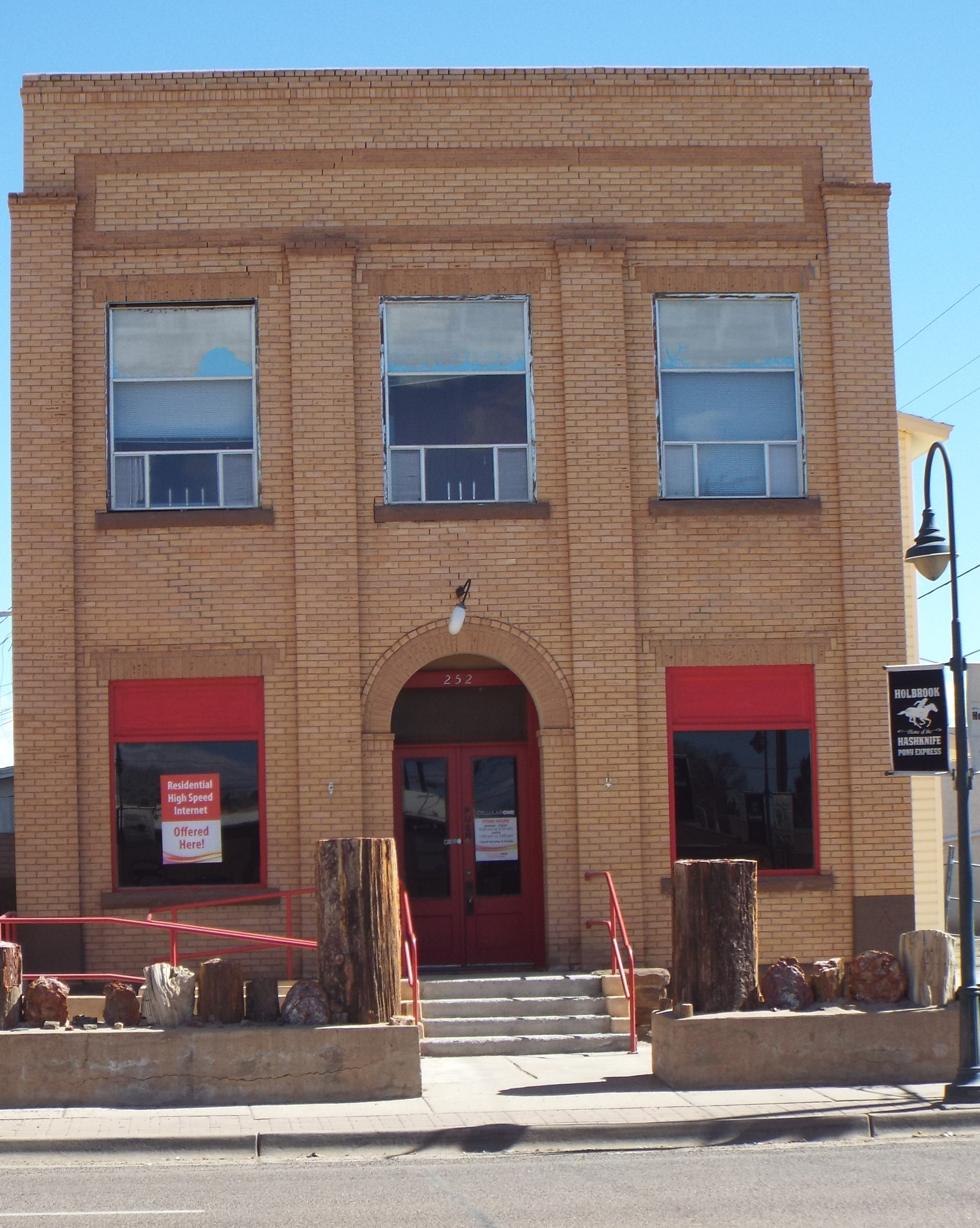
Masonic Lodge

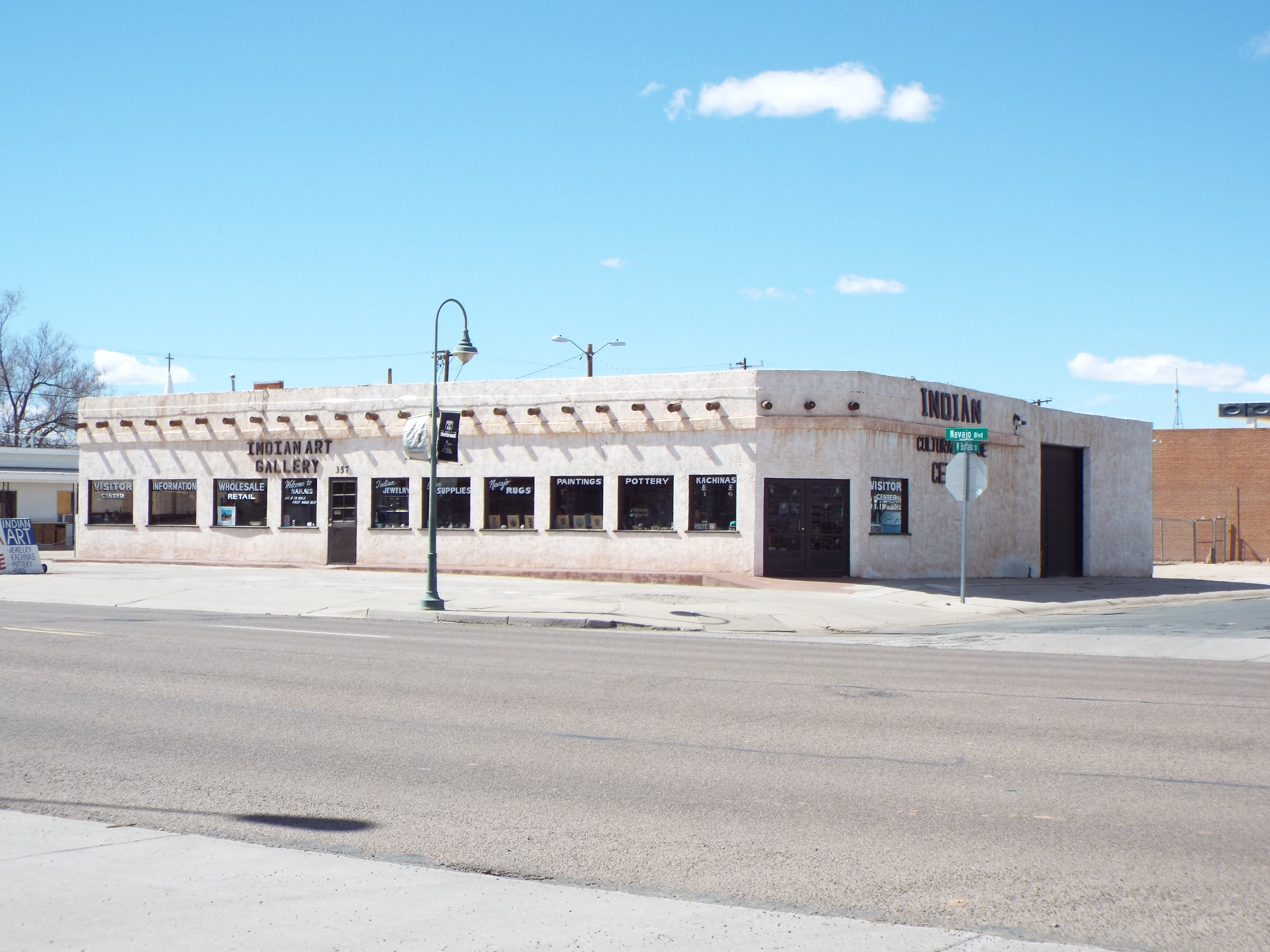
Holbrook Commercial Building

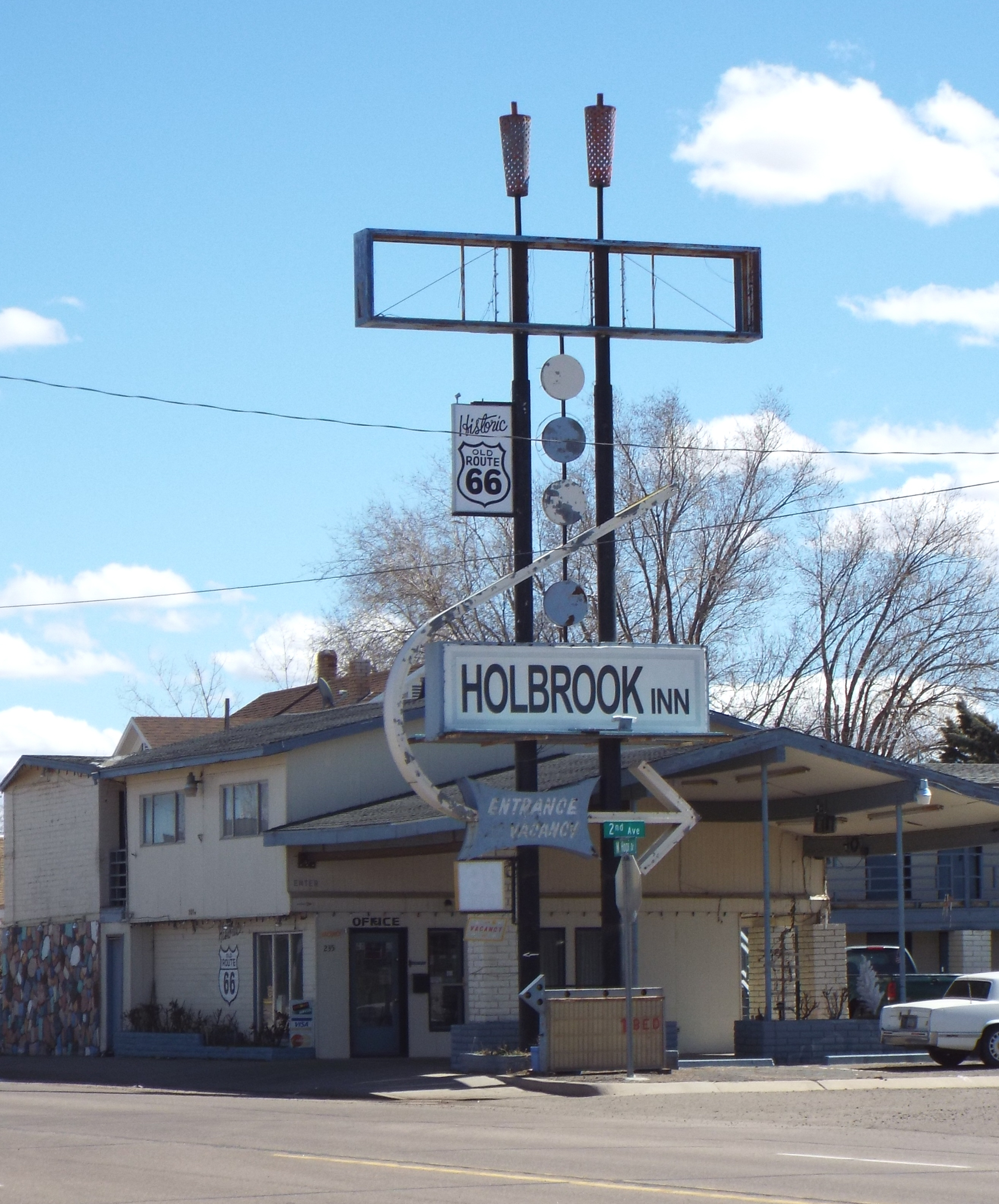
Holbrook Inn

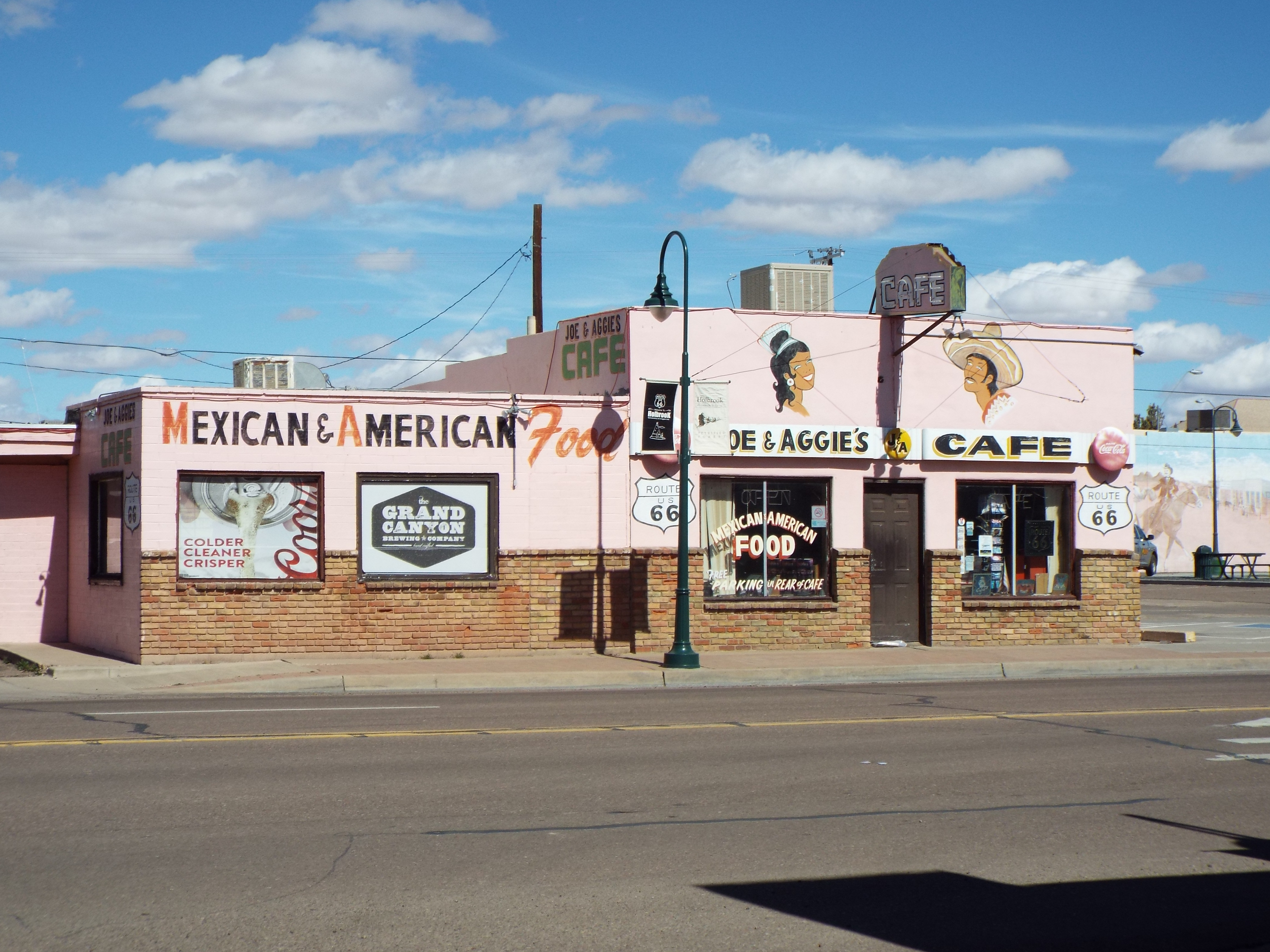
Joe & Aggie's Café

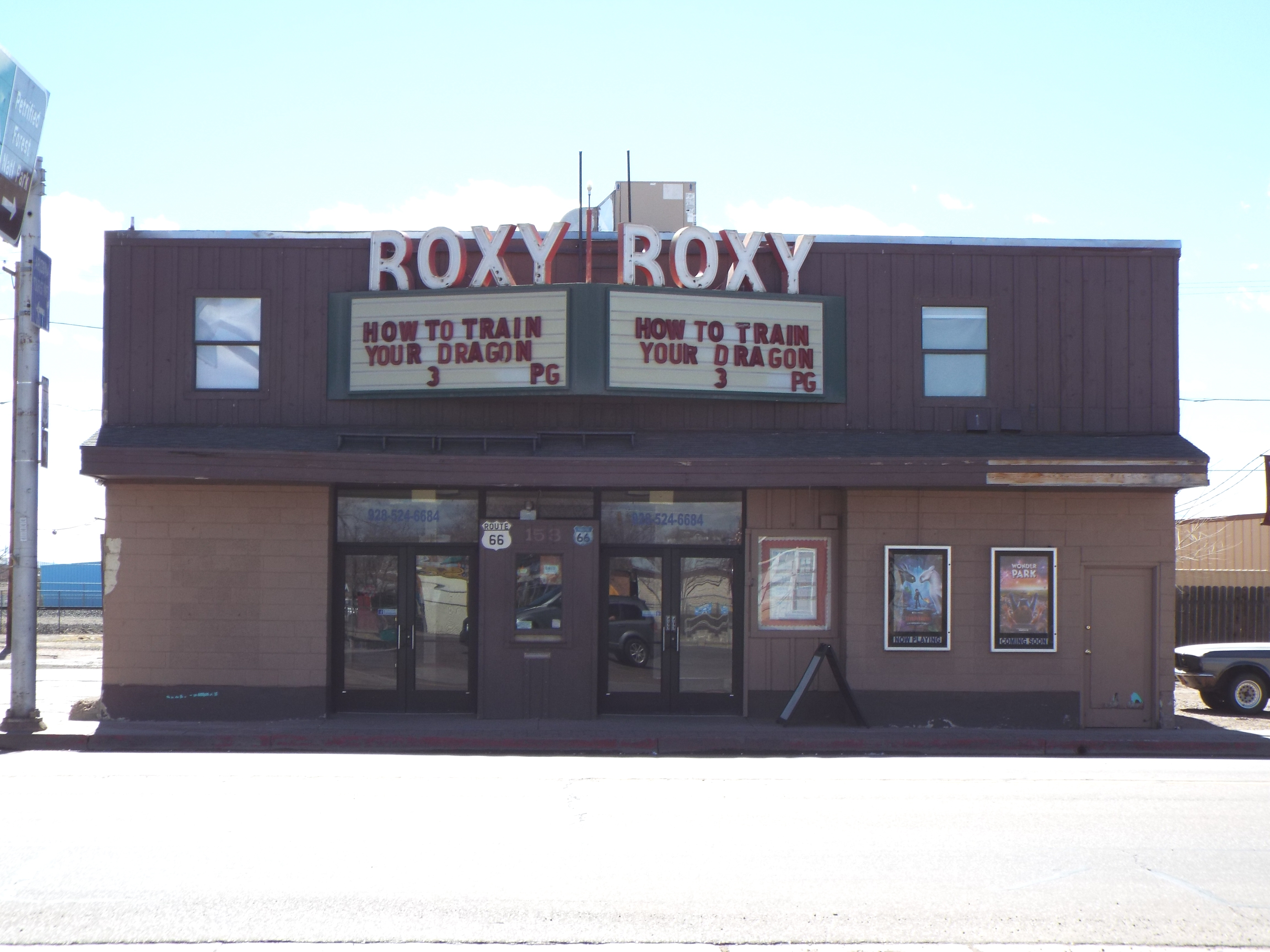
Roxy Theater

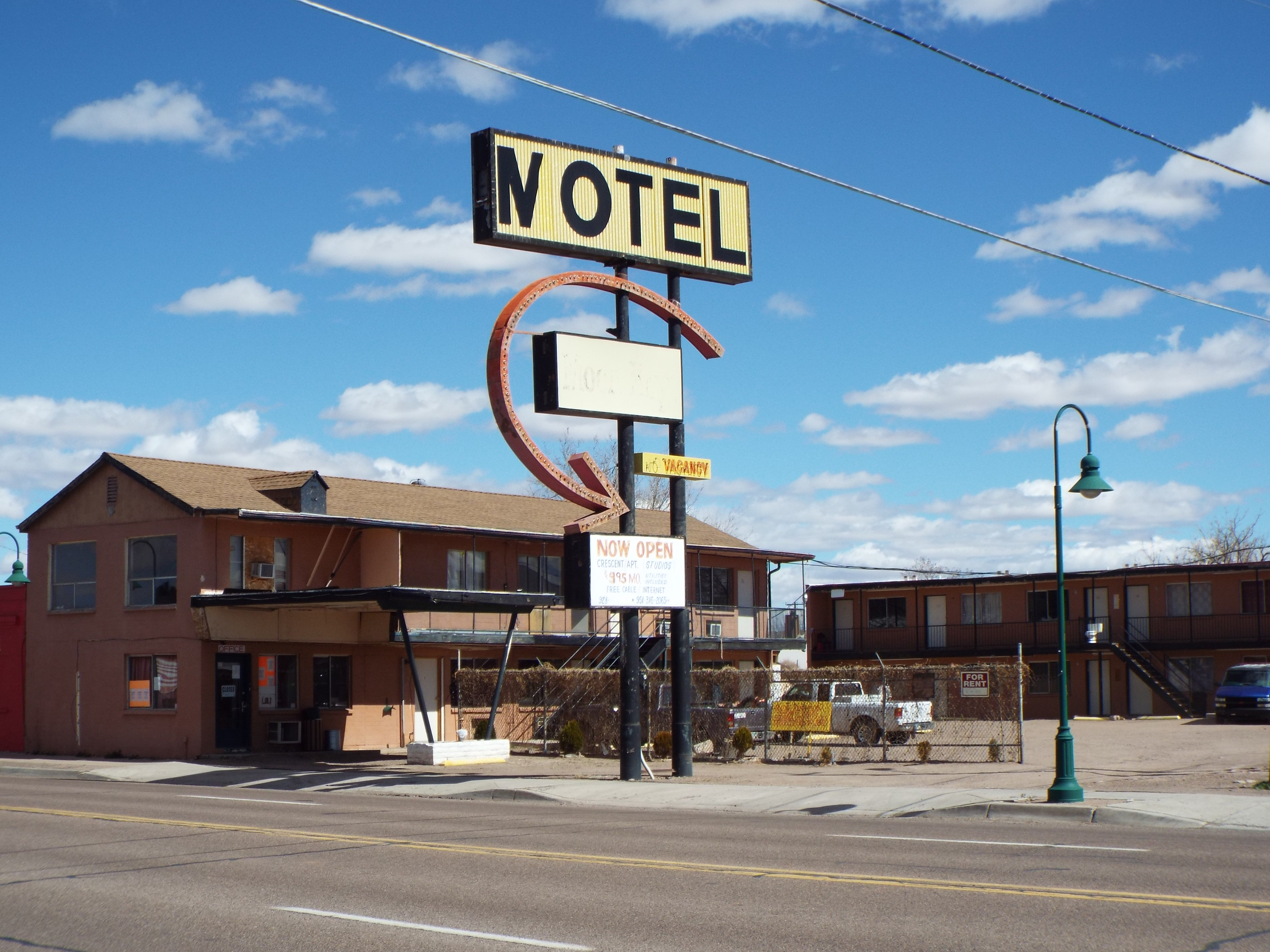
Woods Inn

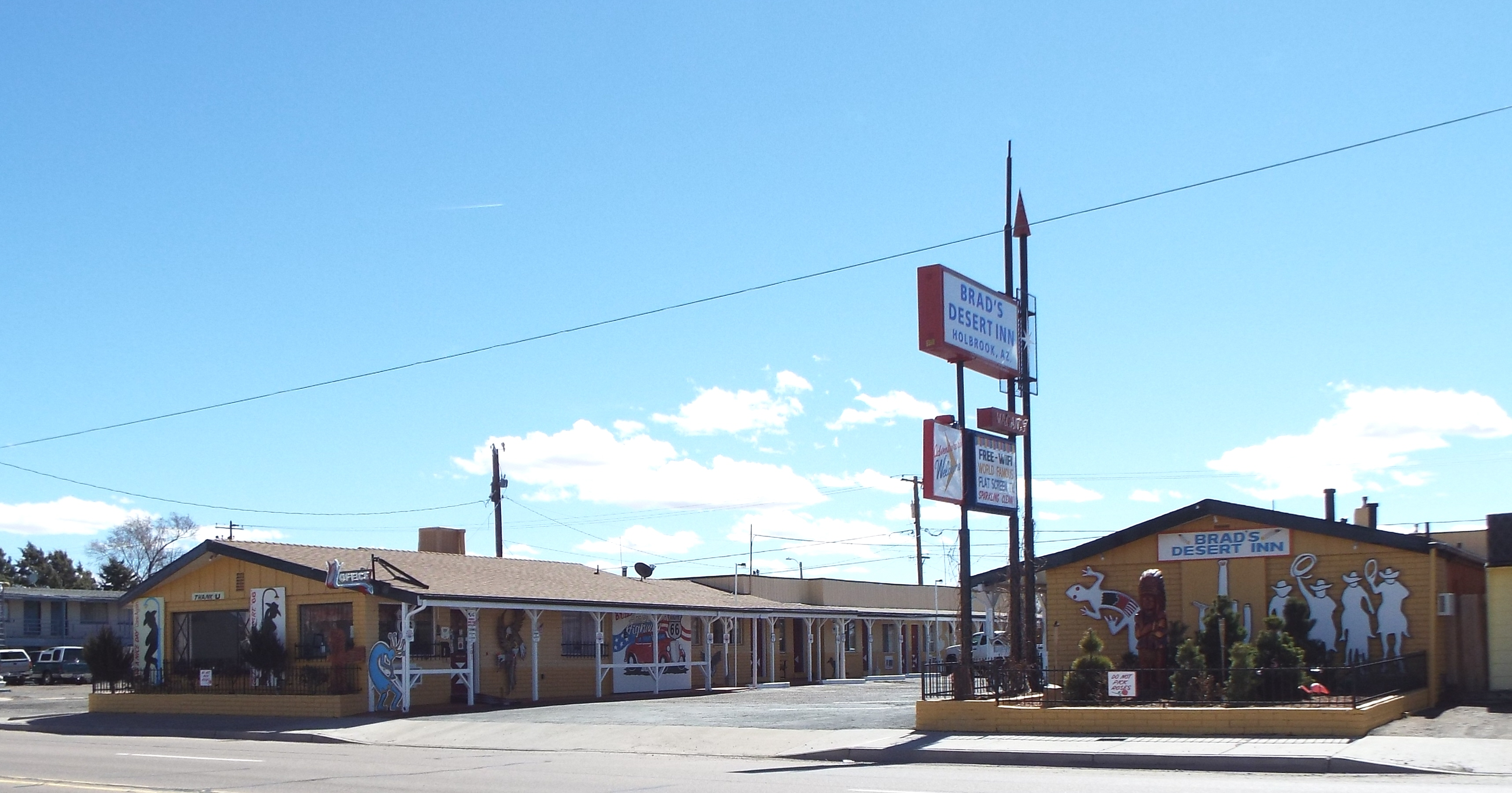
Brad's Desert Inn

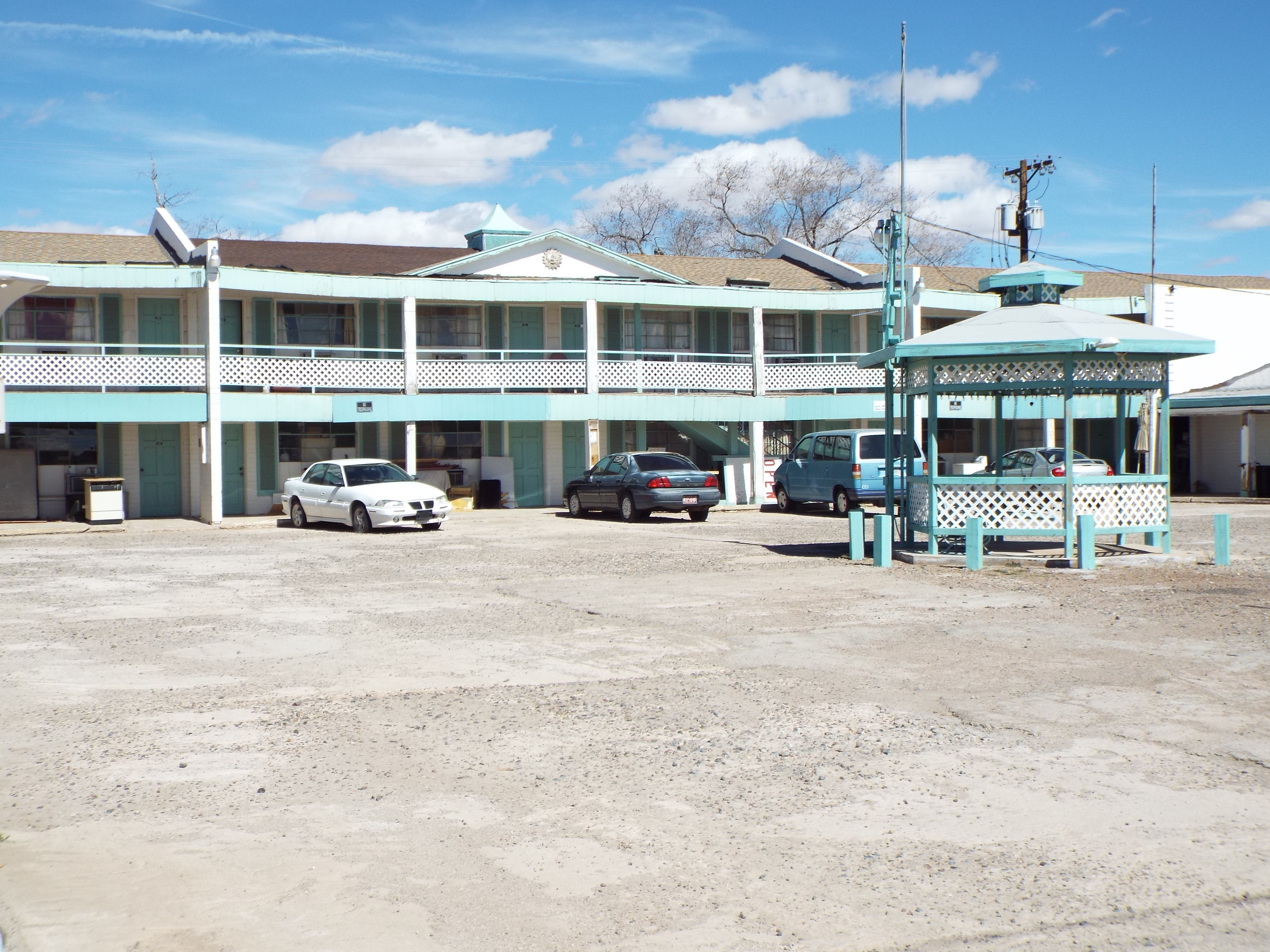
Sea Shell Motel (Roseway Inn)

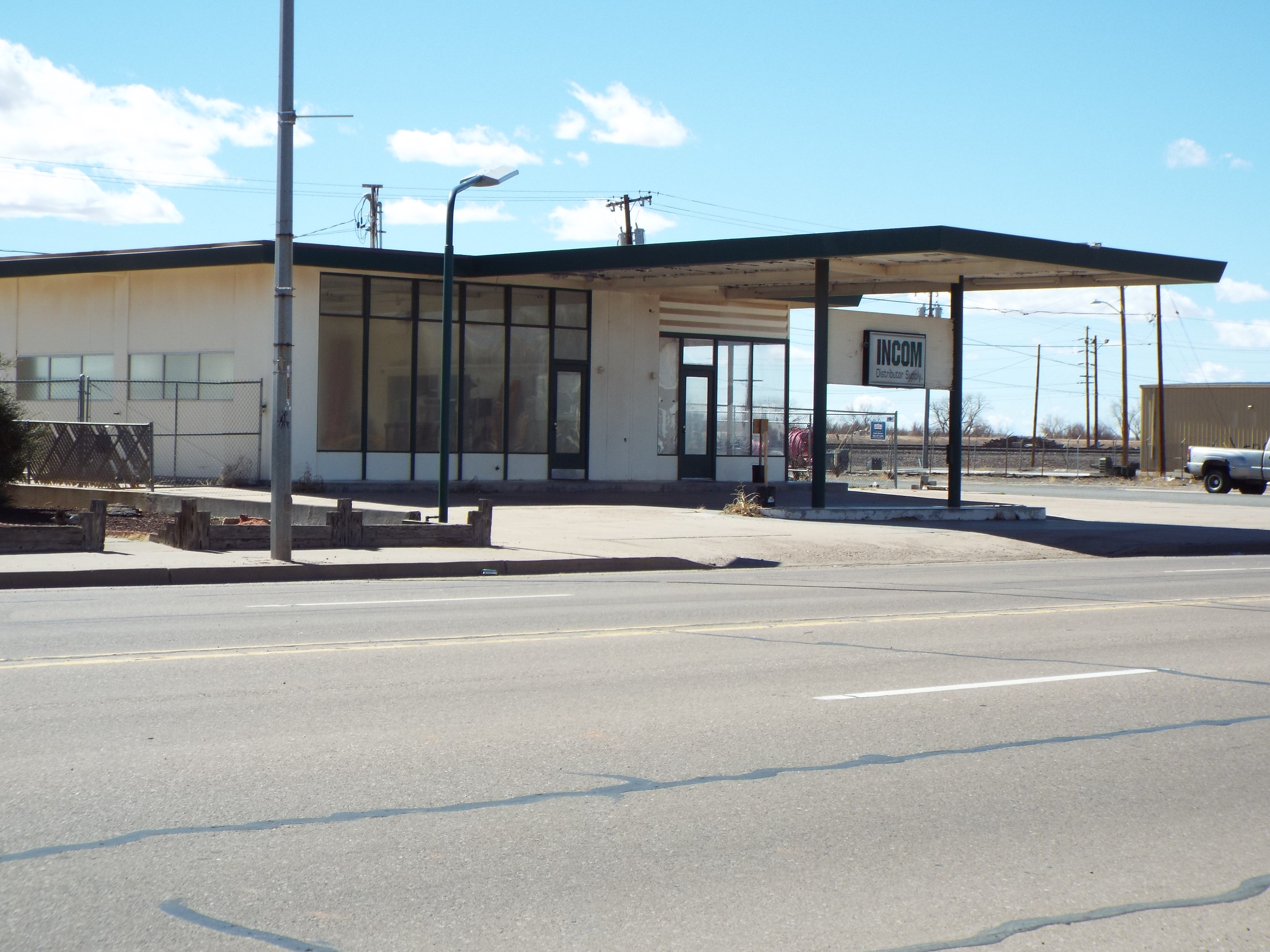
Mobil Service Station

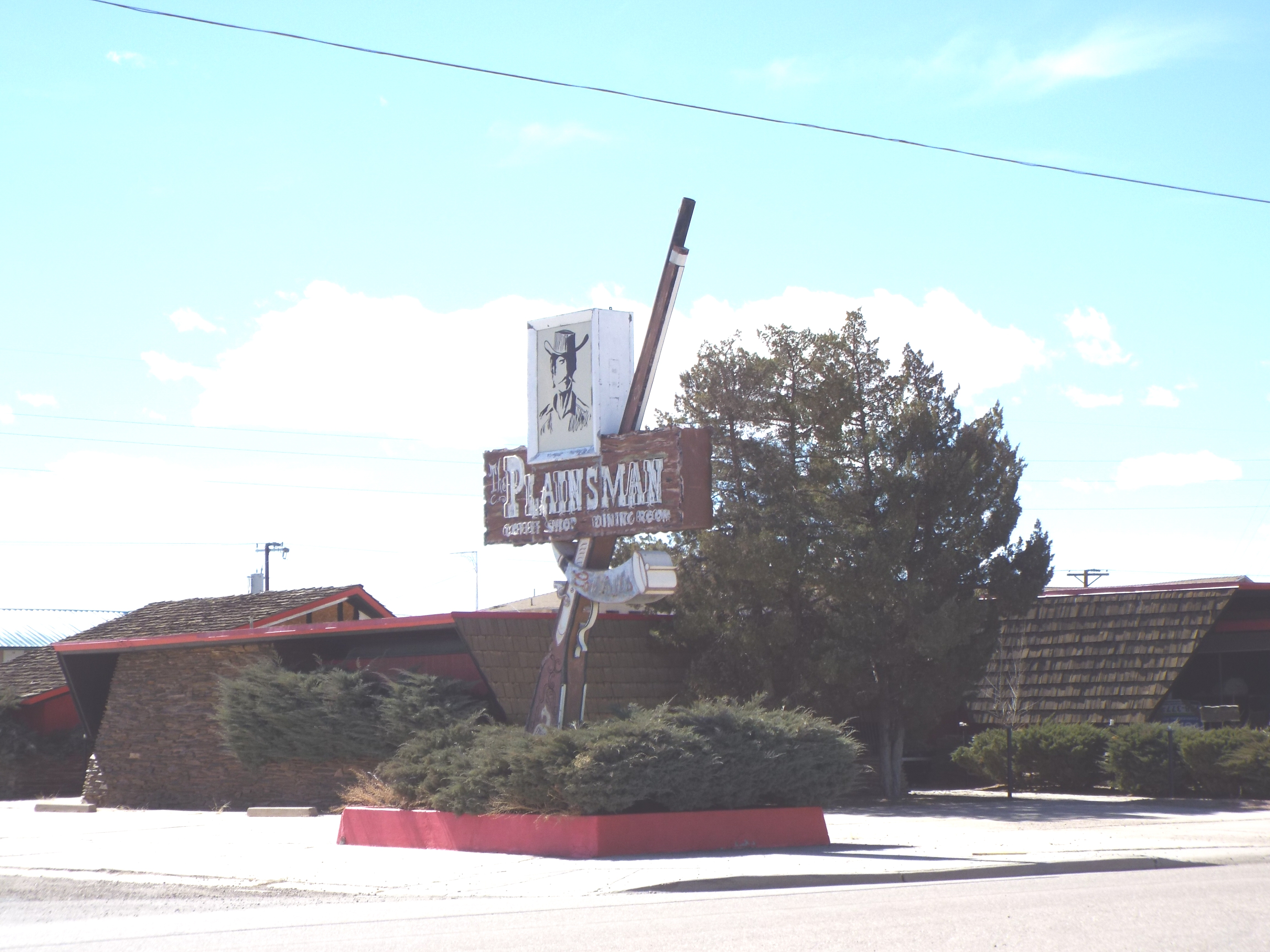
Plainsman Restaurant

== See also ==
- National Register of Historic Places listings in Navajo County, Arizona
