= Bucket of Blood =

Bucket of Blood may refer to:

- A Bucket of Blood, a 1959 film
- A Bucket of Blood (1995 film), a 1995 remake of the 1959 film
- Bucket of Blood (musical), an American musical
- The Bucket of Blood, a public house in Cornwall, UK
- Bucket of Blood Street, Holbrook, Arizona, USA
- Bucket of Blood Saloon, old West saloon in Arizona
- Bloody Mary (cocktail), originally called "Bucket of Blood"

== See also ==
- The Bloody Bucket (pub), DeSoto Caverns, Alabama, USA; a prohibition-era speakeasy
- 28th Infantry Division (United States), nicknamed "The Bloody Bucket"
- Blood Bucket (album), a 2004 album by New Zealand band Human (band)
