= Holbrook station (disambiguation) =

Holbrook station could refer to:

- Holbrook railroad station, a disused train station in Holbrook, Arizona, United States
- Holbrook station, a disused train station in Holbrook, New York, United States
- Holbrook Junction, Nevada, an unincorporated community in Douglas County, Nevada, United States
