= Tee Pee Restaurant =

- Formerly listed on the U.S. National Register of Historic Places
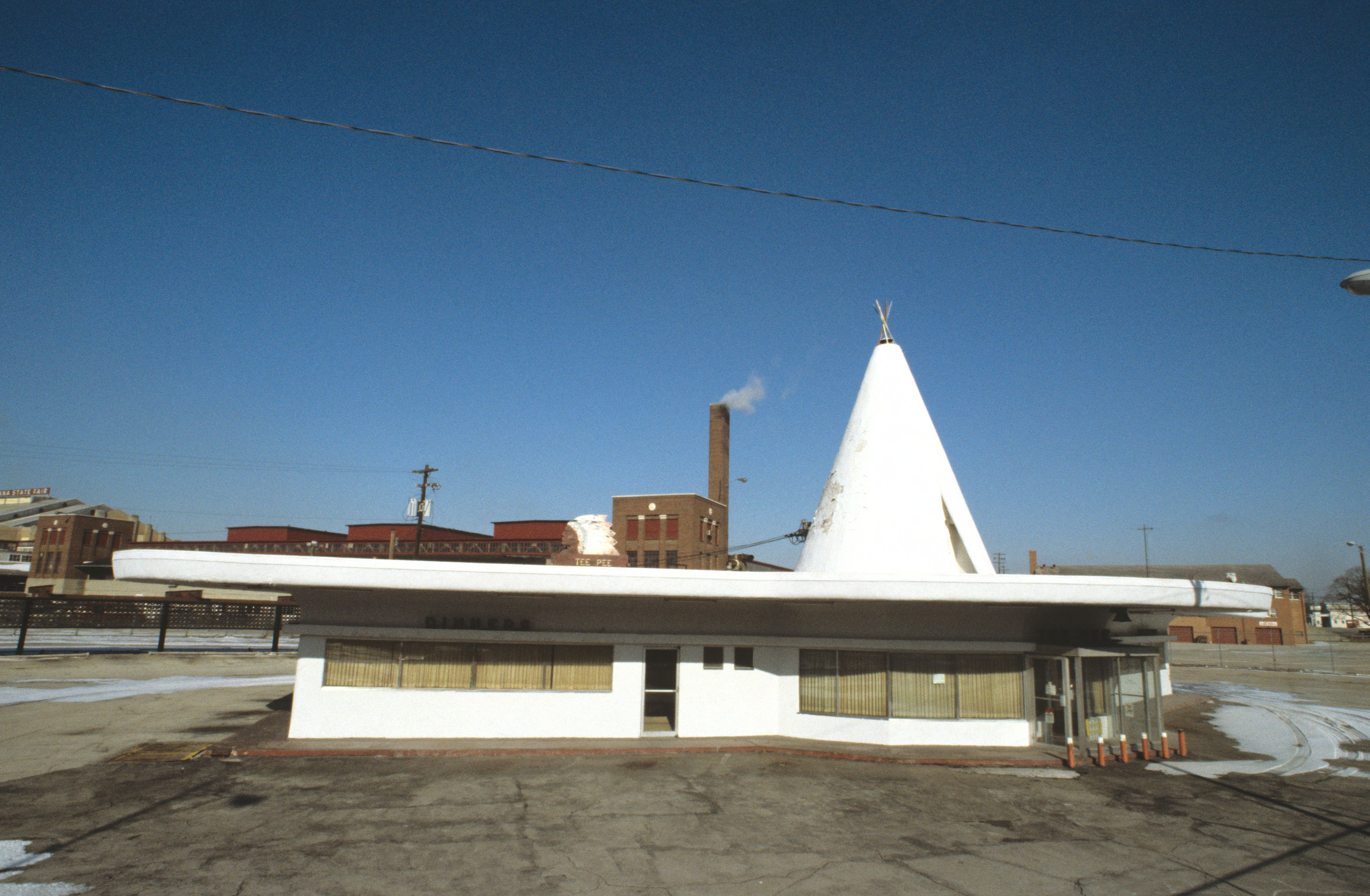
- Tee Pee Restaurant in 1986

- Location within Indianapolis Location within Indiana Location within the United States
- Location: 3820 Fall Creek Blvd., Indianapolis, Indiana
- Coordinates: 39°49′33″N 86°07′54″W
- Area: 1 acre (0.40 ha)
- Built: 1939, 1952
- Architect: Thornton, Maurice; Et al.
- Architectural style: Moderne
- NRHP reference No.: 86003374

Significant dates
- Added to NRHP: 1986
- Removed from NRHP: February 21, 1989

Tee Pee Restaurant was a drive-in restaurant in Indianapolis, Indiana, that began business in 1932. In 1939, the original building on Fall Creek Boulevard (now Parkway) was replaced with one having a central stuccoed teepee-shaped section with identical flanking wings. A cantilevered canopy extended around the building. Additions were made to the wings in 1952.

A second restaurant was opened in 1954 on the southside of the city, and a third one in 1964 on the far northside. All three closed (in reverse order of their openings) and were subsequently demolished at different times between 1968 and 1988.

The building on Fall Creek was listed on the National Register of Historic Places (NRHP) in 1986 and delisted in 1989.

== History ==
In July 1932, Albert Ray McComb and his wife Dorothy, along with Ethel Hughes, filed papers to incorporate Tee Pee, Inc. and opened a drive-in restaurant at 3820 Fall Creek Boulevard (now Fall Creek Parkway North Drive) at the intersection with 38th Street, on land leased from Indiana State Fair Board in the southeast section of the fairgrounds. The restaurant was in the shape of a teepee sitting directly on the ground. It was open only during the summer and had no indoor seating. Originally listed in the city directory as "Albert R. McComb restaurant", it took the name "Tee Pee Cone Shop" in 1936. Besides serving ice cream, it was the first Indianapolis drive-in to offer sandwiches and other items on its menu.

In 1939, McComb replaced the original building with a larger one that offered indoor dining. Maurice Thornton was the architect. The new building had a stuccoed teepee on the roof over the central portion of the restaurant and two identical wings to the north and the south. Native American motifs were painted on the teepee and interior walls, and were featured on the menus and advertising. The name "Tee Pee Restaurant" was officially adopted in 1940.

The restaurant served breakfast, lunch, and dinner seven days a week. In the 1940s, the Tee Pee became popular with Butler University students and with high school students, especially those from Arlington, Broad Ripple, Cathedral, Park, St. Agnes, Shortridge, and Tudor Hall. The increased business led to expansion of the kitchen and additions on the rear of each building wing in 1952, The architect for the additions was Frank Schroeder, assisted by Thornton. The basement was also enlarged at that time to provide more storage and work space.

The success of the first location led McComb to build a second restaurant in 1954 on the southside of Indianapolis at 2830 Madison Avenue, a mile south of Manual High School and a couple of miles north of Southport High School. The building was similar to the northside one, but smaller. In 1964, he opened a third Tee Pee restaurant at 1365 East 86th Street in the Nora neighborhood, but it closed in 1968, perhaps a result of McComb's death just as it was opening in June 1964.

The Tee Pee was known for its "Big Chief" and "Big Teep" hamburgers, as well as for its seafood, special salad dressing, and freshly baked pies.

By the 1970s, the drive-in craze was dying as more fast food restaurants were established and teenagers had more money at their disposal. Dorothy McComb died in 1974, and ownership of the restaurants passed to the couple's son, Charles. In 1978, he sold the Madison Avenue location to McDonald's, and within a few weeks the old building had been torn down and a new McDonald's had been erected.

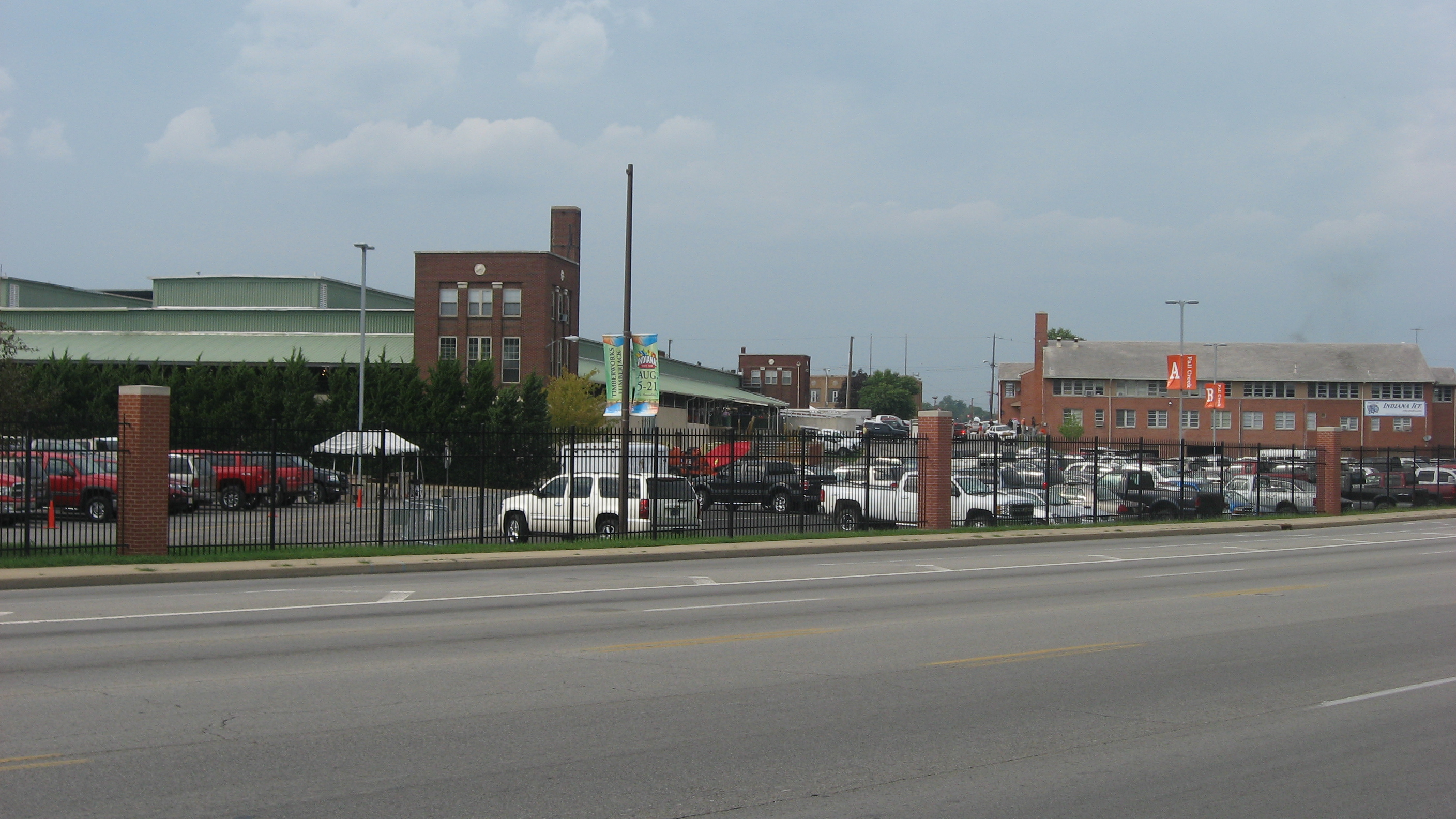
State Fair parking lots where the original restaurant stood

McComb sold the Fall Creek Tee Pee to Richard P. Turner in 1979. Turner had plans to reinvigorate the restaurant, but the Indiana State Fair Board, on whose land the restaurant was located, voted on February 12, 1982, to cancel the five-year lease in order to tear the building down and expand parking for the fair. Historic Landmarks Foundation of Indiana and other preservationists fought for six years to prevent the destruction, and were able to have the Tee Pee added to the National Register of Historic Places in 1986. Nevertheless, the restaurant was razed in June 1988 and removed from the NHRP on February 21, 1989.

In May 2007, the Indianapolis Business Journal reported that Turner, who still owned the rights to the Tee Pee trademark, was looking at locations for a new Tee Pee, including one somewhere on Madison Avenue. However, nothing came of that effort.

== See also ==
- Tee Pee Drive-In
- Wigwam Motel
- National Register of Historic Places listings in Marion County, Indiana
