= Holbrook Municipal Airport =

Airport in Navajo County, Arizona

- IATA: HBK; ICAO: none; FAA LID: P14

Summary
- Airport type: Public
- Owner: City of Holbrook
- Serves: Holbrook, Arizona
- Elevation AMSL: 5,262 ft (1,604 m)
- Coordinates: 34°56′27″N 110°08′19″W

Map
- Location within Arizona Location within the United States

Runways
Direction	Length		Surface
Direction	ft	m	Surface
3/21	6,698	2,042	Asphalt
11/29	3,202	976	Gravel/dirt

Statistics (2011)
- Aircraft operations: 3,630
- Based aircraft: 12
- Source: Federal Aviation Administration

Holbrook Municipal Airport (IATA: HBK, FAA LID: P14) is a public use airport located 3.5 miles (3.0 nmi; 5.6 km) northeast of the central business district of Holbrook, in Navajo County, Arizona, United States. It is owned by the City of Holbrook. This airport is included in the National Plan of Integrated Airport Systems, which categorized it as a general aviation facility.

== Facilities and aircraft ==
Holbrook Municipal Airport covers an area of 343 acres (139 ha) at an elevation of 5,262 feet (1,604 m) above mean sea level. It has two runways: 3/21 is 6,698 by 75 feet (2,042 x 23 m) with an asphalt surface; 11/29 is 3,202 by 120 feet (976 x 37 m) with a gravel and dirt surface.

For the 12-month period ending April 14, 2011, the airport had 3,630 general aviation aircraft operations, an average of 302 per month. At that time there were 12 aircraft based at this airport: 50% single-engine, 42% ultralight, and 8% multi-engine.

The airport is maintained by the city. There is fuel available for sale, and a pilots' lounge with TV, microwave, and restroom.

== Accidents and incidents ==
In April 1989, singer-songwriter John Denver was involved in an accident while piloting his 1931 vintage biplane. The plane was taxiing on the airport's runway while attempting to land at Holbrook for refueling on a flight from Carefree, Arizona, to Santa Fe, New Mexico. A wind gust caught the plane, causing it to spin. The plane sustained extensive damage, though Denver was unharmed.

== See also ==
- List of airports in Arizona
