= Tee Pee Drive-In =

- TeePee Drive-in marquee in August of 2026
- Interactive map of Tee Pee Drive-In
- Address: 13166 W Ozark Trail; Sapulpa, Oklahoma; United States
- Coordinates: 35.9945°N 96.1404°W
- Capacity: 400 cars
- Type: drive-in theater
- Screen: 1

Construction
- Built: 1949
- Opened: May 5, 1950; 76 years ago
- Years active: 1950–1982, 1983–1999, 2023–present

Website
- https://www.teepeedrivein.com/

Tee Pee Drive-In is a historic drive-in theater located on an old alignment of U.S. Route 66 in Sapulpa, Oklahoma. The drive-in theatre was first built in 1949 and opened on May 5, 1950. The theatre used a type of paving for its pathways, unlike other drive-ins at the time which used dirt pathways.

The Tee Pee Drive-In ran smoothly through the 1950s, showing movies to thousands of people. On May 5, 1960, exactly 10 years after the drive-in theatre first opened, an F5 tornado struck the town of Sapulpa, nearly destroying the drive-in theatre. However, the theatre was back up and running a month later after repairs were made. The drive-in experienced two different break-ins a week apart later that year. In August 1966, a fire broke out at the theatre, destroying the concession stand.

Drive-In theatres across the nation began to die out during the 1970s and 1980s thanks to the rise of indoor movie theatres. The Tee Pee Drive-In wasn't spared from these closures when its owner, Video Theatres, closed the drive-in theatre along with many others in 1982. The theatre remained closed for about 18 months before new owners bought the property from Video Theatres, reopening the drive-in theatre on March 18, 1983. The theatre was passed around to different owners through the 1980s and 1990s before being closed again in 1999. The drive-in sat abandoned for just over two decades, deteriorating further and further through time.

In 2020, the COVID-19 pandemic led to the practice of social distancing, which in turn led to a resurgence in drive-in theatres that remained open across the nation. This led a local group to purchase the abandoned Tee Pee Drive-In property in 2021, which made renovations to the property over the next two years, including 12 Spartan trailers that can be rented on Airbnb. The Tee Pee Drive-In reopened on April 15, 2023.

== See also ==
- Tee Pee Restaurant
- Wigwam Motel
- List of drive-in theaters
