= Holbrook, Arizona =

City in Navajo County, Arizona, US

Holbrook
- City
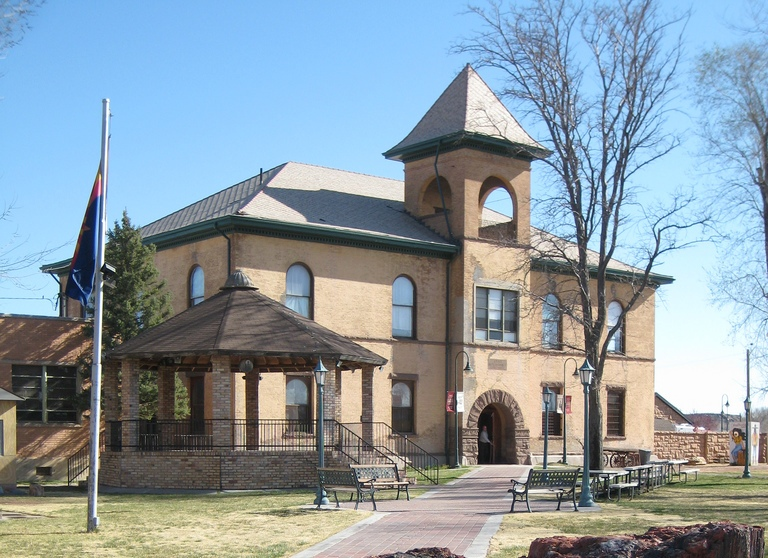
- Historic Navajo County Courthouse and Museum

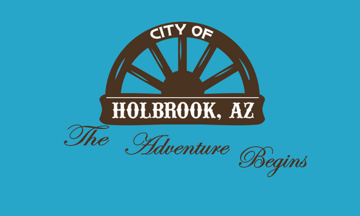
- Flag Logo
- Motto: "Gateway to the Petrified Forest"
- Location of Holbrook in Navajo County, Arizona

- Location in United States
- Coordinates: 34°54′6″N 110°9′31″W
- Country: United States
- State: Arizona
- County: Navajo
- Incorporated: 1917

Government
  - Type: Council-Manager
  - Body: Holbrook City Council
  - Mayor: Kathleen Smith

Area
  - Total: 17.37 sq mi (44.99 km^{2})
  - Land: 17.34 sq mi (44.92 km^{2})
  - Water: 0.027 sq mi (0.07 km^{2})
- Elevation: 5,076 ft (1,547 m)

Population (2020)
  - Total: 4,858
  - Density: 280.1/sq mi (108.15/km^{2})
- Time zone: UTC-7 (MST (no DST))
- ZIP code: 86025
- Area code: 928
- FIPS code: 04-33280
- GNIS ID(s): 2410773
- Airport: Holbrook Municipal Airport
- Website: www.holbrookaz.gov

Holbrook (Navajo: Tʼiisyaakin) is a city in Navajo County, Arizona, United States. As of the 2020 census, Holbrook had a population of 4,858. The city is the county seat of Navajo County.

Holbrook was founded in 1881 or 1882, when the railroad was built, and named to honor the first chief engineer of the Atlantic and Pacific Railroad, Henry Randolph Holbrook.

== History ==
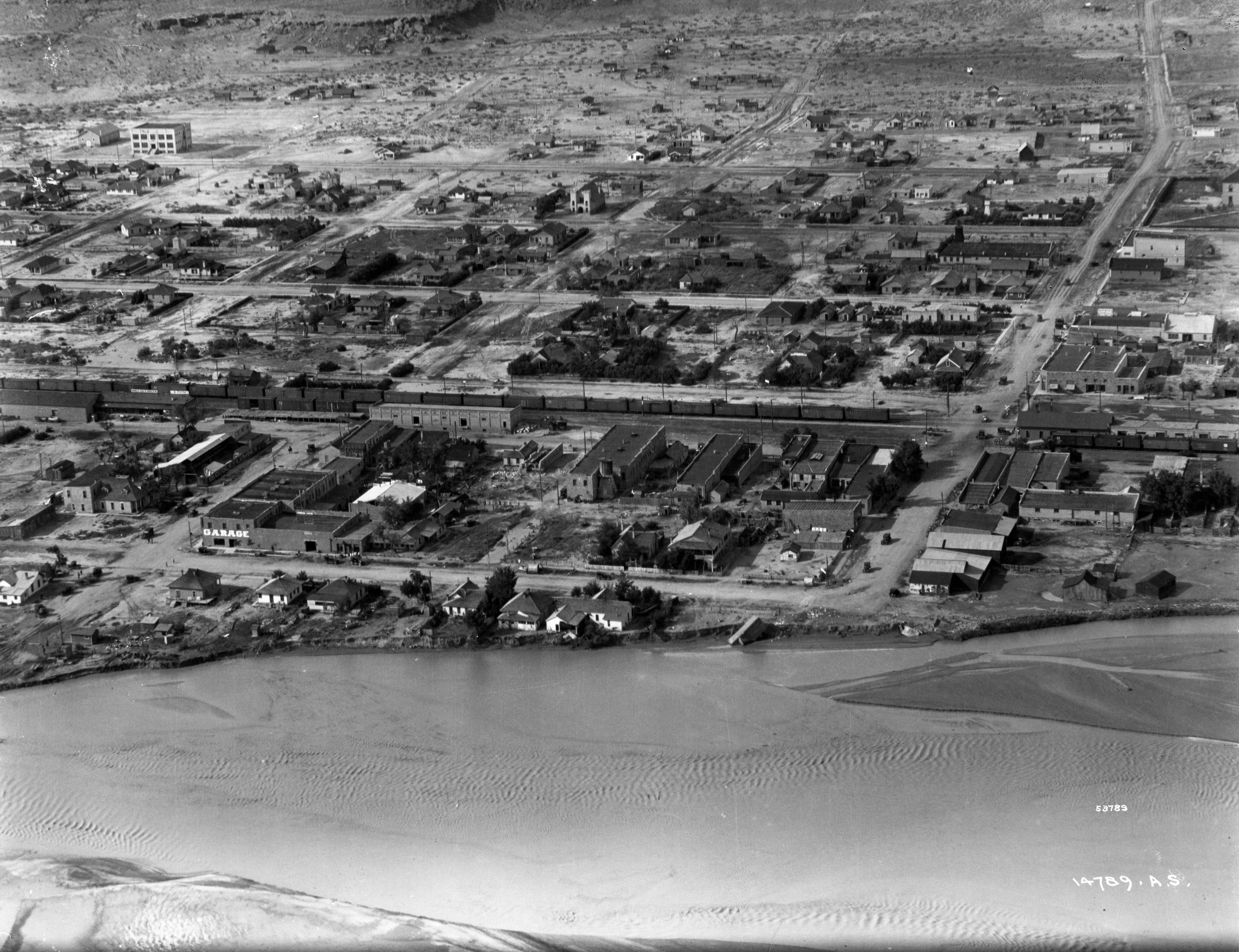
Downtown Holbrook, 1940s

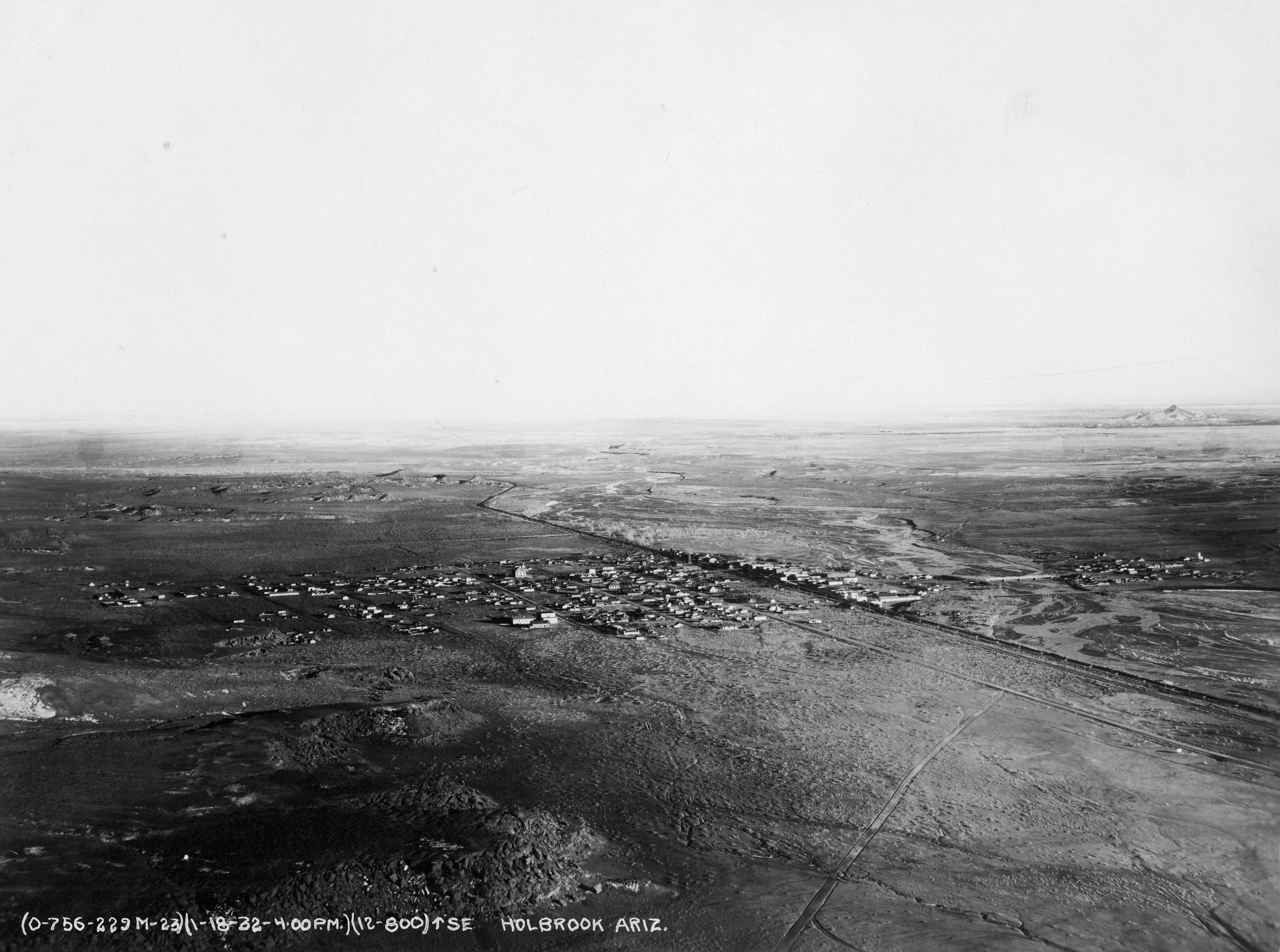
View of Holbrook, 1940s

The Holbrook area was inhabited first by the Ancestral Puebloans, then Puebloans, then the Navajo and Apache. In 1540 Coronado searched for the Seven Cities of Cibola and camped some 60 miles (100 km) east of Holbrook. Coronado sent an expedition west to find the Colorado River, and they crossed the Little Colorado some 25 miles (40 km) east of Holbrook and found a wonderland of colors they named "El Desierto Pintada" – The Painted Desert. The expedition was then led by the Hopis to the Grand Canyon.

=== U.S. settlements ===
After the Mexican–American War ended in 1848 the area was ceded to the United States. From 1851 to 1857 the U.S. Army sent three expeditions along the 35th parallel, the third led by Lt. Beale who created a 10 feet (3 m) wide wagon road. The area was known as Navajo Springs, after a spring a dozen miles northeast of Holbrook. Soon afterwards a store and saloon were established at the confluence of the Puerco River and Little Colorado Rivers two miles east of Holbrook, and the area became known as Horsehead Crossing.

In 1876, Mormons emigrated from Utah and began settlements near Horsehead Crossing on both the Little Colorado and Rio Puerco rivers. During 1881 and 1882, railroad tracks were laid down and a railroad station was built to supply wood and water and to freight supplies south to Fort Apache. The community was then named Holbrook after the first engineer of the Atlantic and Pacific Railroad. The railroad sold a million acres to a Boston investment group which established the Aztec Land and Cattle Company, better known as the Hashknife Outfit. It leased another million acres of government land and became one of the largest cattle ranches to ever exist. Holbrook became its headquarters and quickly grew into a cow-town.

=== Wild west cow-town ===
The Hashknife Outfit hired cowboys, many of whom were wanted men hiding from arrest. Rustling of cattle and horses over two million acres plagued the Hashknife Outfit. With cowmen, sheepmen, farmers, rustlers and outlaws competing for the same land, a range war ensued, called both the Pleasant Valley War and the Tonto Basin War. It likely killed as many men as any of the western range wars. Many of the events that played out during the Pleasant Valley War up to 1887 occurred in and around Holbrook, including the famous Holbrook Shootout.

=== Holbrook shootout ===
On September 4, 1887, Commodore Perry Owens, the Apache County Sheriff, came to Holbrook to arrest Andy Blevins, a.k.a. Andy Cooper, for horse theft. Blevins had also recently bragged about killing two men and had killed many more, including two lawmen.

Sheriff Owens insisted on confronting the Blevins brothers alone, knowing there would likely be a shootout. He went to the Blevins' house, which still stands, knocked on the door, and when Blevins asked what he wanted, announced he'd come to arrest him. Blevins resisted arrest and a shootout occurred. Blevins, two brothers, a friend, and Blevins' horse were shot; all died, except one brother.

Owens emerged unscathed, despite being shot at from a half-dozen feet (2 m) away. Owens single-handedly taking on four men made him a western legend rivaling the Earp Brothers and Texas John Slaughter as lawmen of the Old West.

=== Later development ===
Holbrook was known as "the town too tough for women and churches" and in 1914 was said to be the only county seat in the U.S. that didn't have a church (the Mormons had moved 25 miles (40 km) south to Snowflake and Taylor). The original railroad station was replaced by the Santa Fe Depot in 1892.

Navajo County was divided off of Apache County in 1895 and Holbrook became the county seat. Many lawmen and cowboys from the area became Rough Riders with Theodore Roosevelt in the late 1800s. But by 1902, The Hashknife Outfit was bankrupt and the land was sold to the Babbitt brothers.

President Theodore Roosevelt named the Petrified Forest (including part of the Painted Desert) a National Monument in 1906. Holbrook was incorporated in 1917. Most of the Beale Wagon Road became Route 66 in 1926 and passed through both the Petrified Forest and Holbrook. Tourism started taking over the economy.

=== Holbrook meteorite ===
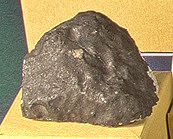
Fragment of the "Holbrook Meteorite"

Arizona is famous for its huge Meteor Crater, but Holbrook also witnessed its own small meteor event. In the evening of July 19, 1912, a smoke trail appeared in the sky and soon after, at 7:15 p.m., a meteorite with an estimated mass of 190 kilograms (419 pounds) exploded high in the atmosphere.

An estimated 16,000 or more minor fragments rained down over Navajo County in an area approximately 6 miles (10 km) east of Holbrook. The primary explosion was heard at least 40 miles (60 km) away, and one of the witnesses in Holbrook, then 17-year-old Pauline McCleve, described the event as the loudest sound she ever heard. The largest piece of the Holbrook Meteorite that has been recovered was found shortly after. It weighs 14.5 pounds (6.6 kg) and resides at Arizona State University in Tempe.

The Holbrook meteorite was found to be of the chondrite (stony) type.

== Geography ==
According to the United States Census Bureau, the city has a total area of 15.4 square miles (40 km^{2}), all land.

=== Climate ===
Holbrook has a cold desert climate (BWk) with cold to cool winters and hot summers. Although the mean snowfall is 0.16 metres (6.30 in), the median is zero, so the majority of winters do not have measurable snow. There are high diurnal temperature variations year-round.

Climate data for Holbrook, Arizona (1991–2020 normals, extremes 1893–2010)
Month	Jan	Feb	Mar	Apr	May	Jun	Jul	Aug	Sep	Oct	Nov	Dec	Year
Record high °F (°C)	74 (23)	87 (31)	89 (32)	93 (34)	101 (38)	108 (42)	110 (43)	105 (41)	106 (41)	95 (35)	89 (32)	78 (26)	110 (43)
Mean maximum °F (°C)	63.8 (17.7)	69.6 (20.9)	77.3 (25.2)	84.0 (28.9)	92.3 (33.5)	99.4 (37.4)	102.2 (39.0)	98.5 (36.9)	93.5 (34.2)	85.6 (29.8)	75.1 (23.9)	65.0 (18.3)	102.8 (39.3)
Mean daily maximum °F (°C)	51.3 (10.7)	57.1 (13.9)	65.2 (18.4)	72.1 (22.3)	81.4 (27.4)	91.5 (33.1)	94.1 (34.5)	91.0 (32.8)	85.6 (29.8)	74.8 (23.8)	61.1 (16.2)	49.8 (9.9)	72.9 (22.7)
Daily mean °F (°C)	36.5 (2.5)	41.0 (5.0)	47.9 (8.8)	54.7 (12.6)	63.6 (17.6)	73.2 (22.9)	78.3 (25.7)	76.2 (24.6)	69.6 (20.9)	57.7 (14.3)	44.9 (7.2)	35.6 (2.0)	56.6 (13.7)
Mean daily minimum °F (°C)	21.7 (−5.7)	24.8 (−4.0)	30.6 (−0.8)	37.4 (3.0)	45.8 (7.7)	54.9 (12.7)	62.4 (16.9)	61.4 (16.3)	53.7 (12.1)	40.7 (4.8)	28.7 (−1.8)	21.5 (−5.8)	40.3 (4.6)
Mean minimum °F (°C)	10.6 (−11.9)	13.2 (−10.4)	17.9 (−7.8)	25.9 (−3.4)	34.0 (1.1)	44.0 (6.7)	53.7 (12.1)	54.9 (12.7)	41.9 (5.5)	26.8 (−2.9)	15.9 (−8.9)	8.7 (−12.9)	5.9 (−14.5)
Record low °F (°C)	−20 (−29)	−9 (−23)	2 (−17)	10 (−12)	13 (−11)	30 (−1)	41 (5)	36 (2)	27 (−3)	15 (−9)	−10 (−23)	−21 (−29)	−21 (−29)
Average precipitation inches (mm)	0.73 (19)	0.35 (8.9)	0.52 (13)	0.26 (6.6)	0.29 (7.4)	0.25 (6.4)	1.05 (27)	1.71 (43)	1.13 (29)	0.90 (23)	0.50 (13)	0.44 (11)	8.13 (207)
Average snowfall inches (cm)	0.5 (1.3)	0.5 (1.3)	0.6 (1.5)	0.5 (1.3)	0.0 (0.0)	0.0 (0.0)	0.0 (0.0)	0.0 (0.0)	0.0 (0.0)	0.0 (0.0)	0.6 (1.5)	0.6 (1.5)	3.3 (8.4)
Average precipitation days (≥ 0.1 inch)	3.9	3.5	4.2	2.2	2.4	1.7	5.3	7.4	4.6	3.3	2.7	4.2	45.4
Average snowy days (≥ 0.1 inch)	0.4	0.4	0.4	0.1	0.0	0.0	0.0	0.0	0.0	0.0	0.4	0.5	2.2
Source 1: NOAA
Source 2: National Weather Service

== Demographics ==
Historical population
Census	Pop.	Note	%±
1890	206		—
1910	609		—
1920	1,206		98.0%
1930	1,115		−7.5%
1940	1,184		6.2%
1950	2,336		97.3%
1960	3,438		47.2%
1970	4,759		38.4%
1980	5,785		21.6%
1990	4,686		−19.0%
2000	4,917		4.9%
2010	5,053		2.8%
2020	4,858		−3.9%
U.S. Decennial Census

=== Racial and ethnic composition ===
Holbrook city, Arizona – Racial composition Note: the US Census treats Hispanic/Latino as an ethnic category. This table excludes Latinos from the racial categories and assigns them to a separate category. Hispanics/Latinos may be of any race.
Race (NH = Non-Hispanic)	2020	2010	2000	1990	1980
White alone (NH)	36.7% (1,782)	43.9% (2,218)	48.1% (2,364)	54.5% (2,552)	58.9% (3,405)
Black alone (NH)	1.8% (87)	2.4% (122)	2.1% (103)	2.9% (134)	3.4% (199)
American Indian alone (NH)	30.9% (1,501)	24.2% (1,221)	22.7% (1,118)	18.7% (878)	16.2% (937)
Asian alone (NH)	0.7% (33)	1.2% (62)	1% (50)	1% (48)	0.6% (33)
Pacific Islander alone (NH)	0.2% (8)	0% (2)	0% (0)		
Other race alone (NH)	0.4% (18)	0.1% (4)	0.1% (4)	0.2% (9)	0.6% (36)
Multiracial (NH)	4.4% (216)	2.8% (143)	2.6% (130)	—	—
Hispanic/Latino (any race)	25% (1,213)	25.4% (1,281)	23.3% (1,148)	22.7% (1,065)	20.3% (1,175)

=== 2020 census ===
As of the 2020 census, Holbrook had a population of 4,858. The median age was 36.1 years. 25.7% of residents were under the age of 18 and 14.7% of residents were 65 years of age or older. For every 100 females there were 101.9 males, and for every 100 females age 18 and over there were 100.7 males age 18 and over.

0.0% of residents lived in urban areas, while 100.0% lived in rural areas.

There were 1,695 households in Holbrook, of which 34.9% had children under the age of 18 living in them. Of all households, 35.9% were married-couple households, 23.4% were households with a male householder and no spouse or partner present, and 31.7% were households with a female householder and no spouse or partner present. About 30.7% of all households were made up of individuals and 11.8% had someone living alone who was 65 years of age or older.

There were 1,943 housing units, of which 12.8% were vacant. The homeowner vacancy rate was 1.1% and the rental vacancy rate was 10.4%.

The most reported ancestries in 2020 were Navajo (29.7%), Mexican (18.8%), English (13.1%), German (7.9%), Irish (6.9%), and African American (2%).

=== 2000 census ===
As of the census of 2000, there were 4,917 people, 1,626 households, and 1,195 families residing in the city. The population density was 318.4 inhabitants per square mile (122.9/km^{2}). There were 1,906 housing units at an average density of 123.4 per square mile (47.6/km^{2}). The racial makeup of the city was 59.3% White, 24.0% Native American, 2.4% Black or African American, 1.0% Asian, 8.4% from other races, and 4.9% from two or more races. 23.4% of the population were Hispanic or Latino of any race.

There were 1,626 households, out of which 40.7% had children under the age of 18 living with them, 52.3% were married couples living together, 16.4% had a female householder with no husband present, and 26.5% were non-families. Of all households 22.6% were made up of individuals, and 6.8% had someone living alone who was 65 years of age or older. The average household size was 2.93 and the average family size was 3.47.

In the city, the population was spread out, with 35.7% under the age of 18, 9.3% from 18 to 24, 26.5% from 25 to 44, 19.8% from 45 to 64, and 8.7% who were 65 years of age or older. The median age was 30 years. For every 100 females, there were 90.2 males. For every 100 females age 18 and over, there were 87.7 males.

The median income for a household in the city was $31,746, and the median income for a family was $36,349. Males had a median income of $30,797 versus $24,088 for females. The per capita income for the city was $13,912. About 16.6% of families and 20.1% of the population were below the poverty line, including 25.7% of those under age 18 and 3.2% of those age 65 or over.

== Points of interest ==
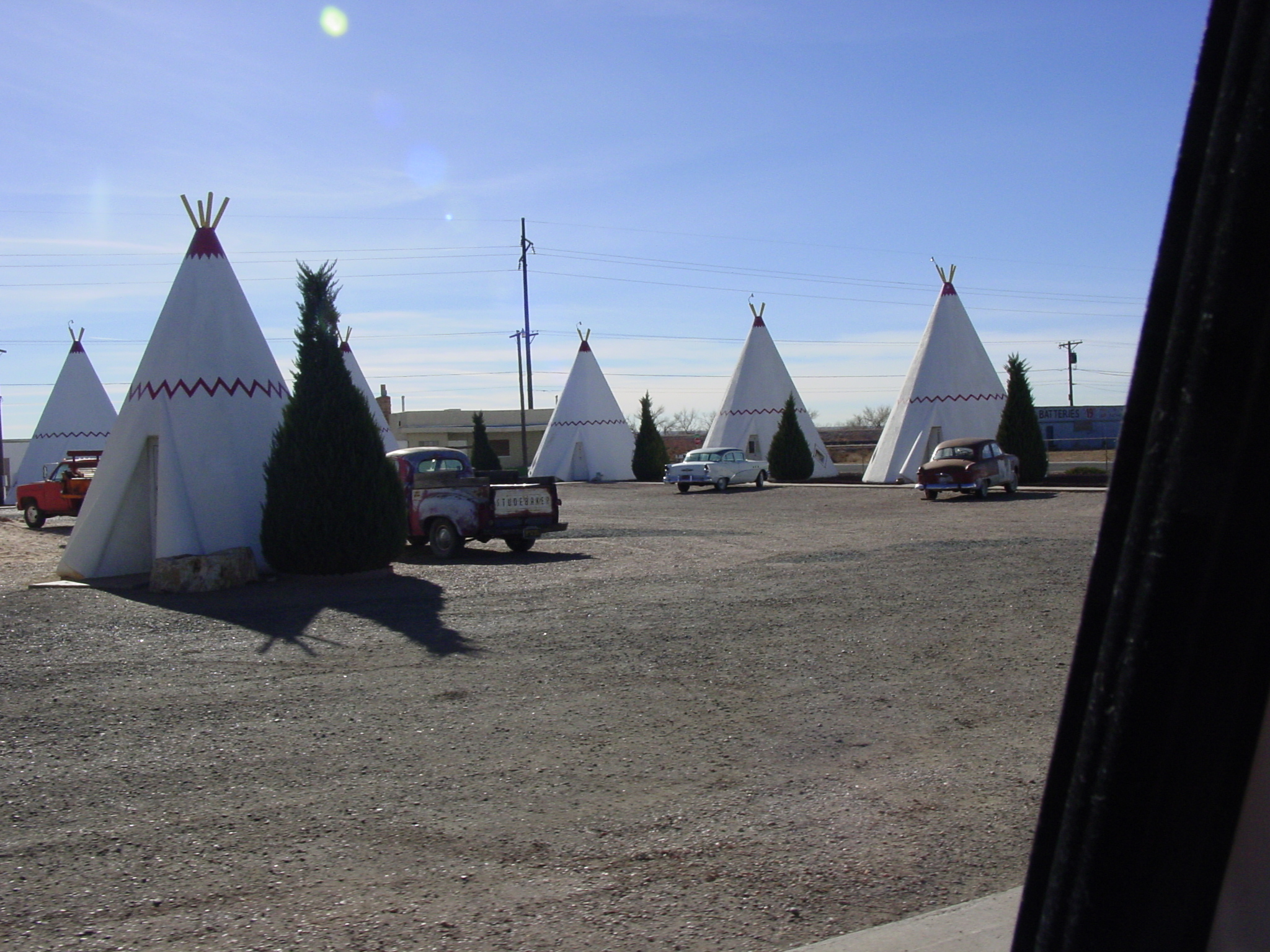
At the Wigwam Motel along U.S. Route 66, visitors can sleep in a teepee.

- Petrified Forest National Park is located 28 miles (45 km) east of Holbrook, the nearest city to the park.
- The Navajo County Courthouse in downtown Holbrook was built in 1898. It is now used by the Navajo County Historical Society and is listed on the National Register of Historic Places.
- Wigwam Motel on Hopi Drive. Built in 1950, it is listed in the National Register of Historic Places as Wigwam Village #6.
- Historic U.S. Route 66 runs through Holbrook.
- Bucket of Blood Street was ranked 6th in "wackiest street names", according to a 2006 poll by Car Connection website.
- Arizona Rancho, in or near Holbrook, is NRHP-listed
- Sidney Sapp House, 215 W. Hopi in Holbrook is NRHP-listed
- South Central Avenue Commercial Historic District in Holbrook is NRHP-listed
- Several historic bridges near Holbrook are also NRHP-listed

== Education ==
Primary and secondary schools

The city is served by the Holbrook Unified School District and serves 2324 students.

Three elementary schools: Park Elementary School (K–2) and Hulet Elementary School (3–5) serve the city and Indian Wells Elementary (K–6) serves the northern parts of the school district.

Holbrook Junior High School (6–8) and Holbrook High School (9–12) serve the city.

A portion of Holbrook's land is in the Joseph City Unified School District.

Colleges and universities

One of the four main campuses of Northland Pioneer College community college is located in Holbrook. The other three main campuses are in Show Low, Snowflake, and Winslow, all in Navajo County, Arizona.

Public libraries

The Holbrook Public Library is located in Holbrook.

== Transportation ==
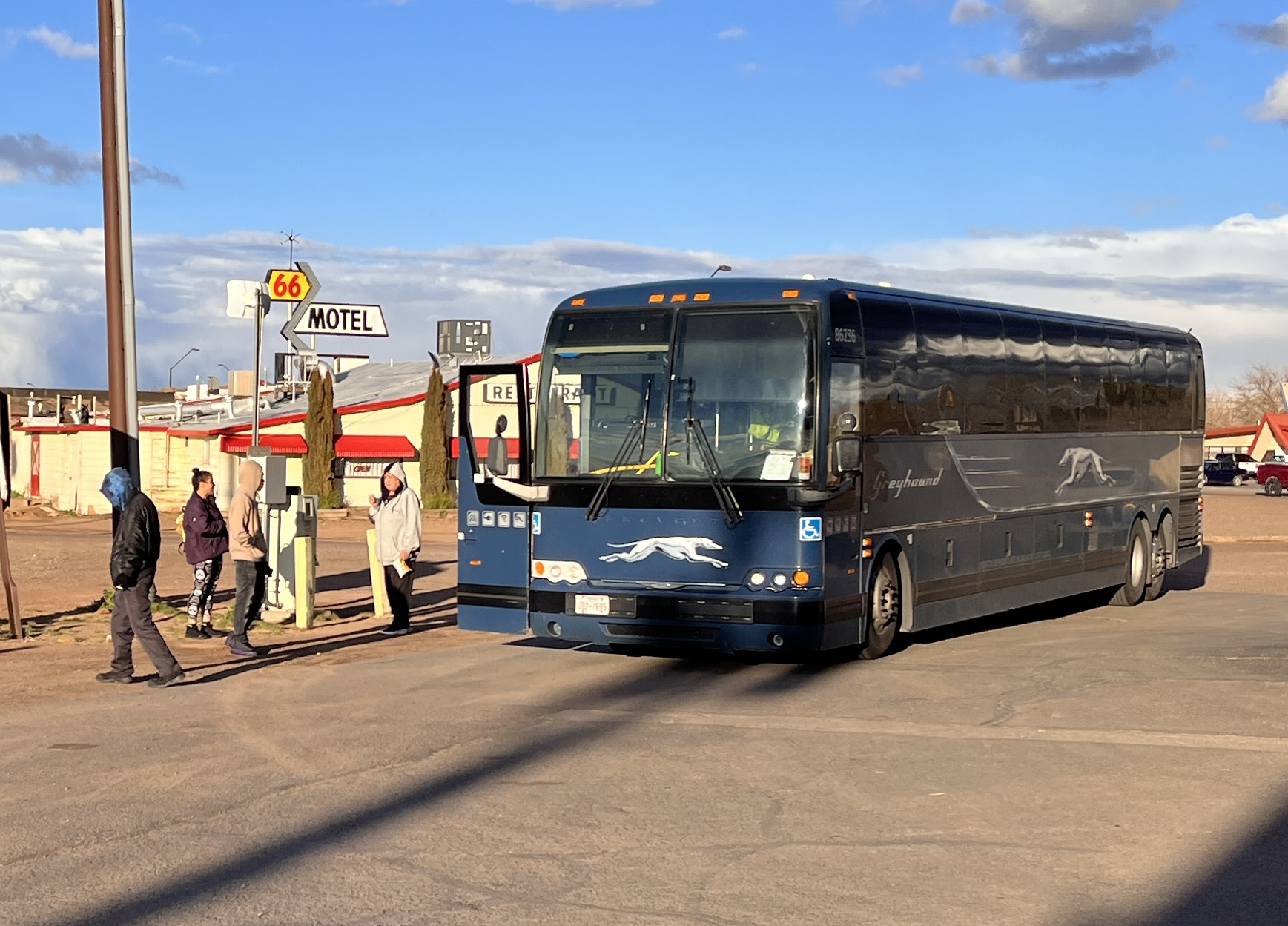
A Greyhound bus in Holbrook destined for St. Louis, Missouri

Greyhound Lines serves Holbrook on its Los Angeles-New York line. White Mountain Connection, operated by the City of Show Low connects Holbrook with Show Low.

Holbrook is a junction between Interstate 40, U.S. Route 180, and Arizona State Route 77. Arizona State Route 377 meets Arizona State Route 77 at the southern edge of Holbrook.

== Notable people ==
- Mike Budenholzer, former head coach of the Phoenix Suns
- Chester Crandell, politician
- Gene Evans, actor
- Eric B. Shumway, president of Brigham Young University–Hawaii
- Aaron Yazzie, mechanical engineer at NASA's Jet Propulsion Laboratory

== Nearest cities and towns ==
- Heber-Overgaard
- Joseph City
- Snowflake
- Sun Valley
- Winslow
- Woodruff

== See also ==
- Aztec Land & Cattle Company
