= Bucket of Blood Street =

Street in Holbrook, Arizona

Coordinates: 34°53′59″N 110°9′25″W

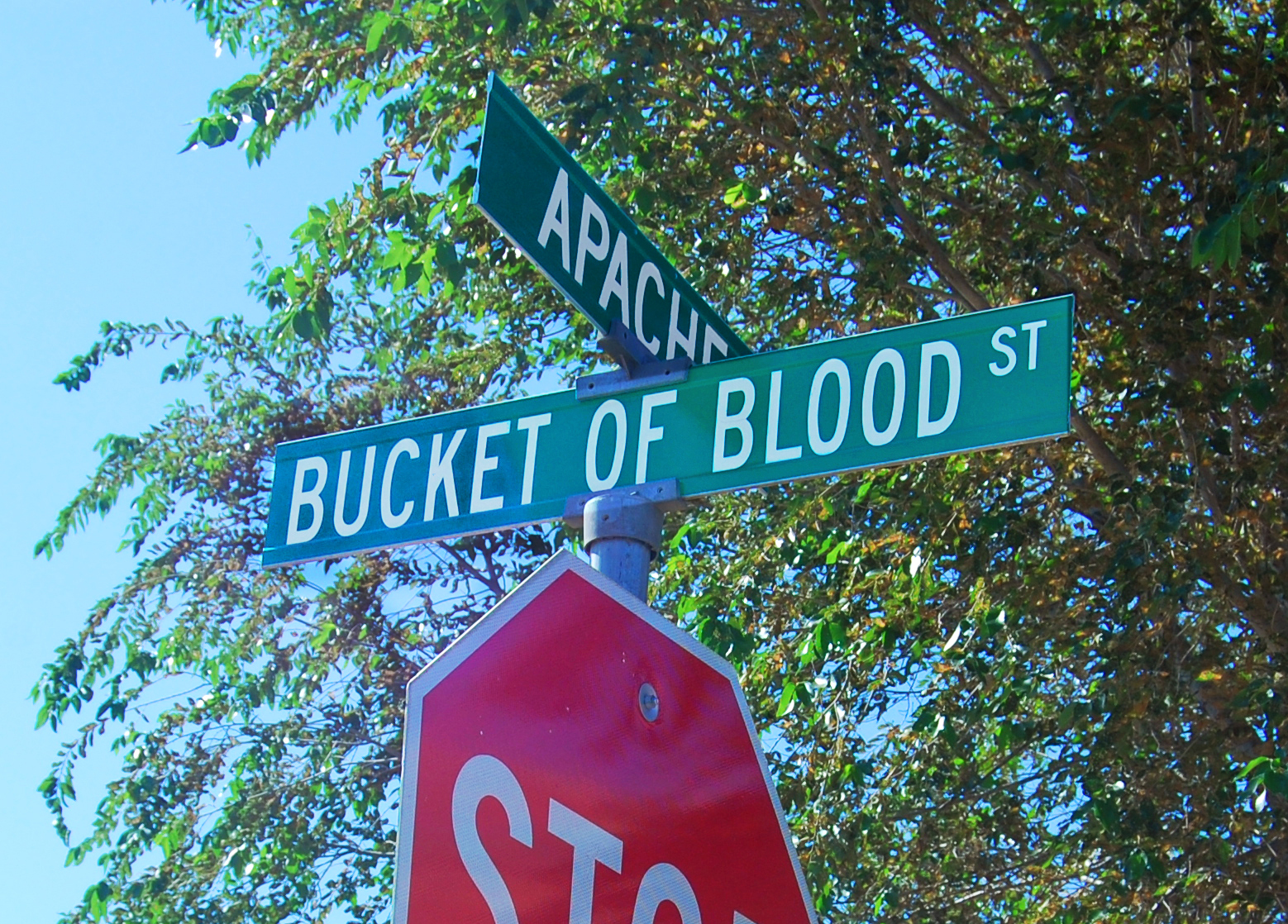
Bucket of Blood Street and Apache Road, Holbrook, Arizona

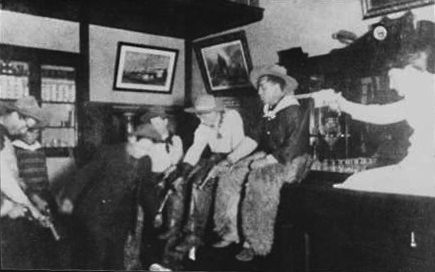
Interior of the Bucket of Blood Saloon, circa 1890

Bucket of Blood Street is located off the former U.S. Route 66 in the Old Downtown district of Holbrook, Arizona. Bucket of Blood Street is one block south of the historical Santa Fe Railroad station on Navajo Road that was built in 1882.

Holbrook was founded in the 1880s as a railroad stop. At the time, the desert town was mainly populated by ranchers, outlaws, cowboys and cattle rustlers, and was known for its gun fights. Holbrook had a reputation as a "town too tough for women and churches".

== History ==
Terrell's Cottage Saloon had existed on the street for years before becoming known as Bucket of Blood Saloon, after two men died in a violent fight there. The saloon was popular with cowboys and ruffians; fistfights and gunfights often broke out there.

The year 1886 was a particularly violent one, as the town lost about ten percent of its population. A fight broke out at the saloon during a card game between rival cattle rustlers, including wranglers from the Hashknife Outfit of the Aztec Land and Cattle Company. The result of the fight was described as though a bucket of blood had been spilled on the floor.

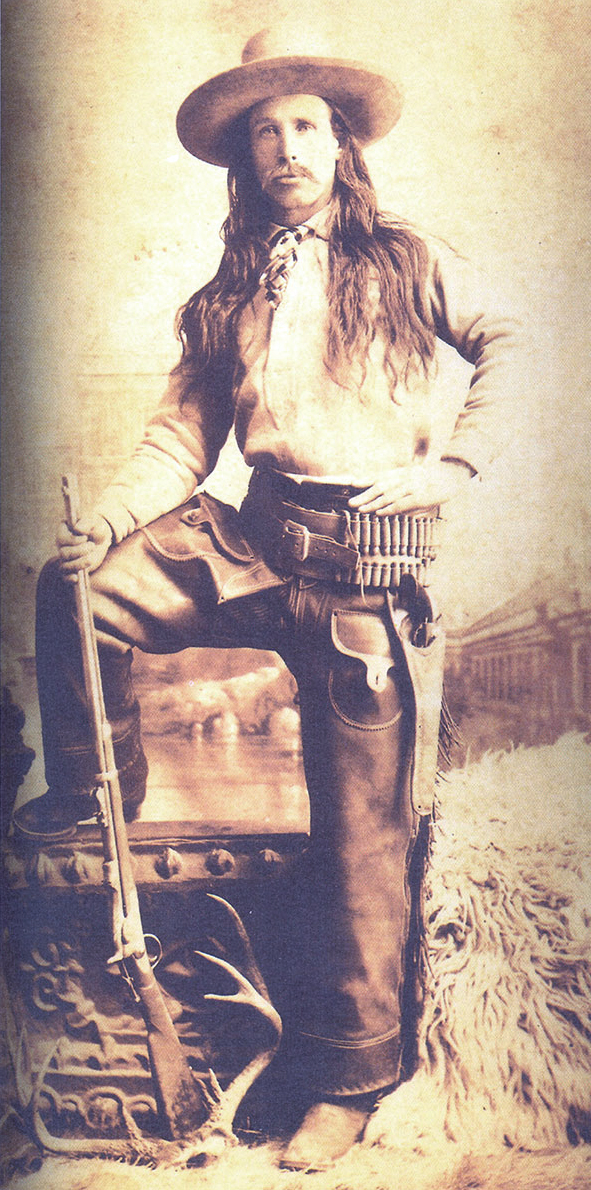
Navajo County sheriff, Commodore Perry Owens

A newspaper account describes another event on January 19, 1896, when the proprietor of the saloon shot and killed two men playing cards: "Suddenly a dispute arose and angry words passed between them." The manager of the saloon, Harry Donnelly, used a revolver to force another man, George C. Hiatt, a barber, into the street and shot him "through the heart" in front of the town drug store. Donnelly was arrested by Deputy Sheriff Hofford who was acting as the county sheriff, as Commodore Perry Owens was out of town at the time. The newspaper report claims that when the widow Hiatt heard the news she fell "lifeless to the floor". The saloon was owned at the time by F. J. Wattron, however Donnelly managed it.

Albert F. Potter's memoir, written around 1888, describes the events leading to the name Bucket of Blood somewhat differently. He wrote of participating in a "roundup on the Little Colorado River range ... 12 miles east of Holbrook." At sunrise two horsemen were seen riding towards his party from the direction of Holbrook. One man shouted, "Here we come! All shot to pieces." The head of the other man was wrapped in bloody bandages covering a serious wound. Potter went on to write: "We recognized them as Joe Crawford, a cowboy who had worked for the Aztec Land and Cattle Company known as the Hashknife Outfit, and George Bell, a gambler. Crawford was so weak [from his wounds] that he had to be lifted from the horse he was riding. We laid him on the horse wrangler's bed and with a handful of flour from the cook's bread pan I plastered the wound on his head and stopped the bleeding. Examination showed that a bullet had also passed through the cuff of his shirt and coat sleeve, and just grazed the side of his body. Scars of other old wounds showed that this was not Crawford's first fight."

Potter then describes Bell's involvement in an incident during a card game with a man named Ramon Lopez, during which Lopez struck Crawford in the head with his six-shooter gun. Crawford retaliated by drawing his gun and killing Lopez. Shooting then broke out in the saloon, and Crawford killed another man, after which "Crawford and Bell then made their getaway". Potter went on to write that he believed Joe Crawford "was in fact Grat Dalton, a member of the notorious Dalton Gang of outlaws who was later killed during an attempted bank robbery at Coffeyville, Kansas". Potter concluded that this was the backstory to the naming of Bucket of Blood Saloon.

George W. Hennessey was the manager (not owner) of Bucket of Blood Saloon for about a year, circa 1908. He had been a member of the Hashknife Outfit.

In 1913, a newspaper reported that a church was finally to be built in Holbrook; however, it was reported that the proprietor of the Bucket of Blood Saloon considered this the "end of an era" and cancelled his subscription to the newspaper in "disgust". It had until that time been the only county seat in the United States without a church.

== Bucket of Blood Saloon building ==
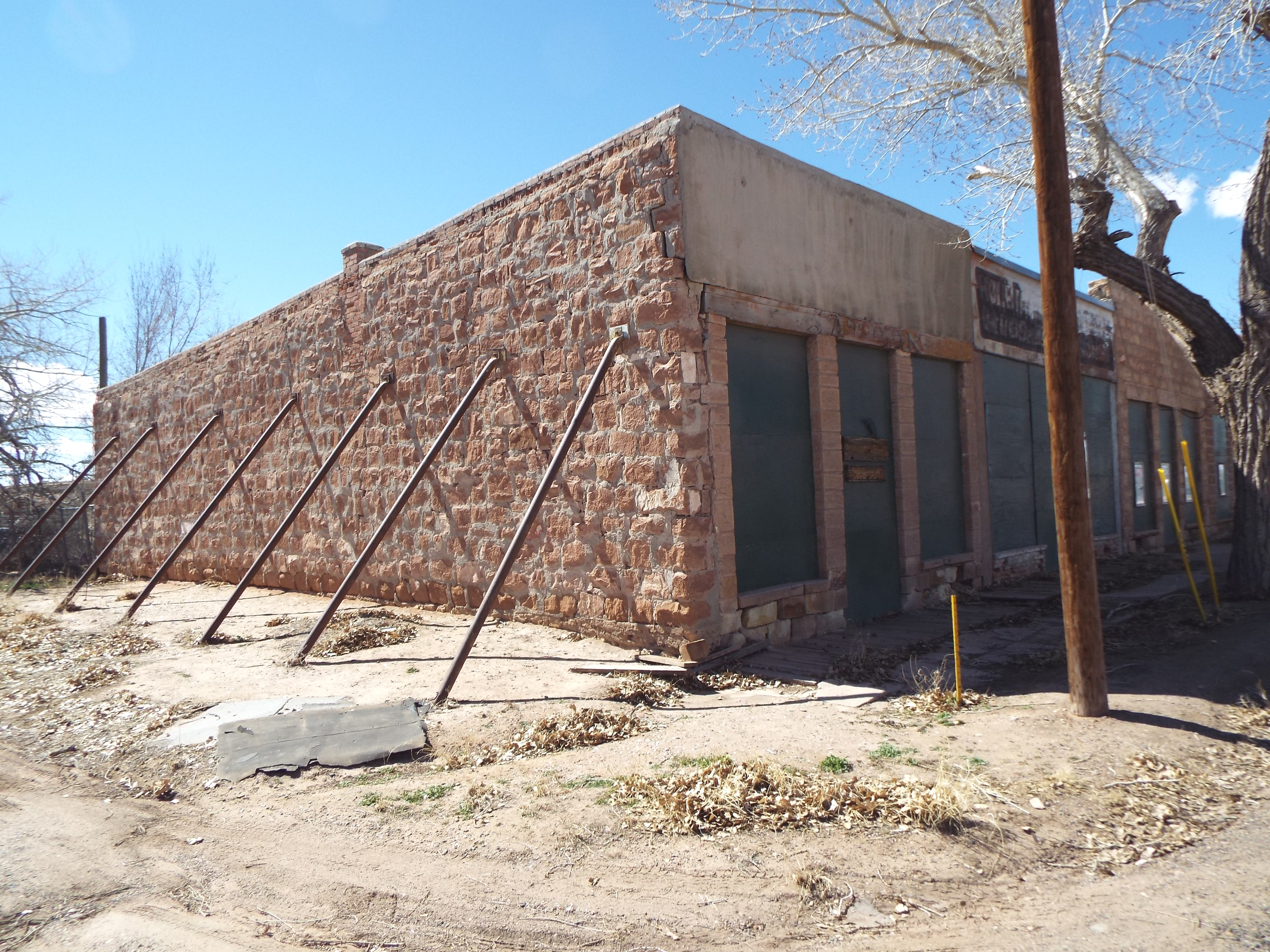
Bucket of Blood Saloon, South Central Avenue Commercial Historic District, built in 1888

The Bucket of Blood Saloon building is located on Bucket of Blood Street in the eastern parcel of the Henning Block of the South Central Avenue Commercial Historic District, which is on the National Register of Historic Places.

The building is 60 feet (18 m) long; the façade features a central entryway. Beneath wooden protective panels are glazed entrance doors with a transom window above, and four large windows on either side of the doorway. The building was constructed from dressed sandstone and rusticated sandstone blocks. The parapet wall was stuccoed, and the other original walls were adobe. Only a short section of the adobe walls remains intact. The roof is constructed of corrugated tin. The interior floor and the ceiling are constructed of tongue-and-groove wood strips.

For a time the Bucket of Blood Saloon served as the town hall, general community center, court and a social gathering place. By 1977, the Navajo Community College was using the saloon building as a warehouse.

== Gallery ==
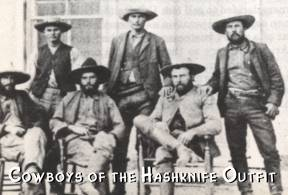
Hashknife Outfit cowboys outside the Bucket of Blood Saloon, circa 1890

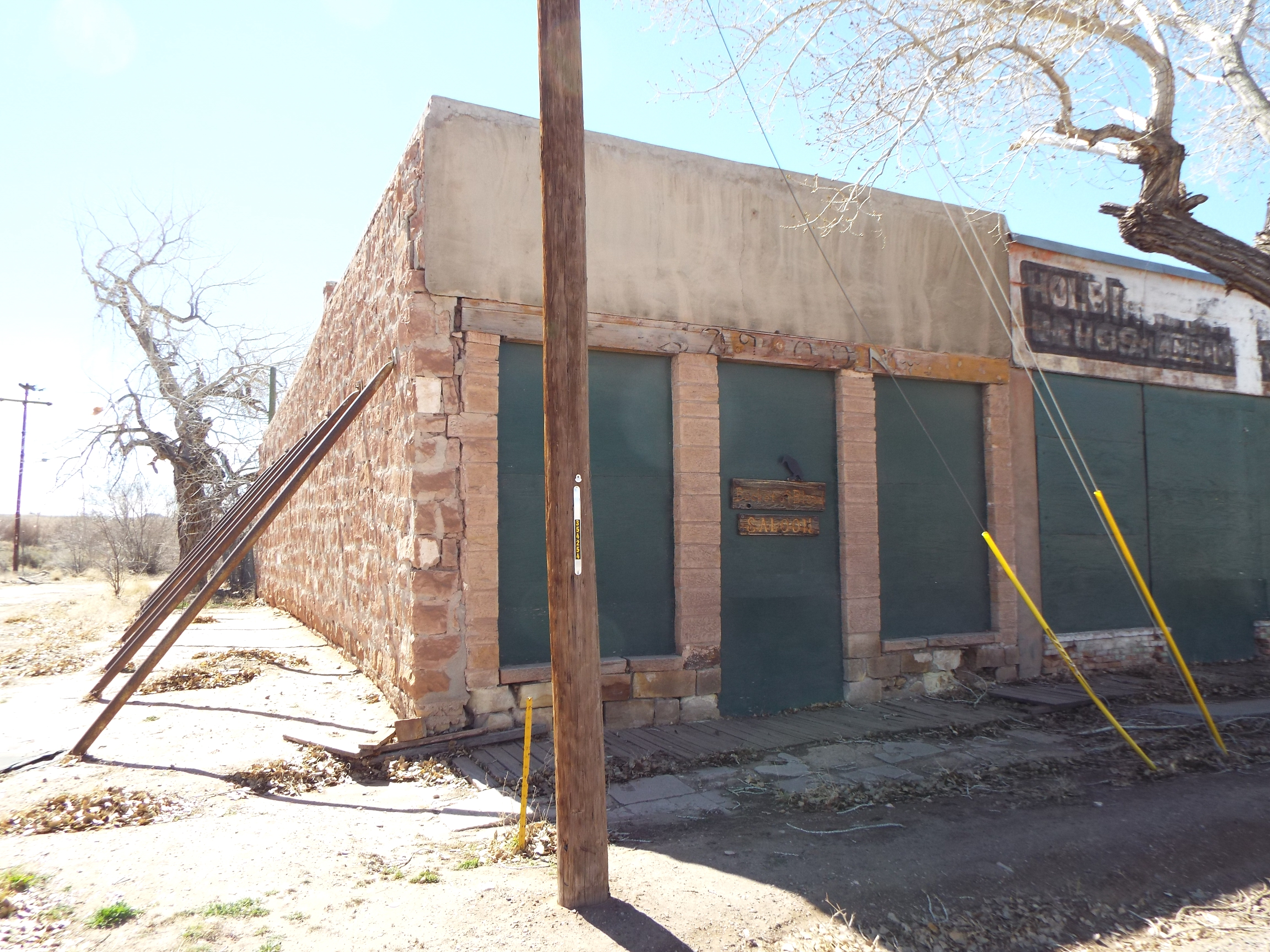
Bucket of Blood Saloon building on Bucket of Blood Street

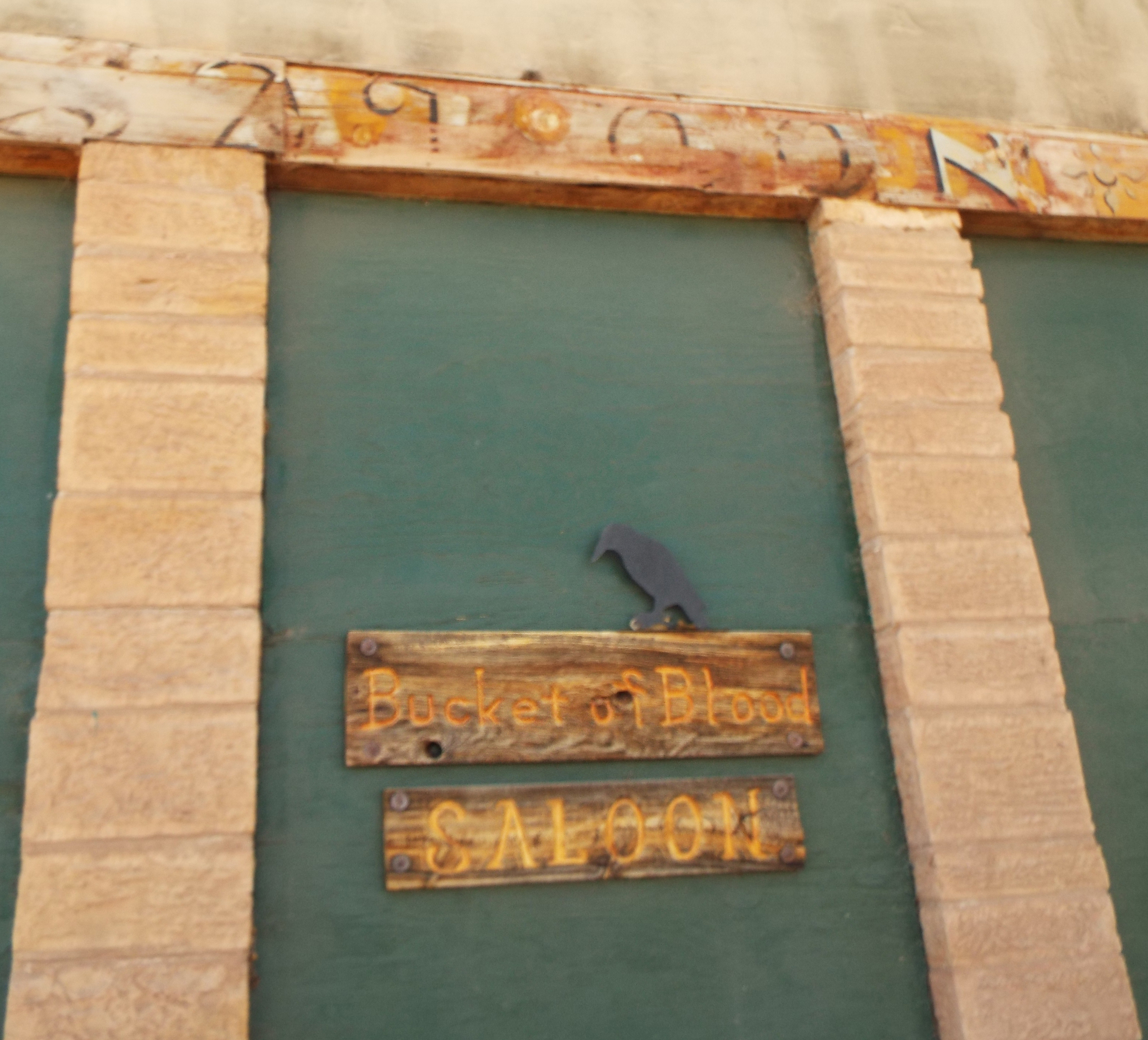
Boarded up Bucket of Blood Saloon with sign

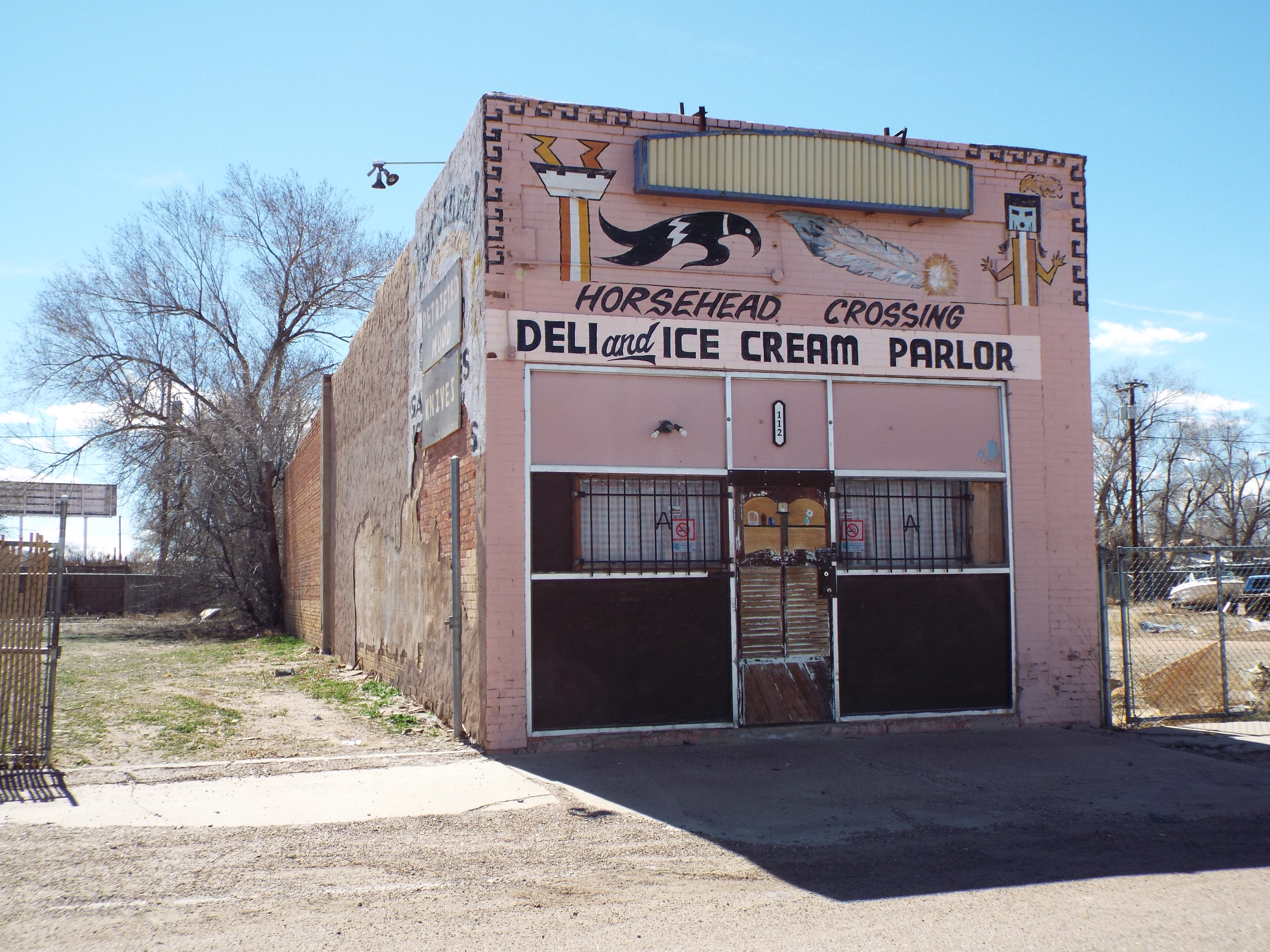
Horsehead Crossing Deli and Ice Cream Parlor at 112 Bucket of Blood Street

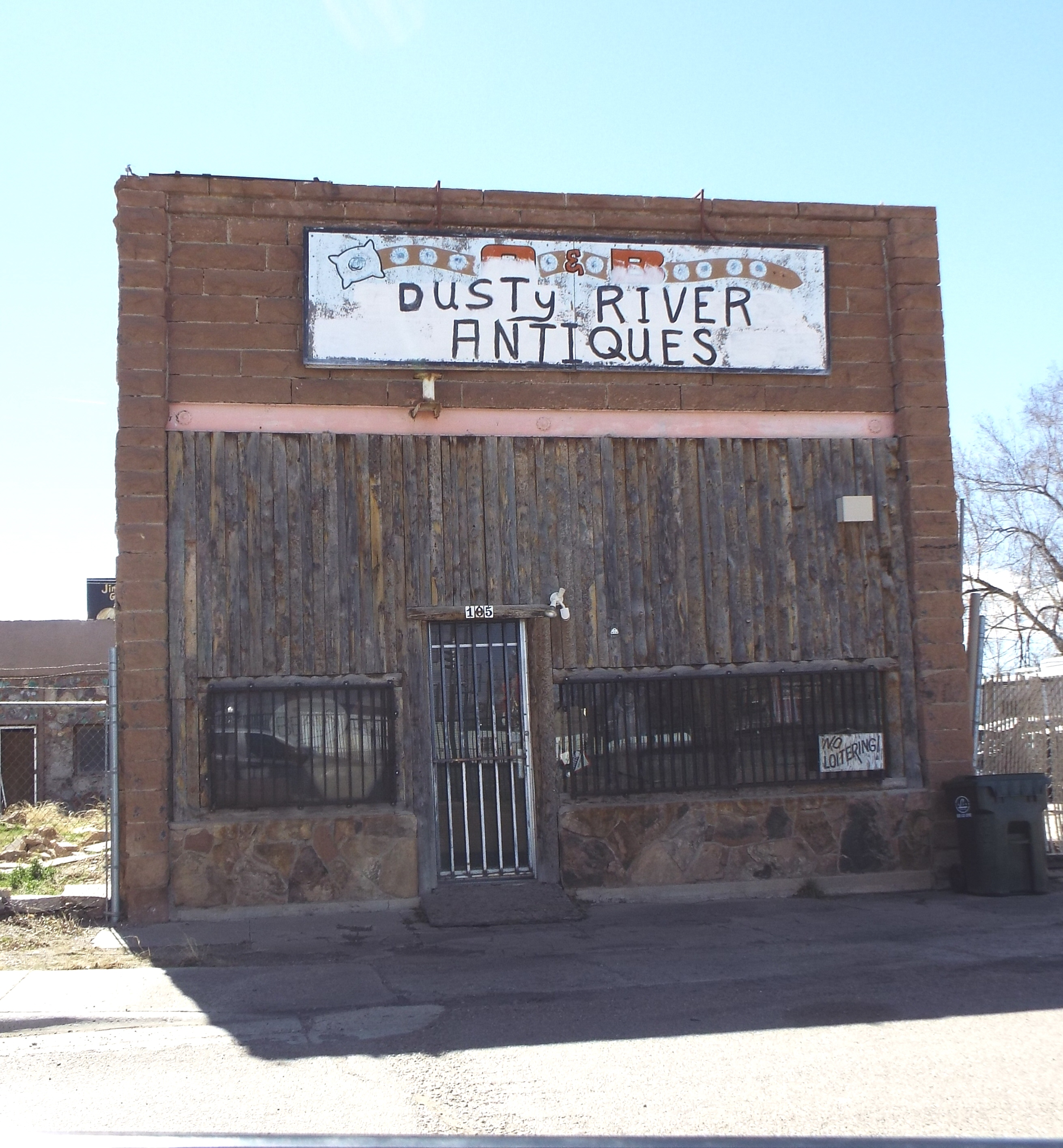
Dusty River Antiques and Grocery, 105 Bucket of Blood Street

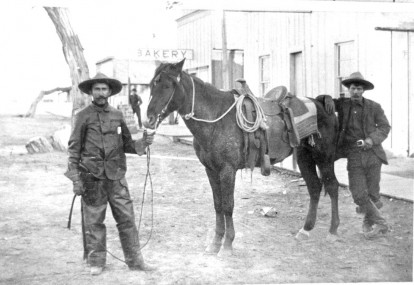
Hashknife cowboys, Holbrook, Arizona, circa 1900

== See also ==
- National Register of Historic Places listings in Navajo County, Arizona
