= Wigwam Motel =

- Wigwam Village #6
- U.S. National Register of Historic Places
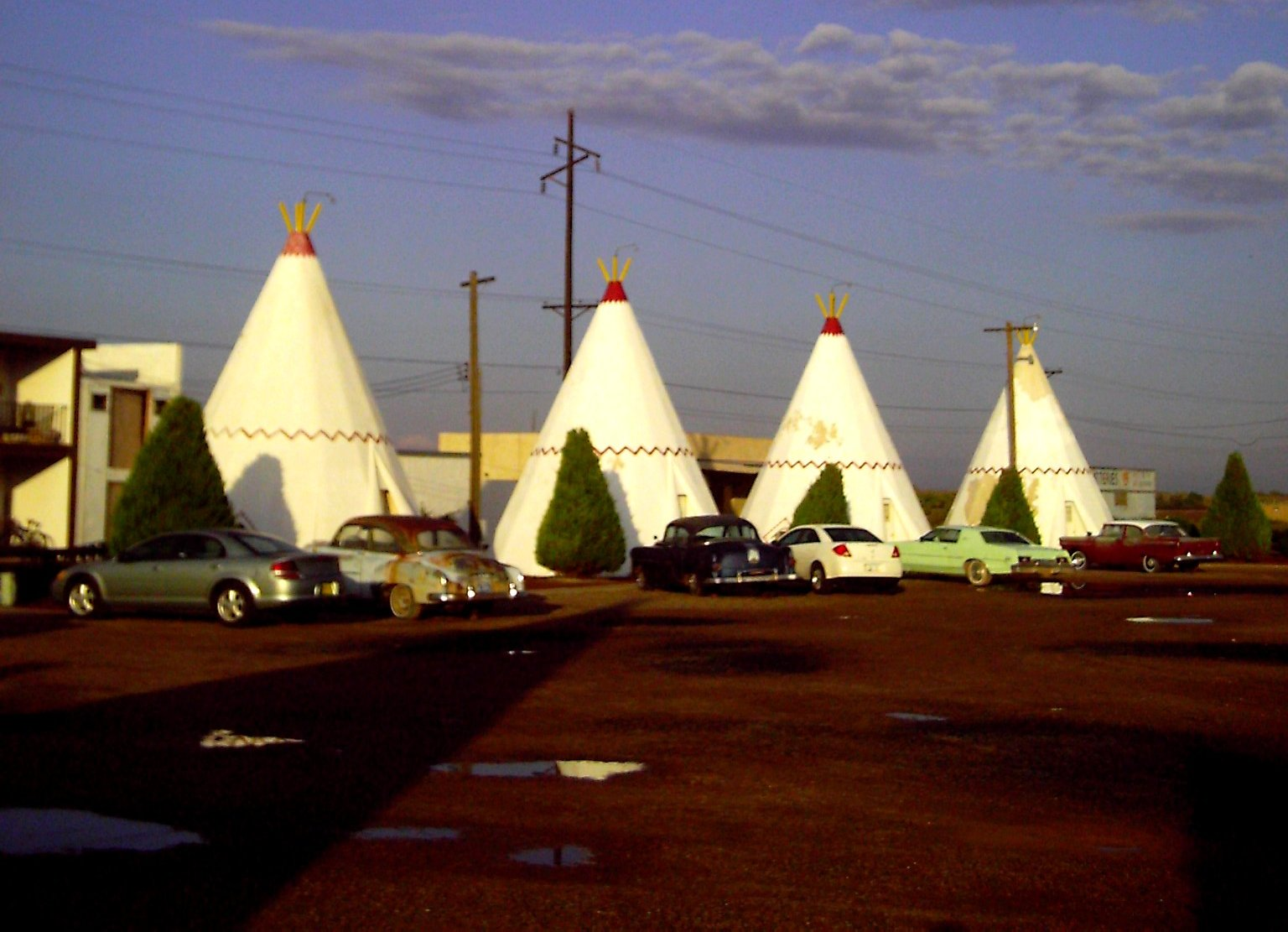
- Wigwam Motel

- Location within Arizona Location within the United States
- Location: 811 W. Hopi Dr., Holbrook, Arizona 86025
- Coordinates: 34°54′8.05″N 110°10′5.76″W
- Built: 1950
- Architect: Frank Redford, Chester Evert Lewis
- MPS: Historic US Route 66 in Arizona MPS
- NRHP reference No.: 02000419
- Added to NRHP: May 2, 2002

The Wigwam Motels, also known as the "Wigwam Villages", is a motel chain in the United States built during the 1930s and 1940s. The rooms are built in the form of tipis, mistakenly referred to as wigwams. It originally had seven different locations: two locations in Kentucky and one each in Alabama, Florida, Arizona, Louisiana, and California.

They are very distinctive historic landmarks. Two of the three surviving motels are located on historic U.S. Route 66: in Holbrook, Arizona, and in San Bernardino, California. All three of the surviving motels are listed on the National Register of Historic Places: the Wigwam Motel in Cave City, Kentucky, was listed in 1988 under the official designation of Wigwam Village #2; the Wigwam Motel in Arizona was listed as Wigwam Village #6 in 2002; and the Wigwam Motel in California was listed in 2012 as Wigwam Village #7.

== History ==
Frank A. Redford developed the Village after adding tipi-shaped motel units around a museum-shop he had built to house his collection of Native American artifacts. He applied for a patent on the ornamental design of the buildings on December 17, 1935, and was granted Design Patent 98,617 on February 18, 1936. The original drawing includes the swastika, at the time a symbol associated with Native Americans or often worn as a good-luck charm.

Seven Wigwam Villages were built between 1933 and 1949.

== Wigwam villages ==
=== Village #1: Horse Cave, Kentucky ===
Wigwam Village #1 in Horse Cave, Kentucky (1979)

The first Wigwam Village was built in 1933 by Frank A. Redford. It was located on the corner of US 31E and KY 218 in Horse Cave, Kentucky.

The central building and gas pumps are visible on undated postcards. Six more wigwams were built to be used as guest rooms.

Village #1 closed in 1935 when the nearby Wigwam Village #2 was opened, but operated under different names until it was eventually abandoned; it was razed in 1982.

=== Village #2: Cave City, Kentucky ===
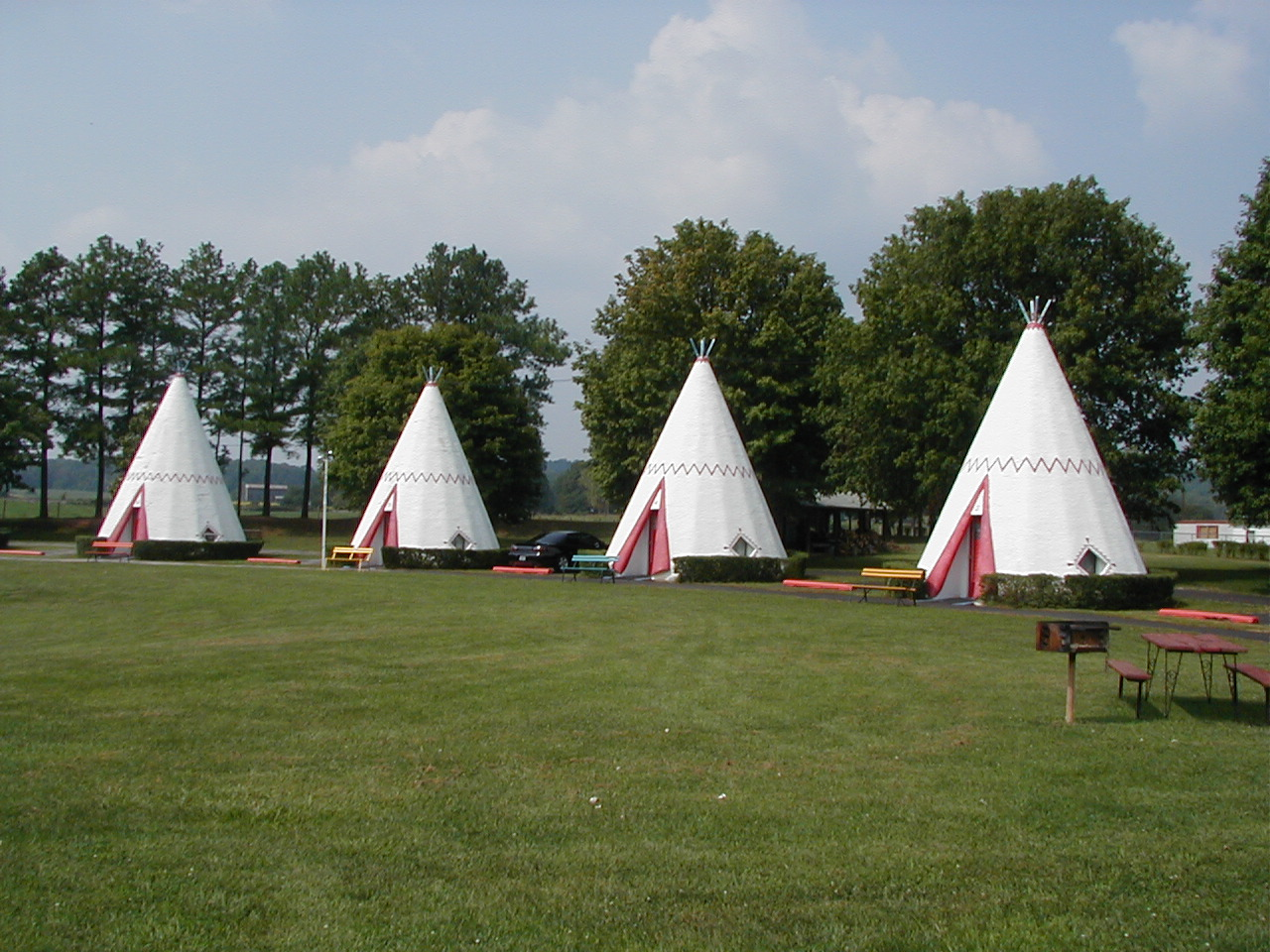
Wigwam Village#2 in Cave City, Kentucky (2000)

Wigwam Village #2 was built in 1937 on U.S. Route 31W in Cave City, Kentucky, close to Mammoth Cave National Park and a few miles south of the original Wigwam Village #1. The address is 601 North Dixie Highway, Cave City, Kentucky. ( 37°08'43.0"N, 85°56'43.8"W )

It consists of 15 wigwams used as guest rooms that are arranged in a semicircle. In the center is a much bigger concrete and steel central structure that originally served as a restaurant, plus a common area with playground, recreation space, and pavilion. Each wigwam has a paved pad to accommodate one car. The restaurant is no longer in operation, but the motel is still open.

The diameter at the base of each tipi is 14 feet (4.3 m), and they are 32 feet (9.8 m) in height. Behind the main room of each unit is a small bathroom with sink, toilet, and shower. In 2008, the rooms contain the original restored hickory furniture and a window-mounted air conditioner. There are no telephones to maintain the original atmosphere of the motel, but the rooms do have cable TV and internet access.

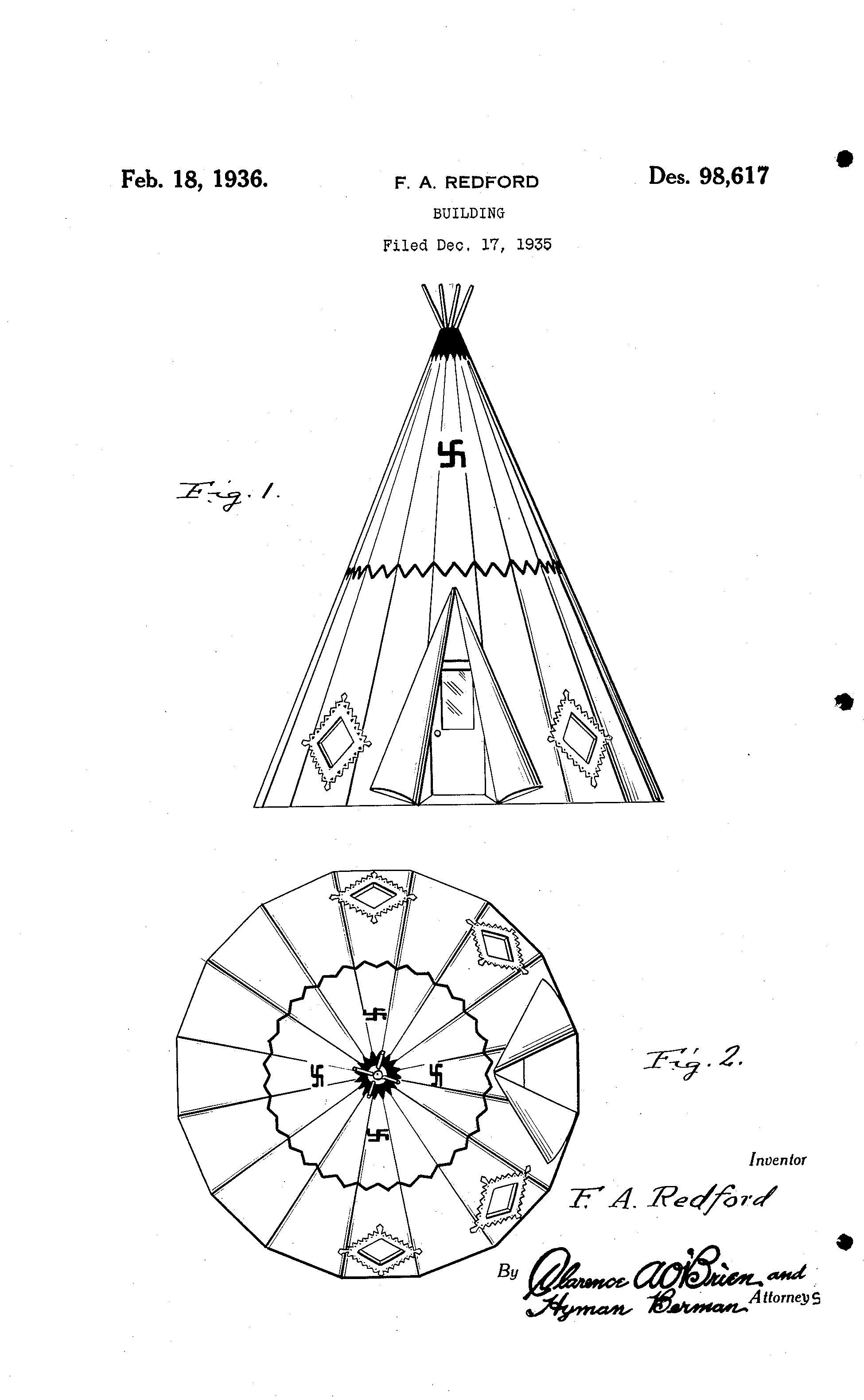
Original Drawing for Wigwam Motel in Design Patent 98,617

Wigwam Village #2 is listed in the National Register of Historic Places. It achieved this status on March 16, 1988.

=== Village #3: New Orleans, Louisiana ===
This wigwam village was built in 1940, on U.S. Route 61 in Metairie, a suburb of New Orleans, Louisiana. It included a restaurant, cocktail bar, souvenir shop, and Esso service station. Village #3 went out of business in 1954, leaving little documentation behind.

=== Village #4: Orlando, Florida ===
Wigwam Village #4 was built in 1948, and was located at 700 S. Orange Blossom Trail. The builder, Jerry Kinsley, later served as mayor of Edgewood, Florida.

This relatively large wigwam village consisted of 27 guest rooms, each in a separate wigwam constructed to resemble a horseshoe shape, with four additional wigwams, likely housing offices and a restaurant. A pool was located in the middle of the lot. Village #4 claimed to be "Orlando's largest and finest Motel."

Village #4 was razed in 1974, and replaced with a Days Inn. The only part of the original design that survived was the swimming pool. An attempt to save some of the tipis by using a helicopter to airlift them to a YMCA Summer Camp failed, as they were too heavy to move. A 330-room Vacation Lodge now sits on the site.

=== Village #5: Bessemer, Alabama ===
The Wigwam Village #5 was built in 1940 in Bessemer, Alabama. It was located 4 miles (6.4 km) north of downtown Bessemer, on U.S. Route 11, and included 15 guest cabins, arranged in a semicircle around the restaurant, restrooms, and offices. Rather than the steel, lath, and plaster of Redford's original design, the Village #5 structures were made of steel, wood, and felt, then covered in canvas and treated with linseed oil.

Village #5 went out of business in 1964, and was demolished after falling into ruin, although the restaurant reportedly stood until 1970.

=== Village #6: Holbrook, Arizona ===
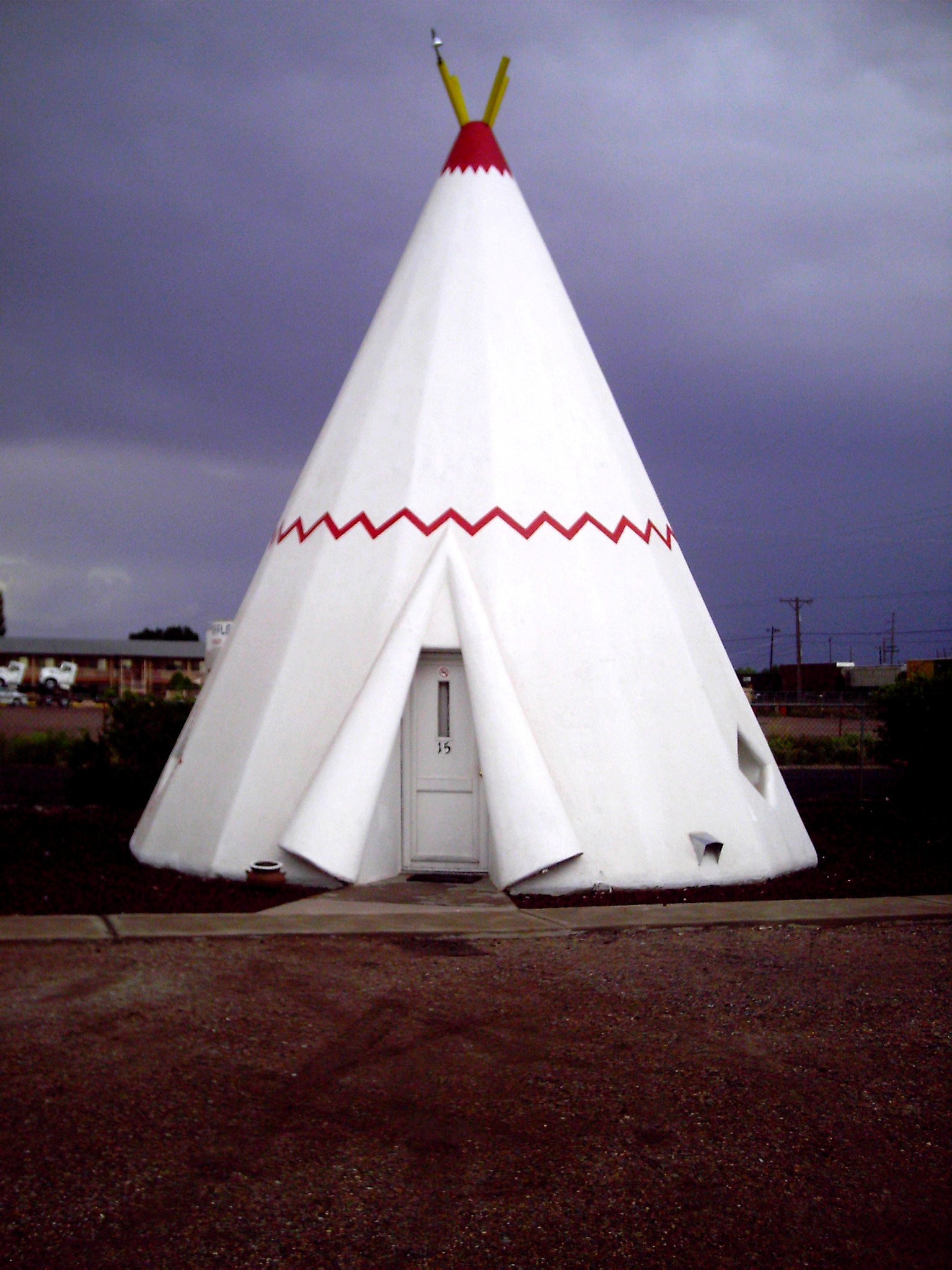
Individual unit, Wigwam Motel, Holbrook, Arizona

Arizona motel owner Chester E. Lewis built this Wigwam Village in 1950. It is located on the historic Route 66, at 811 West Hopi Drive in Holbrook, Arizona. Nearby places of interest include Petrified Forest National Park, Meteor Crater (Barringer Crater), and the Grand Canyon.

The plans for this motel were based on the original of Frank A. Redford. Lewis first became aware of the distinctive wigwam designs when passing through Cave City in 1938. He purchased the rights to Redford's design, as well as the right to use the name "Wigwam Village," in a novel royalty agreement: coin-operated radios would be installed in Lewis's Wigwam Village, and every dime inserted for 30 minutes of play would be sent to Redford as payment.

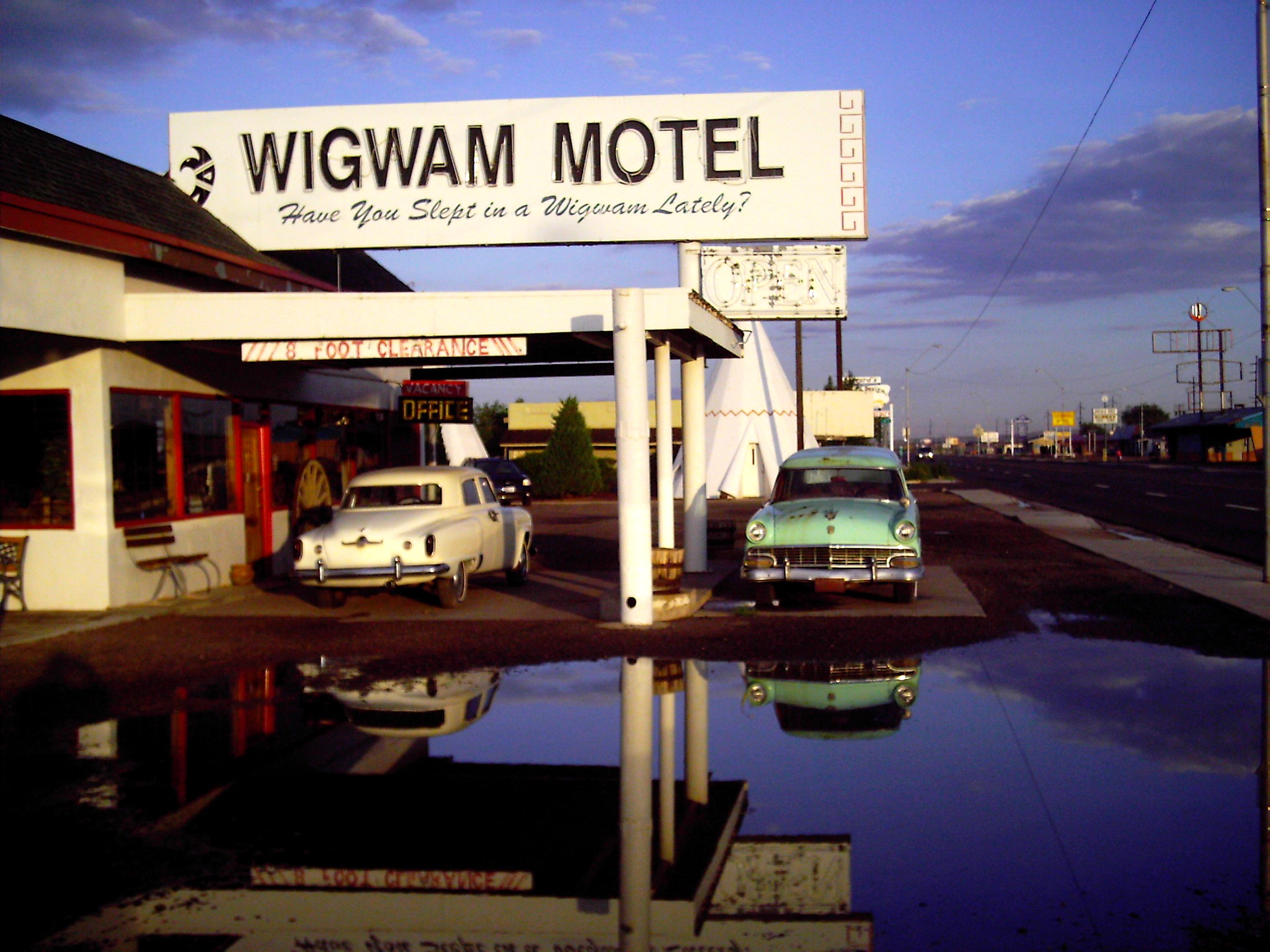
Wigwam Motel, Holbrook, Arizona

The motel is arranged as a square, with 15 concrete and steel wigwams on three sides and the main office on the fourth, flanked by two smaller sized wigwams; there was also originally a gas station on the complex. The individual units are called "wigwams", not "rooms" or "tepees" or "cabins". The units are numbered from 1 to 16 (there is no 13). The base diameter is 14 feet (4.3 m), with each unit 32 feet (9.8 m) in height. Behind the main room of each unit is a small bathroom with sink, toilet and shower. Current rooms contain the original restored hickory furniture, two double beds, satellite TV and a window-mounted air conditioner. In keeping with the authenticity of the restoration, there are no telephones or ice machine.

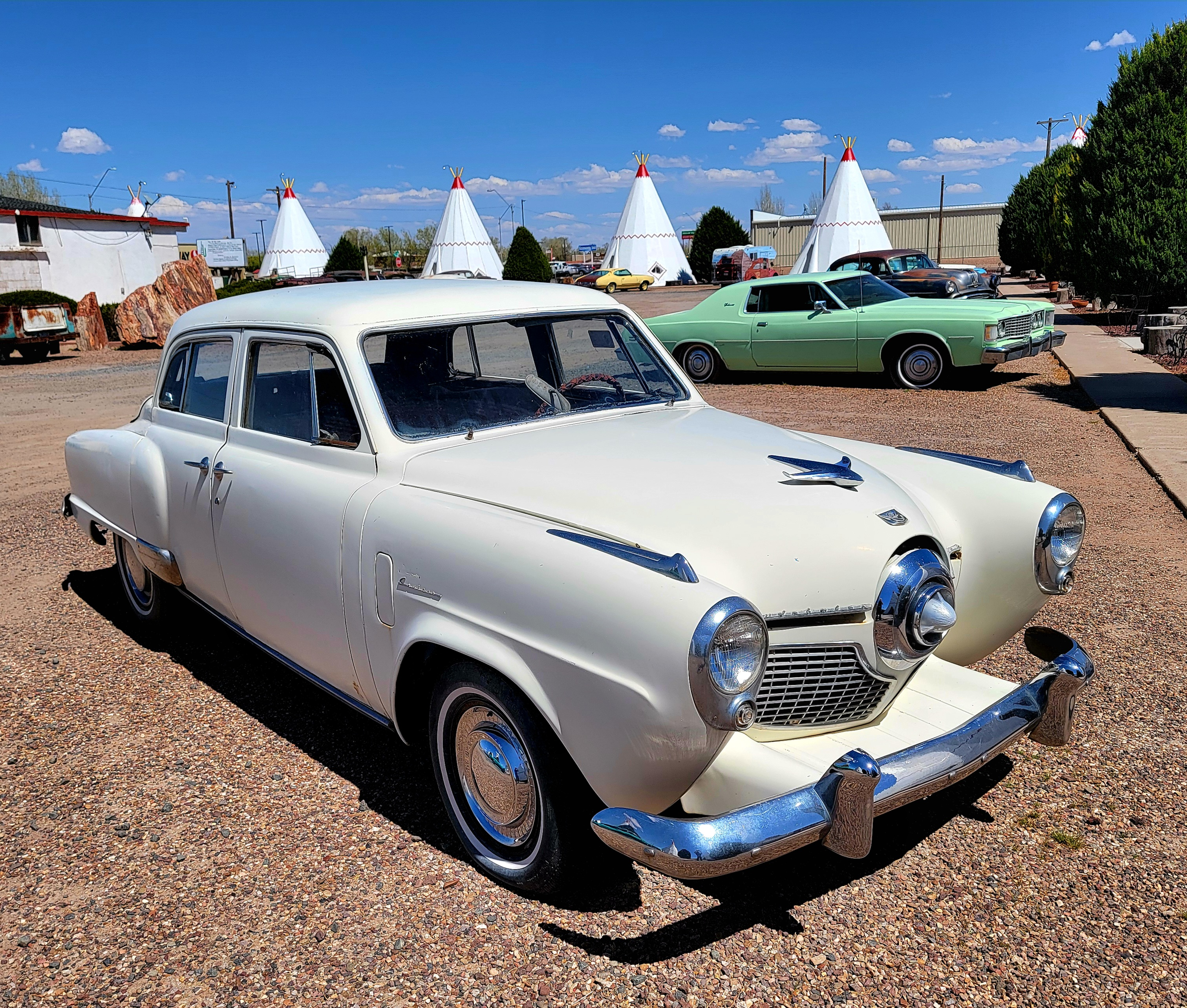
Studebaker at the Wigwam Motel in Holbrook, Arizona

Vintage restored automobiles from the 1960s and earlier are located throughout the parking area. Small green metal benches etched with the words "Wigwam Village #6" are scattered throughout the complex as well. Lewis operated the motel until closing it in 1974 when Interstate 40 bypassed downtown Holbrook. He died in 1986; two years later, sons Clifton and Paul Lewis and daughter Elinor renovated the motel and reopened it.

The Lewis family continues to run and maintain Wigwam Village #6. Near the registration desk is a small room that contains much of Chester Lewis's memorabilia, including a collection of petrified wood.

Wigwam Village #6 has been listed in the National Register of Historic Places since May 2, 2002.

=== Village #7: San Bernardino, California ===
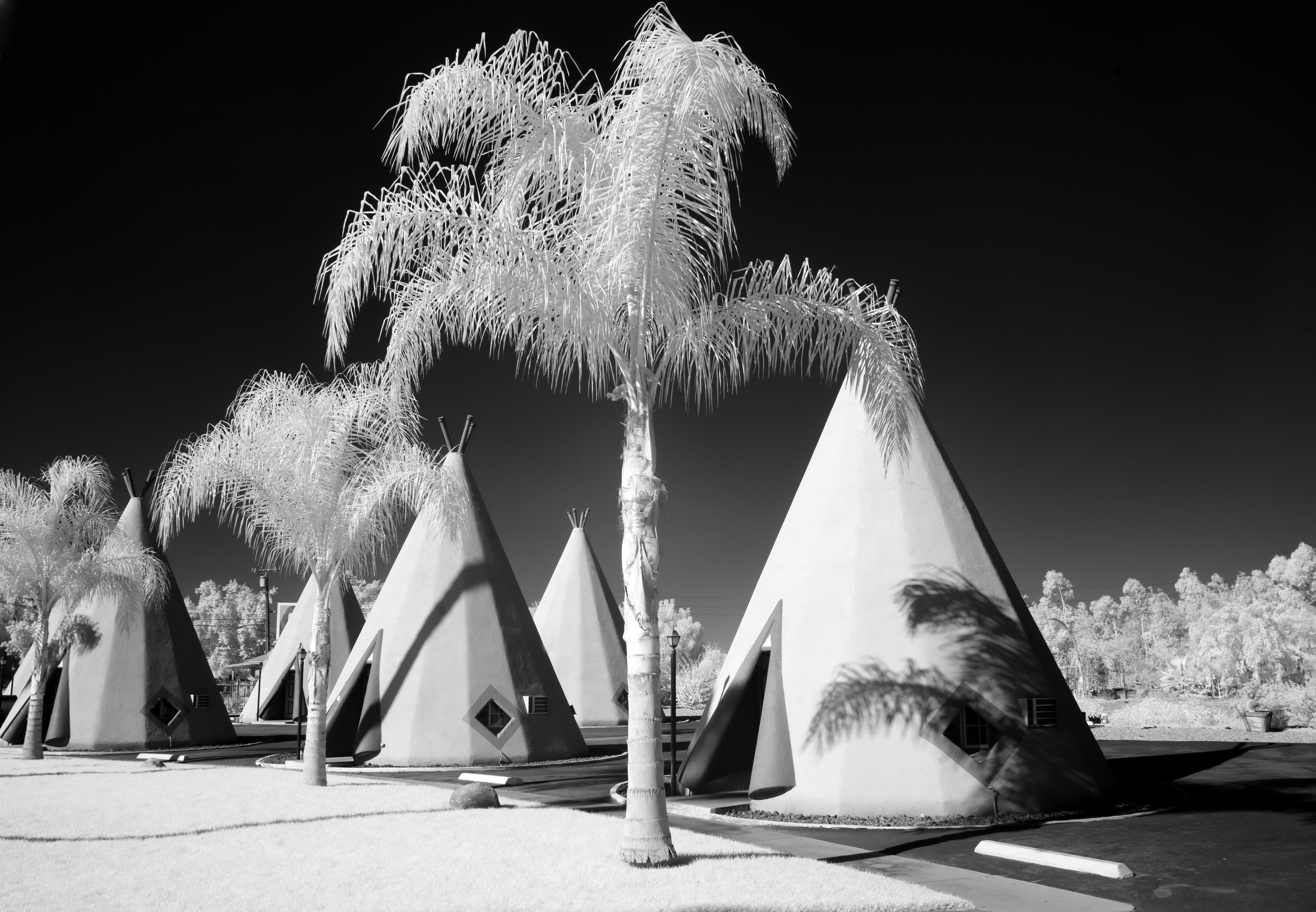
Wigwam Village No. 7

Frank Redford built this complex for himself in 1947–49 and not as a franchise. The address of the motel is Rialto, California, but the motel is physically located in San Bernardino. It is on the boundary between the two cities on historic Route 66, with an address of 2728 East Foothill Boulevard, Rialto, California.

Unlike the one arch of wigwams in other surviving villages, Village #7 has a double row of wigwam guest rooms. They total 20 in number, as well as a base for what seems to be another never-completed wigwam in the back of the property. A central building is currently used as an office, with a lobby that is open 24 hours a day. There is also a swimming pool, a large grass front and palm trees surround the property.

The property had become very run down and rooms were rented by the hour, aggravated by a sign advertising "Do it in a Tee Pee" that is still on site in the back. The complex underwent renovation, for which the National Historic Route 66 Federation awarded the Cyrus Avery Award in 2005. Attention to detail was the main focus during renovation, as the wigwams lost their zigzag pattern.

Since 2012, the motel has been listed on the National Register of Historic Places.

== Other wigwam-like motels ==
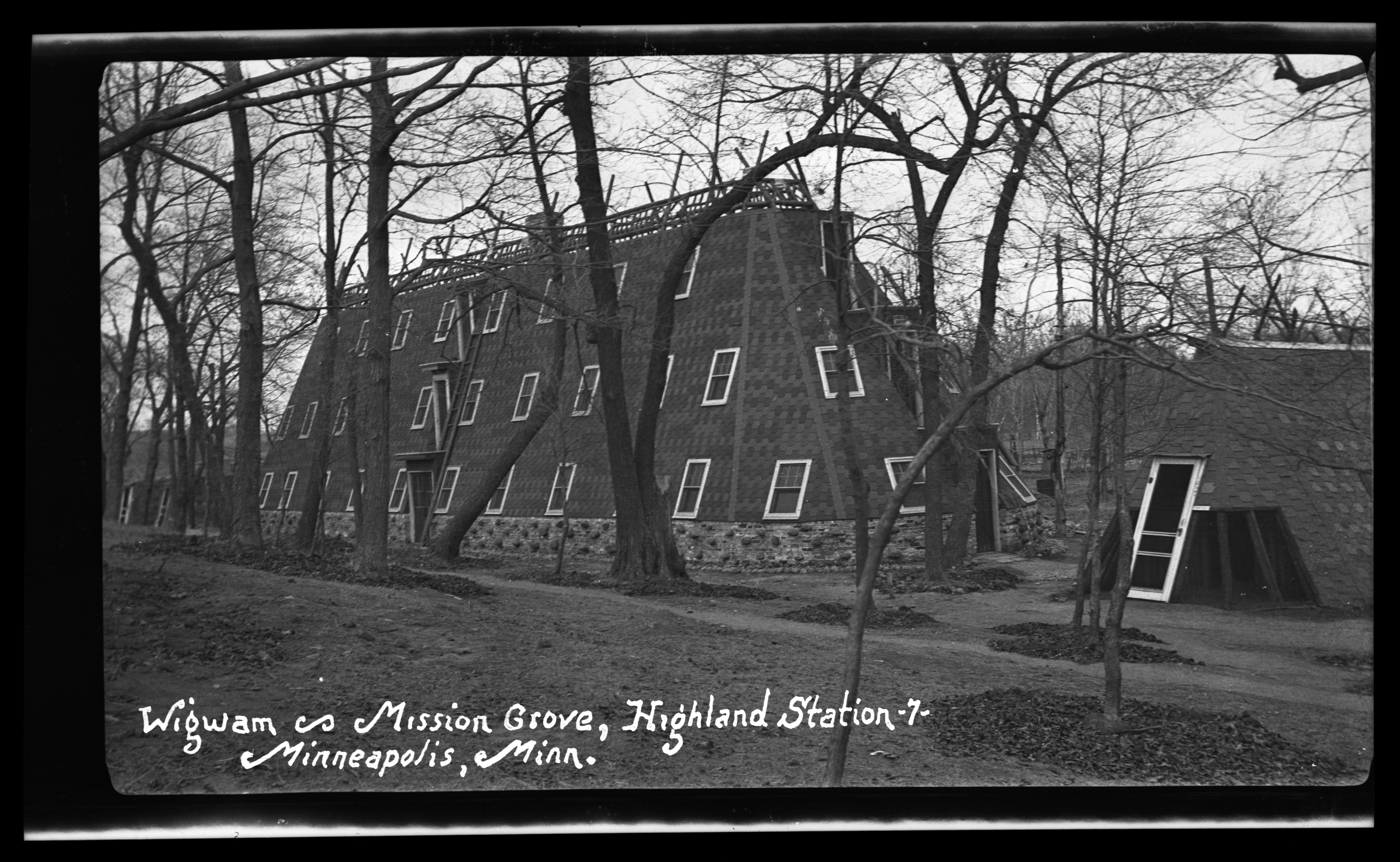
Part of the Mission Grove, or Mission Farms, complex near Medicine Lake, in Plymouth, Minnesota, circa 1934.

The Tee Pee Motel in Wharton, Texas near Houston, which was built in 1942 by George and Toppie Belcher; George Belcher had the idea while on vacation in Wyoming. It is not of the same design nor heritage as the Wigwam Motels; each of the tipis at the Tee Pee Motel are of different shapes, and line up in a straight line. The Belchers sold the motel in 1955, and it had been in disrepair for decades. A man named Dan Ryan bought it in 1995, but subsequent attempts to locate him failed, and the taxes on the property were not paid. Then, in July 2003, Bryon Woods, a diesel mechanic, won the Texas Lottery. At his wife's urging, Woods bought the property. Modern conveniences were added, and the Tee Pee Motel reopened for business in October 2006. In March 2012 the motel was the site of a large drugs seizure. It closed in 2017, due to flood damage from Hurricane Harvey.

Similar motels also stood in San Antonio, Port Neches, and Corsicana, Texas.

== Appearances in popular culture ==
The motels and their imitators have been parodied many times. Rockstar's 2004 Grand Theft Auto: San Andreas game contains a Tee Pee Motel. In the 2006 Pixar film Cars, one of the characters Sally Carrera runs a "newly refurbished" neon-lit motel that is clearly inspired by Wigwam Village #6. The motel is called the Cozy Cone Motel, and each room is fashioned as a traffic cone.

In 2012 a digitally altered image of Wigwam Village #6 appeared in an advertisement for Microtel Inn and Suites.

Wigwam number 1 of the Holbrook, Arizona, Wigwam Village #6 was featured in the second episode of Oprah and Gayle's Big Adventures on The Oprah Winfrey Show.

Wigwam Village #6 is featured in the 1991 movie The Dark Wind, based on the 1982 Tony Hillerman novel of the same name.

Wigwam Village #7 is featured in Bobcat Goldthwait's 2011 black comedy film God Bless America. Joan Didion mentions #7 in her essay "Some Dreamers of the Golden Dream", included in her 1968 collection Slouching Towards Bethlehem.

== See also ==
- Tee Pee Drive-In
- Tee Pee Restaurant
- List of motels
