= Holbrook station (Arizona) =

Former train station in Navajo County, Arizona

Coordinates: 34.9001°N 110.1585°W

Holbrook
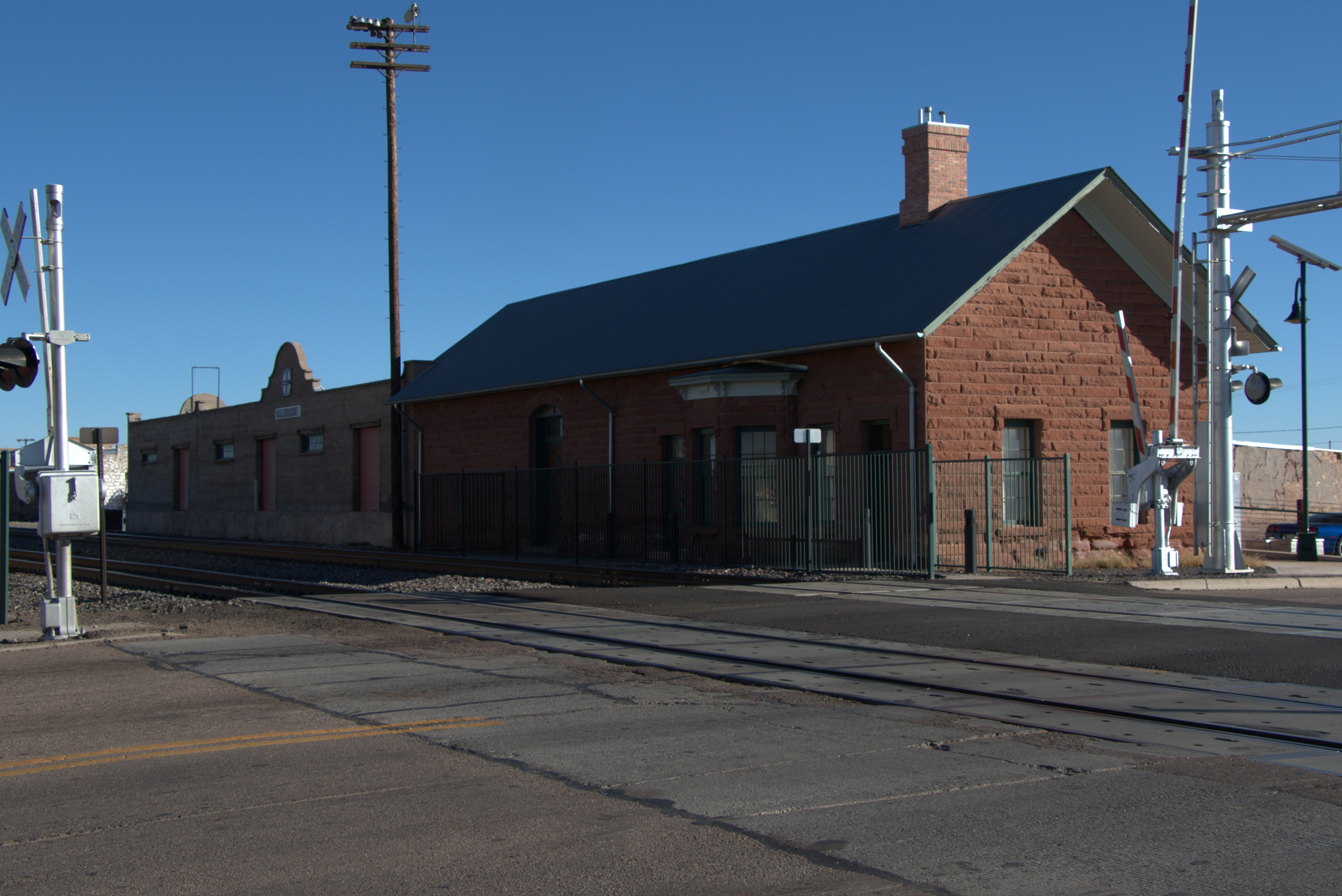
- The station, in November 2015

General information
- Location: Purple Heart Trail (U.S. Route 180) and E. Bucket of Blood Drive, Holbrook, Arizona

History
- Opened: 1892
- Closed: 1984
- Rebuilt: 1907, 1912, 2006

Former services
Preceding station	Atchison, Topeka and Santa Fe Railway	Following station
Joseph City toward Los Angeles	Main Line	Carrizo toward Chicago
Location

Holbrook was a train station in Holbrook, Arizona, United States, formerly served by the trains of the Atchison, Topeka and Santa Fe Railway prior to the creation of Amtrak in 1971.

== History ==
The Atlantic and Pacific Railroad laid tracks through Holbrook in 1881. This station, built in 1892, replaced the earlier station. As traffic grew, additions were made in 1907 and 1912. Santa Fe continued to serve this station with the Grand Canyon until the discontinuance of that train in 1971.

The station was restored in 2006.

After Geromino's surrender, some of his people were brought from Fort Apache to Holbrook's station where they boarded a train for Florida (Navajo County Historical Society records. Geromino, after his capture was taken to Fort Bowie and put on a train to Florida from the Bowie Station. August 2016)
