= Aztec Land & Cattle Company =

Historic land company in Arizona

Aztec Land and Cattle Company
- Traded as: OTCID Basic: AZLCZ
- Founded: 1884
- Founder: Edward Kinsley
- Headquarters: Phoenix, Arizona, US
- Website: www.azteclandco.com

Aztec Land and Cattle Company, Limited ("Aztec") is a land company with a historic presence in Arizona. It was formed in 1884 and incorporated in early 1885 as a cattle ranching operation that purchased 1,000,000 acres in northern Arizona from the Atlantic & Pacific Railroad. It then imported approximately 32,000 head of cattle from Texas and commenced ranching operations in Arizona. Because Aztec's brand was a hash knife, a cooking tool used by chuckwagons to prepare beef hash, the company was known more famously as The Hashknife Outfit. The company has been in continuous existence since 1884.

== History ==
=== Foundation ===
Aztec was incorporated in New York, New York, in 1885 by a group of investors led by Edward Kinsley, a wool merchant and member of the State Board of Railroad Commissioners of Massachusetts, and Henry Warren, a former lieutenant in the Union army with some, albeit limited, ranching experience. The investors were hoping to take advantage of the recent drop in cattle prices. In the early 1880s, drought had become a serious problem to ranchers in Texas. To recoup their investment, many of these ranchers left their cattle herds intact during the dry times with the intention of selling off the cattle when the market was better, which resulted in overgrazing. By 1885, the beef industry had collapsed because thousands of cattle in west Texas, held off the market for better prices, were either dead or starving on barren plains. Separately, the Atlantic & Pacific Railroad was having financial difficulties and sold 1,000,000 acres of Arizona grassland to Aztec at $0.50 per acre. Aztec then entered a joint venture with the Continental Cattle Company of Texas and began exporting droughted-out cattle from Continental's Texas range to Arizona via rail and traditional cattle drives. The original Aztec headquarters was located across the Little Colorado River from Saint Joseph, Arizona (now Joseph City), but was moved to Holbrook, Arizona shortly afterward.

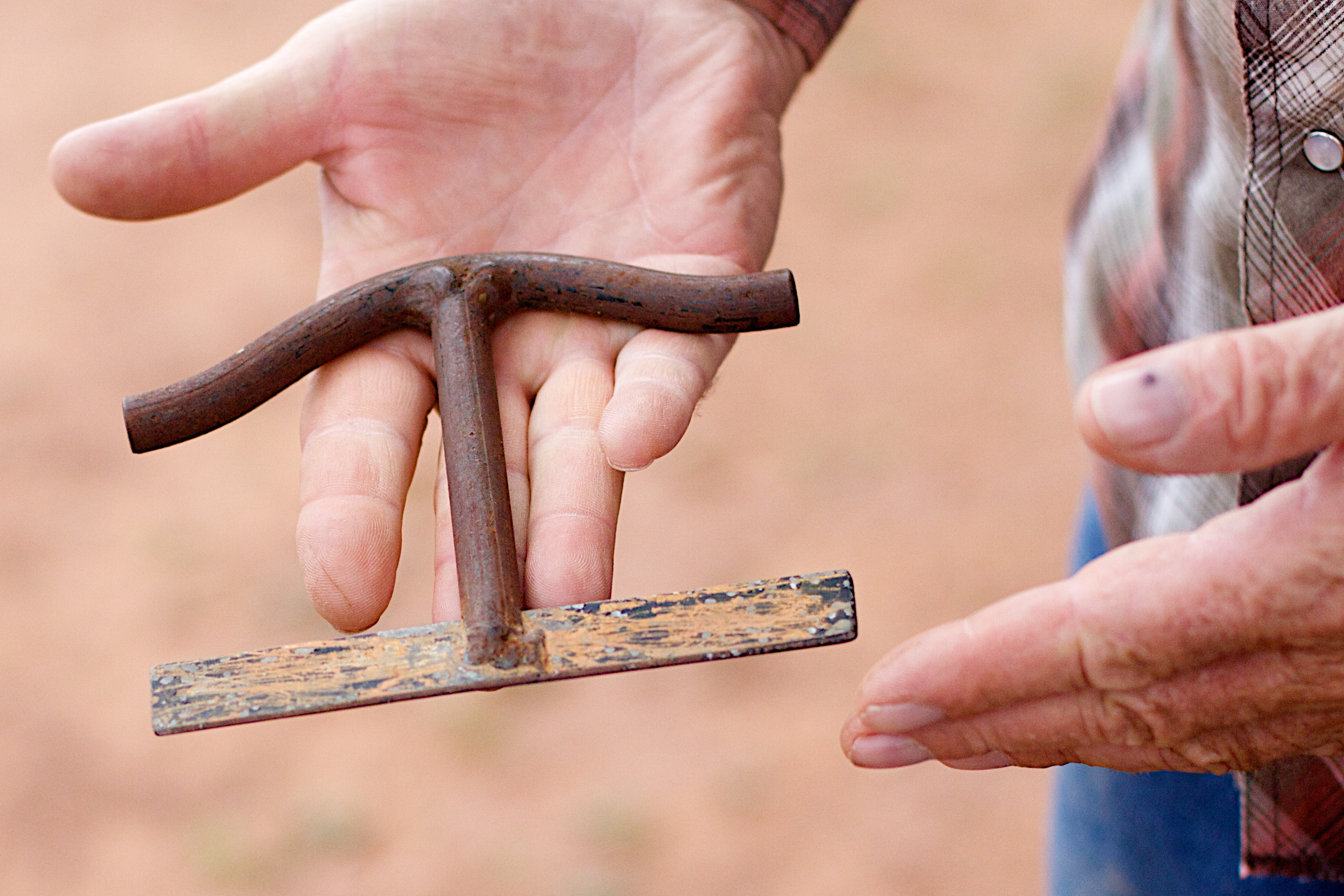
An original hash knife used by 19th century chuckwagons to prepare beef hash

In addition to the cattle, Aztec acquired one of Continental's brands, the Hashknife, because the cattle it imported from Texas were already branded with it. In these new and unsettled Western ranches, it was especially important for cattle to be branded to prove ownership and minimize theft, which was common and at times rampant. The Hashknife brand was registered in Arizona, as it was in Texas, and placed, after 1895, on the left rib of cattle and left shoulder of horses. For both cattle and horses, the blade faced up. Some of the original Hashknife cowboys also came west to work the new ranch in Arizona, among them, according to Aztec's records, a cowboy known only as "Baconrind Bill".

=== Sheep wars and future leaders ===
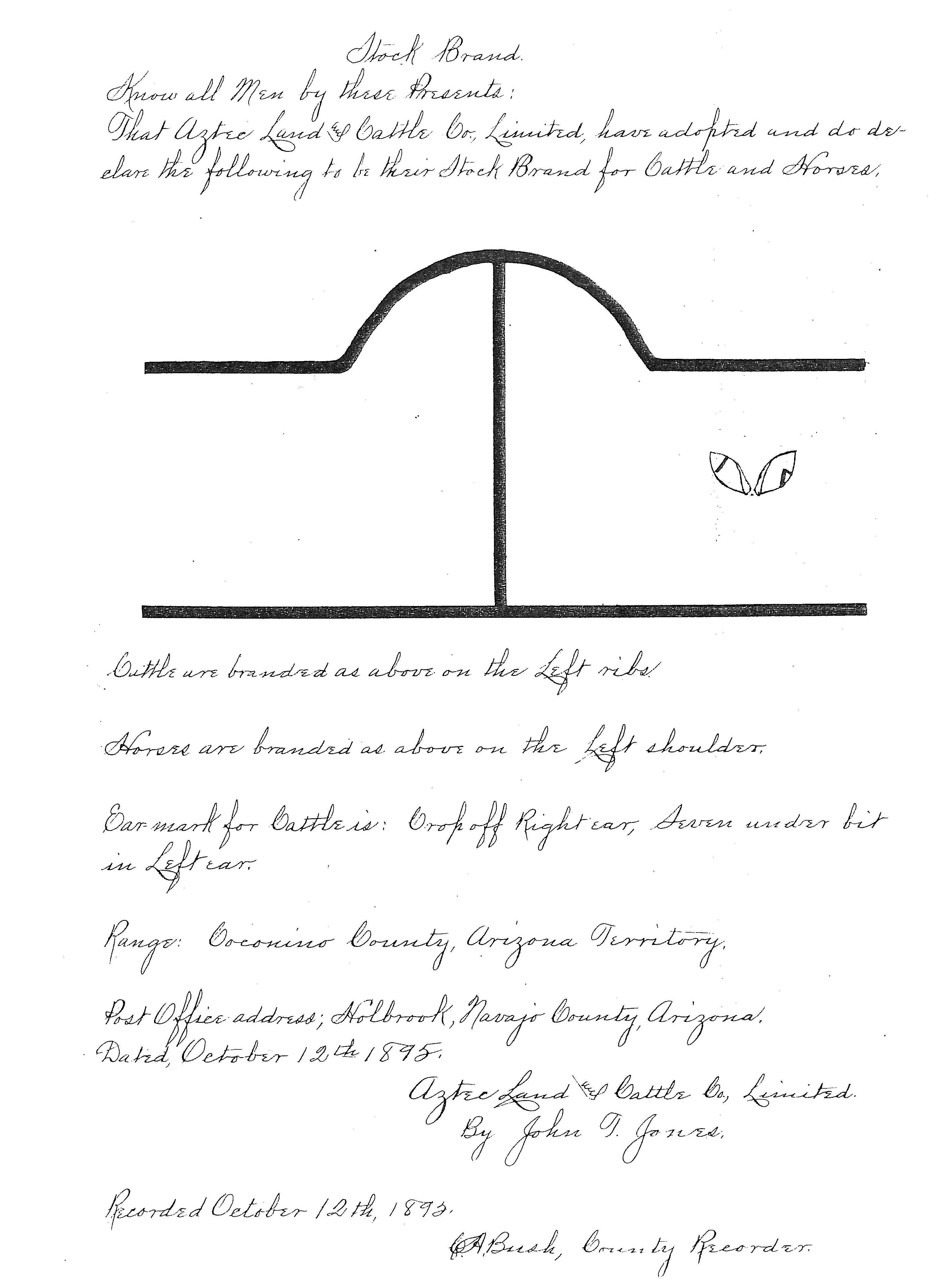
Hashknife brand

Several of Aztec's early employees were Texas cowboys whose abilities made them legends among their fellow ranchers during their years in Arizona. Some were involved in Arizona's Pleasant Valley War in the late 1880s and early 1890s, a decade-long feud between cattlemen and sheep herders over rangeland and resources that took place, in part, on Aztec land. A few were killed in that war, but a number went on to become local, state, and national leaders of some repute. Among these, E. J. Simpson, one of the Aztec's earliest ranch superintendents and member of the Arizona Territory Legislature had a son in this time frame, William Hood Simpson, who became the commander of the 9th Army in Europe during the worst fighting of World War II. Another former employee, and son of an Aztec stockholder, Henry M. Atkinson, later founded Georgia Power in Atlanta in 1902, which is now a subsidiary of the Southern Company, an electrical utility in the southeast U.S.

== Present ==
=== Change of strategy ===
Aztec continued ranching until about 1905, when after years of drought, harsh winters and low cattle prices, the company sold its cattle. Robert H. Carlock, a long-time principal in Aztec and author of Aztec's most comprehensive history, summarized both Aztec's initial business strategy and the cause of its troubles:

Cattle were supposed to generate the cash flow that would be paid to the stockholders as dividends. The land would be there … to secure the loans and expenses until the cattle could carry it. But the cattle never made it.

After selling its cattle, Aztec embarked on a program of leasing its grazing land to local cattle ranchers—a program that continues to this day. Many of the company's current grazing lessees are direct descendants of its original lessees.

As of 2017, Aztec and its affiliates own approximately 240,000 acres in Navajo County, Arizona and 320,000 acres of mineral rights (some without surface ownership) in Navajo and Coconino Counties. It is the second largest private landowner in Arizona and holds one of the few remaining large-scale tracts of rural private land available for development in the state. Robert H. Carlock observed, "Aztec's land has changed little in the past century. When traveling between Winslow and Flagstaff on I-40, if one looks south some forty or fifty miles, the thin blue line of the [Mogollon] Rim, still the southern boundary of Aztec's vast acreage, can be seen."

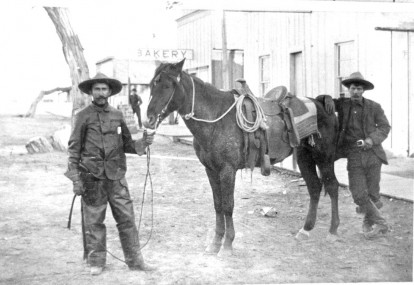
Hashknife cowboys in Holbrook, c. 1900

Aztec, with a partner, also owns the Apache Railway, a Class III short-line railroad running for 55 miles off the BNSF Railway's transcontinental mainline near Holbrook, Arizona. The Apache Railway serves much of Aztec's land, providing access to both national and international markets, and has operated continuously since its incorporation in 1917.

== In popular culture ==
- The Hash Knife Outfit is the title of a Zane Grey western novel published in 1933.

== See also ==
- The Church of Jesus Christ of Latter-day Saints in Arizona
- Canyon Diablo shootout
- Empire Ranch
