= The Bucket of Blood =

Public house in Hayle, Cornwall, England

Coordinates: 50.1954°N 5.414°W

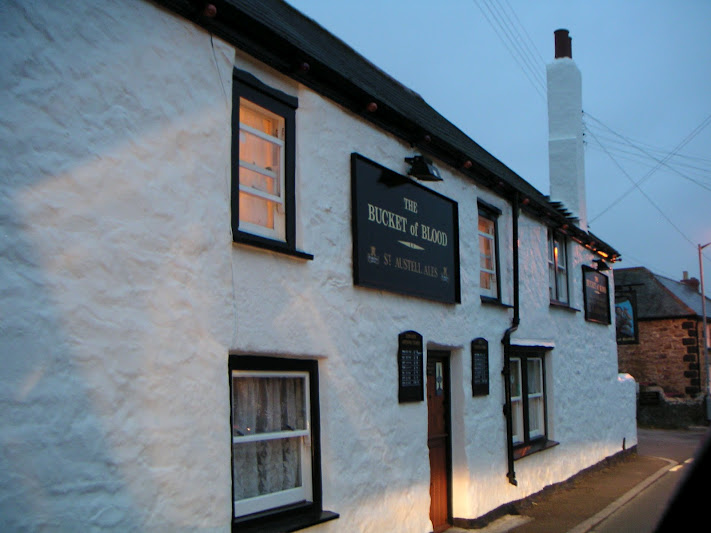

The Bucket of Blood is a public house in Phillack, Hayle, Cornwall, owned by St Austell Brewery and currently tenanted by Nick and Tanya Swanson. It is thought to be named after an incident where the landlord brought up a bucket of blood from the building's well. The resulting investigation revealed the corpse of a murdered Customs Officer which had been dropped there and the name has been recognised as one of the quirkiest in the country. The earliest parts of the building date from the late 13th century or early 14th century, as it was originally built to accommodate the construction of the neighbouring Phillack church, which was completed in the early 14th C. The pub was built from rubble with a slate roof. It was designated Grade II listed status on 14 January 1988.

== Building ==
The earliest parts of the building date from the late 13th century or early 14th century. there are written records of the pub from the 1700s, but the building is known to be much older than that. It was built using rubble with a slate roof. At each end of the building there is a brick chimney. The building has a 19th-century extension on one side to make an L-shaped plan. The interior was remodelled during the 20th century. The public house was designated Grade II listed status on 14 January 1988.

== Name ==
According to local folklore, the Bucket of Blood got its name many years ago when the landlord went to the on-site well to get a bucket of water but found there to be just blood. Further investigation revealed the corpse of a murdered Customs Officer which had been dropped there. An alternative theory is that the well on the grounds would provide red water due to run off from local tin mining The name was recognised as one of the quirkiest in the country in 2011.

== Current status ==
The building is owned by St Austell Brewery's and the current landlord and landlady, Nick & Tanya Swanson, took over the tenancy and business in January 2024. In previous years Rick Shackelton ran the public house from when his father died in 1965.
