= Sheep wars =

Grazing rights conflicts in the Western United States

- Part of the range wars
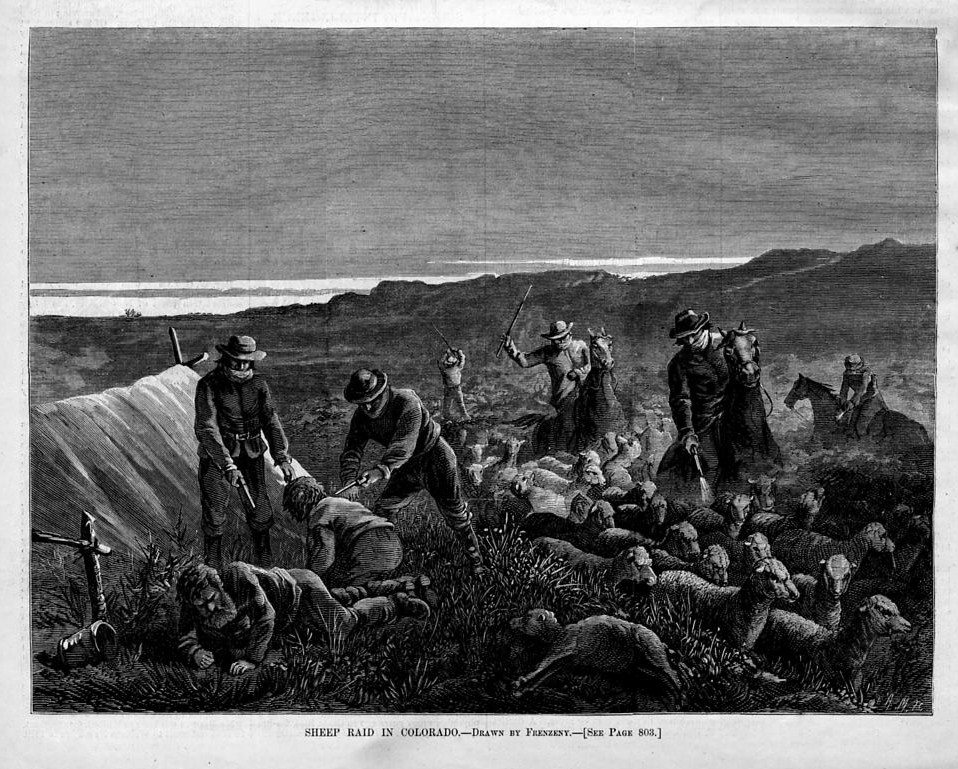
- Sheep Raid in Colorado, by Harper's Weekly.
- Date: c. 1870–1920
- Location: Western United States
- Deaths: ~54

The sheep wars, or the sheep and cattle wars, were a series of armed conflicts in the Western United States fought between sheepmen and cattlemen over grazing rights. Sheep wars occurred in many western states, though they were most common in Texas, Arizona, and the border region of Wyoming and Colorado. Generally, the cattlemen saw the sheepherders as invaders who destroyed the public grazing lands, which they had to share on a first-come, first-served basis. Between 1870 and 1920, approximately 120 engagements occurred in eight states or territories. At least 54 men were killed and some 50,000 to over 100,000 sheep were slaughtered.

== History ==
=== Texas ===
Cattle ranching was a well established trade in Texas by 1870, when sheepherding was starting to become popular in other parts of the Old West. Because of this, in Texas and elsewhere, many cattlemen had close relationships with local government figures and were able to use this influence to their advantage. According to one unnamed Texas historian, "In court action, the cowboy [cattleman] usually won." The sheepherders were always the weaker of the antagonists. They were often advocates of free grazing on public land, while the cattlemen typically fenced off the territory, whether it was public or private land. There were many reasons why cattle ranchers built fences. Mostly it was to mark boundaries, prevent rustling, and keep others from grazing their animals there. There was also the threat of sheep scab. Building fences across the range infuriated the sheepherders, as well as open range cattlemen, so conflicts like the Fence Cutting War became almost inevitable. One of the earliest sheep wars was fought in 1875, in the Charles Goodnight range along the Texas-New Mexico border. Later, sheep wars occurred in the central and West Texas counties of Schleicher, Nolan, Brown, Crane, Tom Green, San Saba and Coleman.

On March 9, 1881, the state of Texas passed a law authorizing the appointment of sheep inspectors, who were to quarantine sheep infected with sheep scab (mange). However, the law only drove the sheepherders "under cover." There were also laws passed that prevented sheepherders from grazing on public land entirely. Enforcement was largely ineffective though, because there were no representatives of the United States General Land Office in West Texas. In April 1883, another law was passed that called for sheepherders to present a certificate showing that their herd had been inspected for scabies before crossing any county borders. Cutting fences became a felony in 1884 and, around the same time, West Texas experienced a land rush, which sealed off many sheep and cattlemen from accessing public land. In some cases, sheepherders were forced to cut fences and cross into private property in order to reach public land but, eventually, "a type of code was evolved that required the herder to drive his flocks at least five miles a day on level terrain or at least three miles a day in rougher country [when crossing private land]." Compared to other American states, the level of violence in the Texas sheep wars was minimal.

=== Arizona ===
Of all the range wars in American history, the Pleasant Valley War in Arizona was the most costly. It was fought between the families of John D. Tewksbury and Tom Graham. Though both the Tewksbury and Graham families were cattle ranchers, the former supported the sheepherders when they began entering Pleasant Valley in 1885. The sudden appearance of large flocks of sheep on public land, that had been previously used exclusively for cattle, was unnerving for many cowboys, so they "began to unite in defending their range against the sheep." By 1886 it was illegal for sheepherders to move their herds within two miles of cattle grazing land and the Mogollon Rim was an unofficial border, or deadline, which no sheep were permitted south of. Pleasant Valley was located beyond the border so when the Daggs Brothers and the Tewksburys began moving in sheep, the local cattle ranchers, such as the Grahams, resisted violently by attacking the sheepherders. The Grahams and the Tewksburys had been feuding since 1882 but the first bloodshed wasn't until 1885 when John D. Tewksbury leased a herd of sheep from the Daggs Brothers and had it driven into Pleasant Valley by a Basque sheepherder. Somewhere along the trail, the sheepherder was ambushed and killed by Andy Cooper, a member of the Graham faction and associate of the Hashknife cowboys, who were also in conflict with sheepherders. A second incident occurred in February 1887. A Ute shepherd was beheaded about two miles north of the Graham Ranches while he was driving some of the Daggs' sheep through the area. Though no one was ever charged, Tom Graham is believed to have been responsible. The United States Army later dispatched Indian scouts to follow the murderer's trail and, according to author Leland J. Hanchett, the tracks led to Tom's cabin.

The situation escalated into a gunfight at the Middleton Ranch on August 9, 1887. The ranch was owned by a man named George Newton, who was a family friend of the Tewksburys. Members of the Graham faction and some Hashknife cowboys were out searching for Mart Blevins, dead or alive, and they assumed the Tewksburys knew something about his disappearance. The group included five men and was led by Hampton Blevins, the son of Mart and the half-brother of Andy Cooper, who killed the Basque sheepherder. Three of the other men were the Hashknife cowboys John Payne, Thomas Carrington and Robert Glaspie. The final man was another cowboy named Tom Tucker. There were six men occupying the Middleton Ranch when Blevins' party arrived, three of whom were Tewksburys. At first, Blevins' party approached the ranch house and requested food for the night but, at some point, they rode off and began shooting towards the house. However, other accounts say that the first shots were fired from the men inside the house. What is known is that Hampton and John Payne were dead, without loss to the Tewksbury's side. Tucker and Glaspie were also wounded and Carrington "escaped with his clothing perforated by a bullet." A clear defeat for the Graham faction, the war turned into a long series of revenge killings and had little to do with sheep after the first encounters. By the time the war ended, in 1892, about twenty-five people had been killed, including all of the men in the Graham family and most of the Blevins and the Tewksbury families.

There were other sheep wars in Arizona, besides the Graham-Tewksbury feud. In 1884, near the San Francisco Mountain, angry cattlemen rounded up over 100 wild horses, strapped cowbells to their necks, rawhide to their tails, and then drove them into a series of sheep herds numbering more than 25,000, yelling and firing guns in the process. The sheep scattered in all directions, many were killed or wounded and it took a week to gather up and separate the surviving stock. That same year, cowboys drove over 4,000 sheep into the Little Colorado River, many of which died in quicksand.

=== Wyoming and Colorado ===
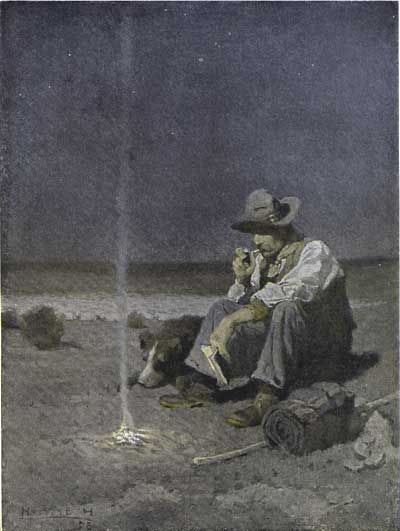
The Plains Herder by N.C. Wyeth, 1909.

The sheep wars in Wyoming and Colorado were exceptionally violent and lasted until well after the turn of the century. Like in Texas and Arizona, the cattlemen of Colorado were unwilling to share their pastures with the sheepherders, who were crossing into the state from southern Wyoming. In Wyoming alone there were about twenty-four attacks and at least six deaths between 1879 and 1909, though other accounts say that over sixteen people were killed. The most well known of the conflicts was the Routt County Sheep War, in which the cattlemen of Routt County, Colorado attempted to keep the Wyoming sheepherders from entering their grazing ranges. On May 23, 1895, the newspaper Cheyenne Leader reported that four days the Little Snake River at the Wyoming line [border], were contemplating an invasion of the Bear River cattle ranges. The effect was electrical, and by noon today fully 350 cattlemen and feeders were assembled to decide upon positive action to keep the sheep back...." Shortly after that, the cattlemen adopted a series of resolutions that established deadlines and effectively banned all sheepherders from entering northwestern Colorado. However, the newspaper Cheyenne Leader reported that the sheepherders would most likely disregard the ban and enter the state anyway. To enforce the resolutions, the newspaper said, the "stock feeders and cowboys [cattlemen], with a force of eight hundred to a thousand are holding themselves in readiness forcibly to resist any advance made south of Hahn’s Peak (near Pearl Lake), by the sheep owners.... A war is imminent and unless the more conservative heads prevail, the rifle will figure a conspicuous part in a Routt County sheep war. The sheep that are causing the trouble are some sixty thousand head belonging to J. G. and G.W. Edwards and others in Wyoming."

Despite the newspaper's claim, most of the sheepherders respected the cattlemen's resolve, which defused the situation before it became too serious. There were, however, at least four violent episodes in the region during the time. The first occurred in 1894, in Garfield County, Colorado, when 3,800 sheep were driven over cliffs into Parachute Creek. The sheepherder, Carl Brown, attempted to stop the cowboys from killing the flock but he was shot in his hip. When a posse from Parachute, Colorado rode out to the scene, they found the wounded Brown and a "mass of dead sheep at the foot of a 1,000-foot bluff." The Craig Courier paper reported the following on September 14, 1894; "The owners [of the sheep] are residents of Parachute with rights to the adjacent range and the posse made a futile race to apprehend the raiders. John Miller owned seventeen hundred of the sheep and Charles Brown, uncle of the wounded man, twenty-one hundred." About 1,500 more sheep were massacred the same year in the same county. According to Jack Edwards of Wyoming, in late June 1896, two of his sheepherders were killed by nearby Colorado cowboys and 300 of his herd was massacred. Upon learning of the raid, Edwards headed towards the scene but he was intercepted by a "party of masked men," who ordered him to remove the rest of his flock back across the state border. After the raid, on January 23, 1897, Edwards told an Omaha, Nebraska newspaper reporter the following; "I have an armed force of about fifty [men] ready for the clash when it comes. I am compelled to keep a small army about my place all the time. A short time ago three hundred sheep were killed and two herders; for a while it looked as though the entire Colorado militia would have to be called out, but the sheepmen and cattlemen looked out for themselves, and there are several graves in the vicinity of Meeker, Colorado that go to show that they know how to do this." Another incident took place on the morning of November 15, 1899, when forty masked men attacked a sheep camp located on the lower Little Snake River. During the foray, over 3,000 sheep were "clubbed and scattered", the shepherds were robbed and their wagon was burned.

Some of the more serious raids, outside of the northwestern Colorado area, occurred in 1887, 1896, 1902, 1905 and 1909. In 1887, nearly 2,600 heads belonging to Charles Herbert perished when some cowboys burned down his corrals at Tie Siding, Wyoming. In 1896 in Wyoming, about 12,000 sheep were slaughtered in a single night by being driven off a cliff near North Rock Springs, Wyoming. The violence reached its height after the turn of the century (1890s / 1900s). In 1902, near Thermopolis, Wyoming, several thousand sheep were slaughtered and their herders killed. During the summer of 1905, ten masked men attacked a sheep camp on Shell Creek, in the Big Horn Basin. There the cowboys clubbed about 4,000 sheep, out of 7,000, burned the wagons and two sheep dogs. The owner of the massacred flock, Louis A. Gantz, lost about $40,000 as a result. Out of all the sheep raids, the most serious incursion was the Spring Creek Raid of April 2, 1909. Just southwest of Ten Sleep, Wyoming, the sheepherder Joe Allemand and two of his companions were shot and killed by seven or eight masked men. The raiders also killed about twenty-five sheep and two dogs, and burned the wagons with kerosene. Because sheep raiders had never been prosecuted in a Wyoming court before, many believed that the murderers would get away with the massacre. However, seven men were eventually arrested, five of whom were sent to prison. The conviction of the Ten Sleep murderers brought peace to Big Horn County, Wyoming. After the 1909 attack, cattlemen were reluctant to raid sheep camps because now they risked being punished for it. Though there were two more Wyoming sheep raids in 1911 and 1912, no more sheepherders were murdered. The last known sheep raid in adjacent Colorado occurred eight years later, in 1920, when 150 sheep were slaughtered for grazing in the White River National Forest.

According to Robert Elman, author of Badmen of the West, the sheep wars ended because of the decline of open rangeland and changes in ranching practices, which removed the causes for hostilities. The later passage of the Taylor Grazing Act of 1934 also eased some of the remaining economic and social tension.

== See also ==
- Coal Wars
- County seat war
- Family feuds in the United States
- Hell on the Range by Daniel Justin Herman
- Pennamite-Yankee War
- Railroad Wars
- Range war
- Sheepshooters' War

== Bibliography ==
- Davis, John W. (2005). A Vast Amount of Trouble: A History of the Spring Creek Raid. Norman: University of Oklahoma Press. ISBN 978-0-8061-3692-9.
- Hanchett, Leland J. Jr. (1994). Arizona's Graham-Tewkesbury Feud. Phoenix, Arizona: Pine Rim Publishing. ISBN 0-9637785-3-6.
- Elman, Robert (1974). Badmen of the West. Ridge Press. ISBN 0-600-31353-0.
- Barth, Richard C. (1997). Pioneers of the Colorado Parks. Caxton Press. ISBN 0-87004-381-1.
- Pitcher, Don (2006). Moon Handbooks Wyoming. Avalon Travel. ISBN 1-56691-953-3.
