= Bill Brown (rancher) =

American rancher (1855–1941)

William W. Brown
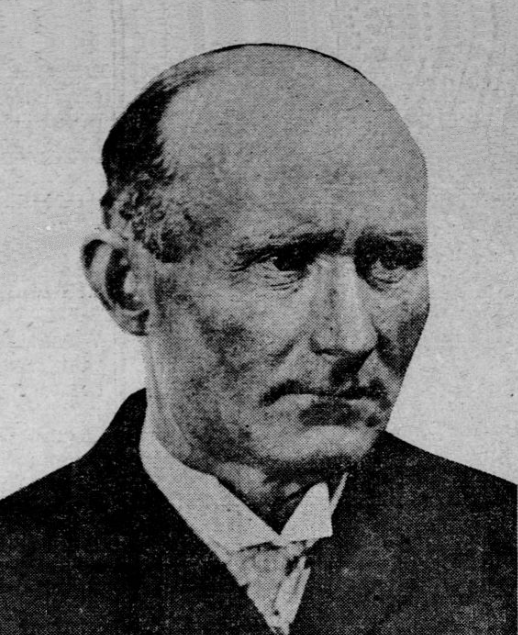
- Bill Brown, circa 1915
- Born: July 19, 1855; Kenosha, Wisconsin, U.S.
- Died: January 11, 1941 (aged 85); Salem, Oregon, U.S.
- Education: California State Normal School
- Occupation: Rancher

William Walter Brown (July 19, 1855 – January 11, 1941) was an American pioneer rancher in central Oregon. He owned two large ranches between Burns and Prineville, Oregon. Together, his properties comprised one of the largest privately owned sheep and horse operations in the United States. He was known as the Horse King of the West and the Millionaire Horse King because over 10,000 horses carried his Horseshoe Bar brand. Brown was also a well-known philanthropist who gave hundreds of thousands of dollars to a wide range of religious and educational institutions.

== Early life ==
Brown's parents, Samuel Brown and Hannah (Ellis) Brown were both born in England. Their families immigrated together to the United States in 1848. The two families settled in Wisconsin in 1850. Samuel and Hannah married in 1851. Their son William was born in Kenosha, Wisconsin on 19 July 1855. He was the third of seven children, which included five boys and two girls.

The Brown family moved to Iowa in 1855, shortly after William's birth. In 1869, the family moved on to Oregon, settling on a farm in Clackamas County between Oregon City and Canby. Brown attended the Oregon City Seminary School and then went on to college in San Jose, California. On his way to California, Brown visited Central Oregon and liked the area. He attended California State Normal School, a state teachers college (now San Jose State University). After graduating in 1878, he taught school in California for three years while he saved his money to invest in a ranching operation.

== Sheep rancher ==
In 1882, Brown and his two younger brothers bought 1,000 sheep in the Willamette Valley and moved them to northeastern Lake County, Oregon. The brothers filed homestead claims on the east side of Wagontire Mountain, where they built a small rustic cabin, with a dirt floor and no windows. To save money, the three brothers did their own sheep herding. In the years after they arrived in the Wagontire area, the brothers began to buy up local properties with water sources. This allowed them to rapidly increase the size of their sheep herd. By the mid-1880s, they were producing 32,000 pounds (15,000 kg) of wool per year.

In 1886, Brown was engaged in a gunfight with a neighbor's hired hand named John Overstreet. The trouble began when Overstreet started grazing his sheep on meadowland owned by the Brown brothers. Brown warned Overstreet that he was trespassing, but Overstreet would not move his sheep off the Brown brother's property. Both men got their guns and exchanged shots, resulting in Overstreet's death. Brown immediately reported the incident to the local justice of the peace in Silver Lake, Oregon. A grand jury later refused to indict him, citing self-defense.

By 1889, the brothers' sheep herds had grown to 10,000 animals. However, that winter was long and extremely cold, with deep snow. As a result, only 500 sheep survived the winter. At that time, Brown bought his brothers' shares in the operation and his brothers returned to the Willamette Valley to start farms. In the following years, Brown rebuilt his sheep herd until his operation had approximately 22,000 animals.

In 1895, a range war between cattlemen and sheepherders began in central Oregon. It was generally a one-sided war with armed cattlemen attacking sheep herds, often killing hundreds (sometimes thousands) of sheep in a single raid. For the most part, Brown's herds escaped this slaughter. This was due in part to the size of his operation and the fact that he owned enough property that he was not reliant on grazing on public lands. However, on one occasion in 1903, 487 of Brown's sheep were killed by riders who were probably part of the Paulina Sheepshooters Association. The range war finally ended in 1906, when the United States Forest Service took control of a large part of the disputed public lands and began issuing grazing permits to local ranchers, with range quotas for both cattle and sheep.

== Ranching empire ==
Brown owned between 34,000 acres (14,000 ha) and 64,000 acres (26,000 ha) of range land. His holdings were spread across at least 30 parcels which included much of the surface water in the very dry high desert environment between the towns of Prineville and Burns. His property included large tracts of land in four Oregon counties: Crook, Harney, Lake, and Deschutes (which was part of Crook County until 1916). Because he controlled most of the water sources in the area, his herds could graze freely across a wide expanse of high desert including large tracts of public lands. The area ran approximately 80 miles (130 km) north to south and 50 miles (80 km) east to west. Brown's eastern neighbor was the cattle baron Bill Hanley, who owned two large ranches south and east of Burns.

Brown divided his operations into two ranches, the Gap Ranch and the Buck Creek Ranch. The Gap Ranch was located 35 miles (56 km) west of Burns, along the area's main east–west wagon road (today it is U.S. Route 20). His main headquarters was at the Buck Creek Ranch, located in an isolated valley 20 miles (32 km) northeast of the Gap Ranch. Prior to 1910, the Buck Creek Ranch was a collection of ramshackle buildings; woolsheds, storehouses, stables, rustic living quarters, and a company store. In 1910, Brown added a new modern fourteen-room house to the ranch complex. The new house had a modern water system, indoor bathrooms, seven or eight bedrooms, a large living room, and an office. Brown furnished it with fine furniture including a dining room table that seated twelve, a piano, and an organ. In addition to the two main ranches, Brown had at least twenty sheep camps that supported eight herds that were constantly moving between his properties and adjacent public lands.

With his operation spread across such a large area, Brown often found the need to order supplies or pay off an employee when he did not have a checkbook at hand. In such cases, he would write out his payment check on any handy piece of paper. This included butcher's paper, soup can labels, and scratch paper; he even wrote checks in newspaper margins. This practice helped him earn the reputation as an eccentric. Nevertheless, Brown was so well known for doing this that merchants and bankers in Burns and Prineville would cash these unusual drafts without question.

By 1909, Brown had an annual income of around $140,000 (equivalent to $5,017,000 in 2025). This included revenue from the sale of horses, rams, and cattle plus approximately 18,000 wool fleeces produced on his ranches.

Throughout his life, Brown was a generous philanthropist. He gave large financial gifts to a wide range of religious and educational institutions, especially the Methodist Episcopal Church and Willamette University. At one time he had even written a will that left $500,000 (equivalent to $17,917,000 in 2025) to those two institutions. In 1907, Brown paid for a new music building at Willamette University and later gave the school 640 acres (2.6 km^{2}) in Harney County. Other significant gifts included a $30,000 (equivalent to $1,075,000 in 2025) donation to Willamette University as well as large contributions to the Presbyterian seminary in Pendleton, another seminary in San Francisco, and the College of Puget Sound in Tacoma, Washington. When his niece was accepted at the University of Oregon, Brown sent the school $25,000 (equivalent to $896,000 in 2025).

== Horse King ==
Sometime around 1892, Brown began buying small horse herds from his neighbors. At that time, horses sold for $3 to $10 per head. Soon he had 7,000 or more horses that he kept on the open range. Brown marked his horses with his Horseshoe Bar brand. To protect his brand he never sold horses to anyone who would use them in Oregon. As a result, Brown could claim any horse in the state that had a Horseshoe Bar brand. Even though Brown owned thousands of horses, he regularly walked the 20 miles (32 km) between his two ranches, a practice that contributed to his reputation as an eccentric character.

When the United States went to war with Spain in 1898, the demand for cavalry and pack horses drove the price up. During the war, Brown sold thousands of horses to the United States Army for $80 to $100 each. During this same period, the British Army also sent buyers to central Oregon to purchase horses for service in the Boer War. After those wars ended, Brown continued to sell thousands of horses to the Army each year. Eventually, newspapers began calling him the Range King, Horse King of the West, and the Millionaire Horse King.

The peak of his horse empire came during World War I, when Brown sold horses to armies from the United States, Canada, Great Britain, and France. He held regular auctions at his Buck Creek Ranch and several other locations, often selling five hundred horses in a single day. Buyers would then hire trail hands to move their newly acquired horses to the railheads at Bend, Crane, or Lakeview for shipment to California, Kansas, and east coast ports. During the war, Brown often sold his horses for $100 ahead. Over the course of the war, he realized an average sale price of $87 per horse.

After the war, the price of horses dropped dramatically as gas-powered motor vehicles replaced horses as people's preferred mode of transportation. Soon, the only significant demand for horses was for canned meat sold overseas and for chicken feed in the United States. However, Brown kept his large herds and retained the numerous employees it took to keep care of his herds. This drained away his resources over the next decade. By 1931, he was almost bankrupt. At that point, he cut his workforce down to five employees, but it was too late to recover financially. In 1932, he had to mortgage his property. His financial collapse was hastened by large-scale horse rustling that went unchecked because his horses ran wild across a huge empty desert area and he did not have enough employees to oversee his stock.

== Later life ==
In 1935, Brown sold his last property holding and remaining livestock for a small amount of money to the Wool Grower Credit Corporation of Portland in lieu of foreclosure. He moved to the Methodist Old People's Home in Salem. Brown had financed the construction of the Methodist home in 1923, one of his many philanthropic gifts to institutions affiliated with the Methodist Church. He remained a bachelor all his life. Brown died of a heart attack at the Methodist home on 11 January 1941. He was buried in the Brown family plot at the Zion Memorial Park cemetery in Canby.

Today, he is remembered as one of eastern Oregon's most colorful characters. He is also remembered for his generous philanthropic gifts to religious and educational institutions throughout the Pacific Northwest. The exact amount of his charitable gifts is unknown, but it was certainly in the hundreds of thousands of dollars. In an interview with the Oregon Journal newspaper in 1936, Brown pointed out that, "The money I have given away will go on doing good long after I am gone".
