= Porum Range War =

1906-1916 range war in Porum, Oklahoma

Porum County War
- Part of the Range Wars
- Date: 1906 – 1916
- Location: Porum, Oklahoma
- Caused by: Stock and grazing dispute
- Result: Inconclusive

Parties
TLH Connected Brand; Anti-Horse Thief Association	Davis Clan; Starr Clan

Lead figures
Judge Thomas Luther Hester	Jack Davis; Joe Davis; Samuel “Pony” Starr

Number
Unknown	Unknown

Casualties and losses
- 30 killed

The Porum Range War was a range war that happened in the town of Porum in Muskogee County, Oklahoma between large ranch owner Judge Thomas Luther Hester and the Davis and Starr families. The feud began due to alleged rustling activities committed by the latter on Hester's TLH Connected Brand, which led to ambushes, gunfights, and the burning of property, leaving 30 people dead. The range war has since been a largely forgotten, but infamous event in Oklahoma, said to rival even the more iconic Lincoln County War.

== Background ==
The feud had its origins in the 1880s when John Porum Davis migrated to Oklahoma, bringing with him four of his sons who were mixed-blood Cherokees: Cicero, Sam, Jack and Bob. A pioneer, John built a small community in a range area called the Porum Gap. The community was merged with the Midland Valley Railroad in 1903, giving birth to a town that was named after John, known as Porum.

However, the settlement of the Davis family was in direct conflict with the area that Judge Hester used for his livestock. The farms of the Davis family and the open range intermixed, and there became a dispute between cattle that belonged to them and to Judge Hester. As the Davis family continued to grow and prosper, Judge Hester began to believe that the family was stealing from his own herd, using a brand that was similar to his. At the same time, the Starr family, who was also of Native American blood, came into the area and sided with the Davis. Outlaw Belle Starr was a member of this family.

To protect his property, Judge Hester began charging Davis repeatedly in court for rustling activities. Also, he and his allies formed the Anti-Horse Thief Association, a vigilante group, to combat the "Davis Gang".

== War ==
The first victim of the war was Cicero Davis, who was shot and killed outside his own home in 1906 by an alleged former colleague named Mack Alford. A few days later Alford was shot and killed. The next person killed was Harvey Lindsey, who was drowned in North Folk by several armed men. Another man, named Spivey, was also killed, allegedly by the Davis. Soon, other smaller ranching families joined the war on the side of the Association. Besides the murders, barns were also burned, including those belonging to enemies of the Davis such as the Pierce, Martins, and Price clans. In addition, Sheriff Jim Work was killed on the orders of Bob Davis.

=== Battle of Porum ===
In May 1911, a group of thirty masked vigilantes, rode to the home of the Starr family, determined to kill Jack Davis and Pony Starr, after Jack had sent a sheriff to investigate Hester's ranch in the account of twenty cattle stolen. Upon seeing the group, Pony Starr and Joe Davis (Jack's son), ran back inside the house and grabbed their rifles. A fierce shootout commenced between the two parties, which lasted for 10 minutes, and ended in the retreat of the vigilante group, and the deaths of between 3 and 8 men and the wounding of many more. One of those killed was Judge Hester's son, Cliff.

=== Assassination attempt on Jack Davis ===
One afternoon, while outside his ranch house, Jack was shot upon by multiple men. The ambush left Jack with a crippled arm. A week later, Jack discovered two of his assailants outside of the Commercial National Bank. This time, now prepared, Jack fired at the two with a Winchester rifle, killing one and wounding the other. The wounded man, McCullugh, survived.

== Aftermath ==
Many of the feuding families began leaving Porum throughout the years, eventually leading to the war's undramatic close. Joe Davis ran away from an investigation concerning the Battle of Porum, becoming a criminal in Arizona who robbed trains and banks before authorities finally nabbed him in 1916 and sent him to a penitentiary at Leavenworth, Kansas.
