= Sheepshooters' War =

1895–1906 conflict between cattle ranchers and sheepherders in Oregon

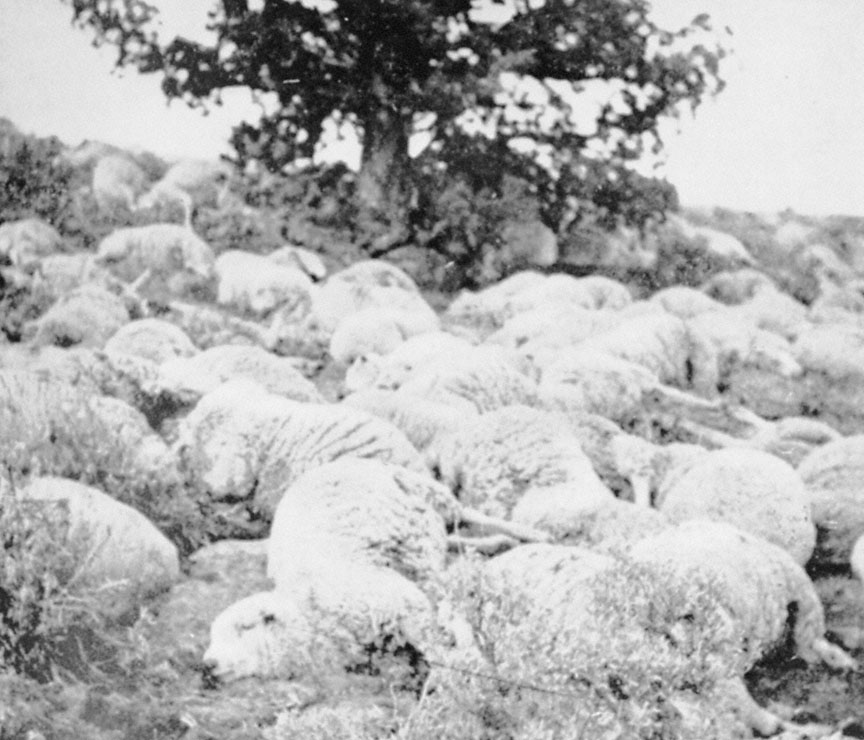
- Slaughtered sheep near Willow Creek, Oregon, in 1904.
- Date: 1895–1906
- Location: Oregon, USA
- Deaths: ~3

The Sheepshooters' War was an armed conflict fought in central and eastern Oregon. Like other range wars in the Old West, the war pitted cattlemen against sheepherders. Because the cattlemen were unwilling to share the open range with the sheepherders, due to concerns about overgrazing, they formed paramilitary organizations with the goal of eliminating the flocks of sheep and anyone who attempted to stop them. Between 1895 and 1906, the Sheepshooters, as they were called, slaughtered at least 25,000 sheep. A few men were also killed during gunfights or related incidents.

== The war ==
Since the cattle industry arrived first in Oregon, the cattlemen, or cattle barons, held a monopoly on Oregon's pasturelands in the east of the state. So, when they arrived, the sheepherders quickly became a threat to the cattle industry. Sheep were known to strip a valley clean of all vegetation, leaving it barren and desolate, while cattle ate only grass, leaving behind weeds, which held down the topsoil and allowed grass to regrow. Some cowboys even asserted that sheep stunk very badly and left behind smelly fields that cattle would not use. Water was also a concern; sheep polluted water holes to a point that cattle couldn't drink from them without becoming ill. The cattlemen weren't entirely guiltless themselves; even though the open range meant public land, the cattlemen were known for fencing off territory that didn't belong to them, in order to prevent sheepherders, or other ranchers, from using the resources. By the early 1880s, sheepherding was becoming more and more popular in Oregon, but the cattlemen and the newcomers seemed to coexist mostly peacefully until 1895, when the first Sheepshooters group was formed in Grant County. Calling themselves the "Izee Sheepshooters," the cowboys began attacking sheep camps and establishing deadlines, a type of border in which sheep were not allowed to cross. Because the Izee cowboys were successful with their campaigns, a "Sheepshooters Association" was formed in neighboring Crook County and another in Union County. According to the Insiders' Guide to Bend and Central Oregon, all of the sheepshooters agreed that "if a sheepherder was killed during a mission, he would be buried on the spot" and "if one of their own were killed, he would be brought home to be buried, with no mention of how he met his demise." Also, "if any association member was captured by the law [police] and brought to trial, he was duty-bound to lie on the witness stand about his involvement with the group."

Usually the sheepshooters would launch a surprise attack on a camp, capture the herders, and then shoot or club all of the sheep. Often the herders were beaten, but occasionally there were small shootouts. According to William R. Racy, a rancher interviewed by author Richard Negri, he met an old sheepherder who was the victor of one of the gunfights, though the story has not been confirmed.

William R. Racy said the following:

I was working for a sheepman up in Oregon, and I noticed this one man never said a word. An old man to men then, I was only fifteen, but he was sixty, sixty-five, possibly even seventy. I was night-herding the sheep this time, lambing time. All I do is ride around the herd to heep the coyotes shoved back from getting any lambs. I was talking to the herder one day, and I said, 'Do you know this fellow?' He said yes and told me his name. And I said, 'Well what gives with him? I have known him for about three months now, and I have never heard him say a word.' So then this herder told me the story. Now, this was back years ago, back during the cattle and sheep wars. He was running his sheep up on this high desert in Oregon. Three cowboys came through, and they caught him and they beat him half to death. They got him on his hands and knees and made him walk around his herd of sheep and baa like a sheep. When he got to the farthest side of the herd, they'd had their fun and turned him lose. Well, he crawled back through his herd and got back to his camp. He revived himself as best he could, and he got his saddle horse and his rifle, and he went after them. He caught up with them and he killed one, wounded one, and captured the third one. When they [the local authorities] had the trial he was acquitted with self defense. But they went out and got the wounded man and the dead man. The wounded man told him (they got sent to the penitentiary), 'When I get out of jail I'm going to kill you, boy, for sending me to the penitentiary.' Well, right then the herder was a young man, only in his late teens, maybe twenty or so, and he didn't think too much about it. As time went on that bore on his mind and he pulled some strings, and he got the man paroled. Then as time went on it started to bore on his mind of killing that man, and he turned into a vegetable. And that was what he was when I knew him. So you see, even in the rough days of the cattle wars you can't kill a man and brush it off like a soar throat. On the range that's a pretty serious offense.

The conflict didn't reach its height until after the turn of the century and most of the violence occurred in the High Desert, between the Cascades and the Blue Mountains. By 1898, the Cascade Range Forest Reserve was expanding its boundaries. This meant that sheepherders, who had used the area unmolested for years, were now suddenly forced to go elsewhere to raise their animals. Many headed east towards the Blue Mountains, an area already exploited by cattle. Over time, the influx of sheep into the Blue Mountains area led to overgrazing. Deadlines were established and large sheep massacres became very common. Sometimes the cowboys left notices attached to a tree that marked the boundary. A typical notice would be similar to the following: "Warning to Sheep Men – You are hereby ordered to keep your sheep on the north side of plainly marked line or you will suffer the consequences. Signed Inland Sheep Shooters." One of the largest sheep massacres occurred in 1903, on the High Desert near Benjamin Lake. Nearly 2,400 sheep were "herded off a rimrock" and those that survived the fall were shot to death. In 1904, over 6,000 sheep were killed in three central Oregon counties, although the secretary of the Crook County Sheepshooters Association claimed that his men had killed between 8,000 and 10,000. The only known human death attributed to the conflict occurred on or about March 4, 1904. John Creed Conn was neither a cattleman or a sheepherder, but a storekeeper from the town of Silver Lake. He was, however, the brother of a district attorney and member of a prominent family. Though investigators concluded that the death was a suicide, Conn's body was found outside of town, seven weeks later, with two bullet holes in the chest, wounds that the doctor who performed the autopsy said could only have been caused by another person.

The war ended in the latter half of 1906, when the Blue Mountain Forest Reserve was created by the Department of Agriculture and when the United States government began establishing grazing allotments. Because the cattlemen and the sheepherders were no longer sharing the same land, there was no more reason to fight each other.

== See also ==
- List of feuds in the United States
