= Porum, Oklahoma =

- Town
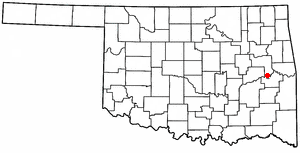
- Location in Oklahoma
- Coordinates: 35°21′26″N 95°15′49″W
- Country: United States
- State: Oklahoma
- County: Muskogee

Area
  - Total: 0.92 sq mi (2.37 km^{2})
  - Land: 0.89 sq mi (2.31 km^{2})
  - Water: 0.023 sq mi (0.06 km^{2})
- Elevation: 584 ft (178 m)

Population (2020)
  - Total: 602
  - Density: 674.6/sq mi (260.45/km^{2})
- Time zone: UTC-6 (Central (CST))
  - Summer (DST): UTC-5 (CDT)
- ZIP Code: 74455
- Area codes: 539/918
- FIPS code: 40-60250
- GNIS feature ID: 2412500

Porum is a town in Muskogee County, Oklahoma, United States. It was named for John Porum Davis, a rancher, Civil War veteran, and Cherokee Nation councilman from the Canadian District in Indian Territory. The community was first known as Porum Gap, which united with another village named Starvilla in 1905. The product of this union became the present town of Porum. The population was 602 at the 2020 census, down from 727 in 2010.

== History ==
The area is rich in history, including that of the Starr clan who were of the Cherokee "Treaty faction" and became immersed in troubles during the early turbulent days of the Cherokee Nation. They were attacked by, and counterattacked, men of the Ross faction. Tom Starr was alleged to have killed 100 men in his time, although the figure may be exaggerated. Tom was a half-blood, Irish and Cherokee, and had five sons, one of whom was Sam who became the husband of Belle Starr, forever linked with the history of Porum. In later years, Pony Starr who lived on the edge of Porum was involved in the Porum Range War and was regarded as the straightest shot and most fearless man of his clan.

A post office was established in Porum Gap March 25, 1890. The Midland Valley Railroad came to the Porum area in 1903. The town of Porum was formed in 1905, following the merger of Porum Gap and Starvilla.

== Geography ==
Porum is in southeastern Muskogee County, approximately 30 miles (48 km) south of Muskogee, the county seat. State Highway 2 passes through the town as Second Street, leading north 10 miles (16 km) to Warner and south 7 miles (11 km) to Whitefield.

According to the U.S. Census Bureau, the town has a total area of 0.92 square miles (2.38 km^{2}), of which 0.89 square miles (2.31 km^{2}) are land and 0.02 square miles (0.05 km^{2}), or 2.62%, are water.

== Demographics ==
Historical population
Census	Pop.	Note	%±
1910	548		—
1920	533		−2.7%
1930	471		−11.6%
1940	502		6.6%
1950	616		22.7%
1960	573		−7.0%
1970	658		14.8%
1980	668		1.5%
1990	851		27.4%
2000	725		−14.8%
2010	727		0.3%
2020	602		−17.2%
U.S. Decennial Census

=== 2020 census ===
As of the 2020 census, Porum had a population of 602. The median age was 34.0 years. 31.6% of residents were under the age of 18 and 15.3% of residents were 65 years of age or older. For every 100 females there were 102.7 males, and for every 100 females age 18 and over there were 97.1 males age 18 and over.

0.0% of residents lived in urban areas, while 100.0% lived in rural areas.

There were 236 households in Porum, of which 33.5% had children under the age of 18 living in them. Of all households, 34.7% were married-couple households, 25.8% were households with a male householder and no spouse or partner present, and 33.1% were households with a female householder and no spouse or partner present. About 35.2% of all households were made up of individuals and 16.1% had someone living alone who was 65 years of age or older.

There were 304 housing units, of which 22.4% were vacant. The homeowner vacancy rate was 0.0% and the rental vacancy rate was 28.7%.

Racial composition as of the 2020 census
Race	Number	Percent
White	335	56.0%
Black or African American	1	0.2%
American Indian and Alaska Native	196	32.6%
Asian	1	0.1%
Native Hawaiian and Other Pacific Islander	1	0.1%
Some other race	1	0.2%
Two or more races	67	11.1%
Hispanic or Latino (of any race)	4	0.7%

=== 2000 census ===
As of the 2000 census, the median income for a household in the town was $18,009, and the median income for a family was $19,474. Males had a median income of $25,357 versus $18,333 for females. The per capita income for the town was $9,147. About 35.3% of families and 41.3% of the population were below the poverty line, including 51.0% of those under age 18 and 33.0% of those age 65 or over.
