= Dewey–Berry Feud =

1901–1903 range war in Rawlings County, Kansas

Dewey-Berry Feud
- Part of the Range Wars
- Date: 1901–1903
- Location: Rawlins County, Kansas
- Caused by: Land dispute
- Result: Near annihilation of the Berry Clan males

Parties
Dewey Cattle Company	Berry Clan

Lead figures
Chauncey Dewey	Daniel Berry

Number
Unknown	Unknown

Casualties and losses
- 3 killed

The Dewey-Berry Feud was a range war that occurred in Rawlins County, Kansas in 1901 to 1903 between the Dewey Cattle Company led by Chauncey Dewey and the Berry clan led by Daniel Berry. Considered one of the most controversial events in Kansas history, as well as one of the last range wars of the Wild West, the feud is remembered today in books and songs remembering the event.

== Background ==
Following a fad that was popular to Eastern upperclassmen of the time, the Dewey family decided to open up a ranch in the Western territories in 1899. To the native ranchers of that area, these individuals were known disparagingly as "dudes". However, the man set up for the task, Chauncey Dewey, planned to create a large and successful ranching business in Kansas, rather than a short-term hobby like his contemporaries. He established the Dewey Cattle Company, with the Oak Ranch as his main headquarters.

On the other hand, Daniel Berry was among several settlers who went westwards to take the opportunity presented by the Homestead Acts. Being from the East himself, Berry brought his family to Kansas in 1885, where they survived several calamities such as blizzards and droughts to establish their livelihood in the area. Together with other "sodbusters", Berry and many others planned to create a community of small farmers and ranchers in the county. Their plans fell in conflict with that of Chauncey Dewey.

== Feud ==
The first shots of the war occurred in 1901 when it was reported by Antone Kemnitz and several others, that the Berry clan fired their guns whenever Dewey cowboys herded cattle or fixed fences. Although no one was injured, this became too frequent for the Dewey cowboys to handle. Chauncey Dewey also accused the Berrys with cutting fences, rustling cattle, and vandalizing buildings and wells. In the spring of 1902, Daniel Berry and his nephew were jailed for allegedly assaulting Dewey employees as they planted barley in a field once owned by the Berrys. There were also warrants for Daniel's sons, Burch and Beech, but the two managed to hide out from the law. On April 21, 1902, a group of between 70-100 homesteaders and Berry allies, led by Alpheaus Berry, went to the jail to protest what they perceived as "unjust imprisonment". Daniel Berry was soon freed from the jail.

With the conflict continuing to simmer, both sides began to further arm themselves. Although Chauncey Dewey was a noted marksman, he hired several former soldiers into his company. This included William McBride, who served in the US Army for 31 years, most notably as stable sergeant in the 16th Battery of the U.S. Field Artillery at Fort Leavenworth; and Clyde Wilson, who was member of the 20th Kansas Volunteer Infantry and a veteran of the Philippine-American War. The conflict finally climaxed on June 3, 1903, when Chauncey Dewey bought Alpheaus Berry's 15-barrel wood stock tank. Although purchased legally, Dewey was forced to bring with him several men after Burch Berry allegedly brandished a pistol and threatened Dewey's men who came to get it. As Dewey and his men arrived at Alpheaus's farm, they were met by Daniel and Viola Berry, the latter whom was carrying her infant child. More Berry clan members arrived upon seeing Dewey's men, notably Alpheaus, Burch, Beech and Roy.

The meeting soon became heated and a gunfight erupted. Although who shot first is still disputed to this day, Daniel, Alpheaus and Burch Berry were killed and Roy was seriously wounded. Beech Berry managed to take cover behind a barn but was also wounded when he tried to run. Although unscathed, Viola was allegedly threatened by Dewey cowboy Tom O’Neill. Cheyenne County Sheriff McCulloch arrested Chauncey Dewey and several of his men at Oak Ranch. A mob of Berry allies had formed up, forcing the sheriff to request assistance from Governor W.J. Bailey. Company G, 2nd Regiment, led by one Captain Cunningham, arrived to assist in escorting the Dewey faction from Oak Ranch to St. Francis.

== Aftermath ==
A lengthy trial followed, with both sides claiming that the other party shot first. Roy Berry survived his wound and was carried to the court on a cot to provide testimony. In the end, the court ruled in favor of not guilty for the Dewey faction. In what became known as one of the most controversial trials in Kansas history, several Berry supporters protested the verdict by hanging and burning effigies of the jury in front of the court house. That being said, further proceedings resulted in Chauncey Dewey paying the Berrys $15,000 by the 1920s.

== In other media ==
V. L. Nicholson published a piece in the Topeka-Capital Journal entitled "Last Survivor Tells of Kansas Range War" on November 23, 1958. A folk song entitled "The Dewey-Berry Song" was also written in commemoration of the feud.
