= Range war =

Conflict over control of range land used for grazing

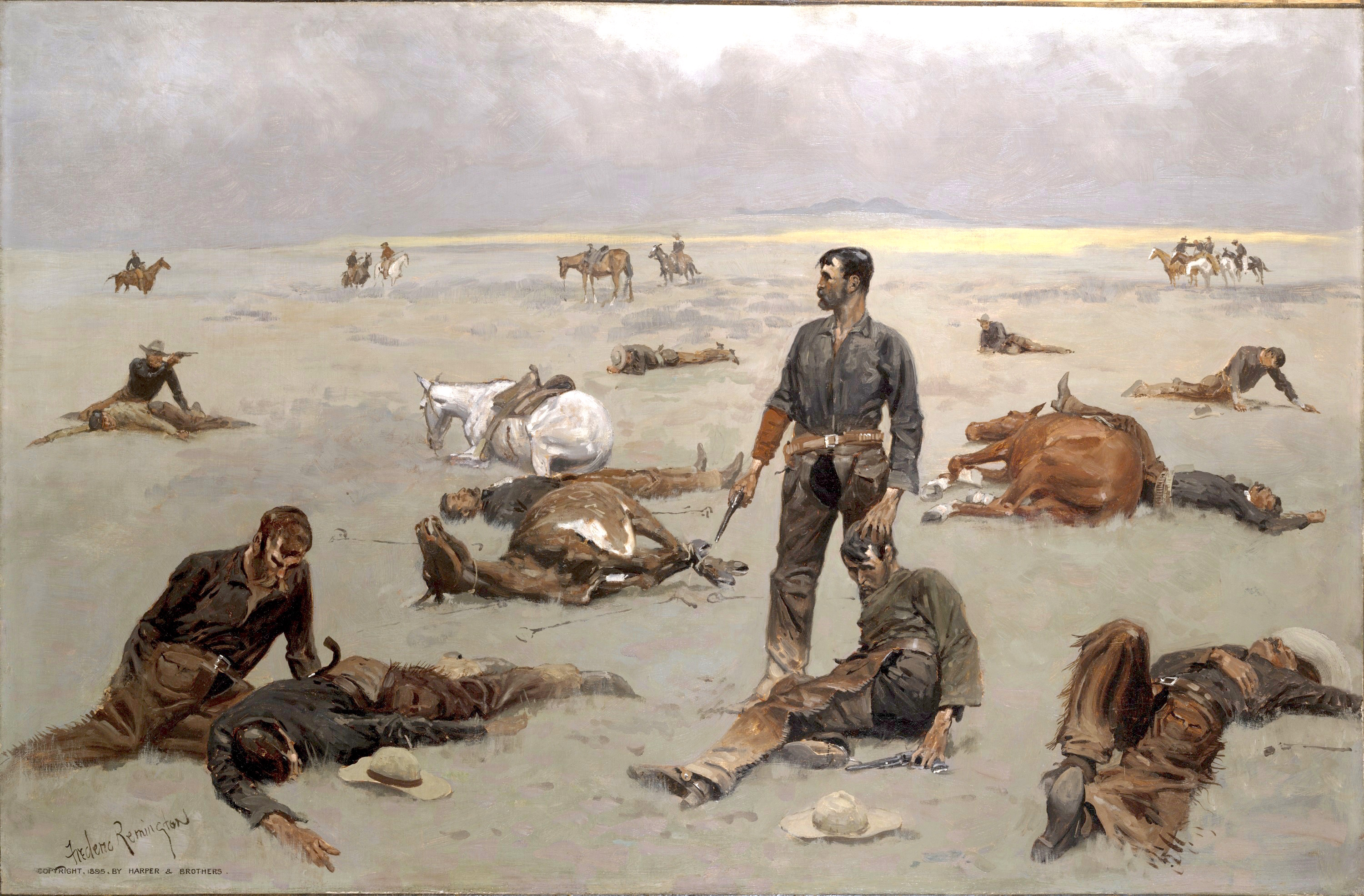
What An Unbranded Cow Has Cost by Frederic Remington, which depicts the aftermath of a range war between cowboys and supposed rustlers. 1895

A range war, also known as range conflict or cattle war, is a type of usually violent conflict, most commonly in the 19th and early 20th centuries in the American West. The subject of these conflicts was control of "open range", or range land freely used for cattle grazing, or as sheep pasture, which gave these conflicts its name. Typically they were disputes over water rights, grazing rights, or cattle ownership.

Range wars occurred prior to the Taylor Grazing Act of 1934, which regulated grazing allotments on public land. Range wars included the Pleasant Valley War, Colfax County War, Castaic Range War, San Elizario Salt War, Mason County War, Porum Range War, Johnson County War, Pecos War, Lincoln County War, Fence Cutting Wars, Sheep Wars, Barber–Mizell feud, Dewey-Berry Feud, Stuart's Stranglers conflict, and others.

While in previous centuries violence may have been involved, the term is now applied to nonviolent competition for scarce resources, such as between ranchers and environmentalists, or between ranchers and fans of wild horses.

A range war is also a slang term for a turf war or disagreement about proper hierarchy or relationship and is often used in a joking manner. In this sense, the term is found in politics and business.

== In literature and the arts ==
Range wars have been the subject of movies and novels. Some examples are:

- Range War (1939) is a movie (featuring Hopalong Cassidy) about a group of ranchers in conflict with a railway company.
- The Westerner (1940) is a film dealing with cattlemen versus homesteaders in a territory run by Judge Roy Bean.
- Range War, a 2000 novel by Lauran Paine about the Johnson County War.
- The Virginian, a 1902 novel by Owen Wister, was based on the Johnson County Range War, presenting the case of the large ranchers and justifying the lynchings as frontier justice for cattle rustling. It was adapted four times as films.
- Shane is a 1953 movie (featuring Alan Ladd) that tells the story of a gunfighter taking the side of the farmers against cattlemen during a fictional range war loosely based on the Johnson County Range War.
- The Redhead from Wyoming a 1953 film with Maureen O'Hara featuring a fictionalised Johnson County War.
- Man Without a Star, 1955, with Kirk Douglas.
- To The Last Man: A Story of the Pleasant Valley War, is a novel by Western author Zane Grey exploring the Pleasant Valley War in 1880s Arizona.
- Oklahoma! (1943 Broadway musical, 1955 film) Rodgers and Hammerstein musical about a cowboy in love with a farm girl, complicated by a rivalry between local farmers and ranchers over fences and water rights.
- El Dorado is a 1966 movie about an aging gunfighter who goes "straight" to help a lawman friend after being hired to intervene in a range war.
- Centennial (1978) features an episode titled 'The Shepherds', which depicted a range war between cattlemen on one hand, against farmers and sheepherders on the other.
- Texas (1985) details the evolving conflicts due to the introduction of barbed wire in cattle country in the 1880s.
- Tom Horn (1980), scripted from the journals of Horn, Steve McQueen.
- "Johnson County War" is a 1989 song by Country Western singer/songwriter Chris LeDoux for the Powder River album.
- "The Range War," a ballad by Todd Rundgren, focuses on a relationship between a boy whose "uncle runs cattle" and a girl whose "daddy runs sheep," and hints their relationship was opposed by both families, fueling this particular range war.
- Open Range (2003), a film in which free-grazers take on a cattle baron who tries to use hired assassins to steal their herd.
- A range war was the subject of at least one episode of long-running old time radio show, Gunsmoke, called "Jaliscoe".
- King of Texas is a 2002 American television movie transposing the plot of William Shakespeare's King Lear into the 19th-century American West.
- 1923 (2023), a prequel to the Yellowstone franchise written by Taylor Sheridan, features a ranch war in several episodes.
- Several episodes of Have Gun Will Travel feature the conflict between farmers and ranchers over control of range land.
- The 2005 video game Gun also featured a range war described as the "Resistance" that was based around the Colfax County War.
- The 2009 Western game Call of Juarez: Bound in Blood features a side mission that was reminiscent of the Johnson County War, involving assisting a settler against a powerful cattleman.
- Range wars were featured in many stories depicting comic book character Jonah Hex. One of these is the story "Hanging Woman", which was adapted into a motion comic in 2010.

== See also ==
- County seat war
- Hell on the Range by Daniel Justin Herman
- List of feuds in the United States
- Sheep Wars
