= Hell on the Range =

History book by Daniel Justin Herman

Hell on the Range: A Story of Honor, Conscience, and the American West is a nonfiction book, a historical inquiry, by Daniel Justin Herman. The book was published by Yale University Press in 2010.

== Synopsis ==
Herman's book, Hell on the Range, pertains to the cultural history of Arizona's free range in the 1880s. It describes how certain groups of people competed for control of the land in the area known as Arizona's Rim Country, of which the Pleasant Valley War is a segment. Some of the competing groups in the book are Texas cowboys, Mormons, mixed-race ranchers, sheepherders and Jewish merchants.

Herman's historical research includes the American West and the American West's infamous borderlands. According to Taunalyn F Rutherford, reviewing this book for the BYU Studies Quarterly, this book covers ground similar to other works discussing vigilante justice, religion, and violence in the 1800s. Again according to Rutherford, Herman's main point is that the Rim Country War was more than just a fight over land and resources. It was also made complicated by family conflicts, racial tensions, and religious disagreements. Herman calls this a "battle between honor and conscience."

According to Herman, the culture of honor in the late 1800s was defined by physical courage, loyalty to family, protecting your family and reputation, showing off wealth, being welcoming to guests, gambling and drinking, and public shaming. In contrast, conscience was a different way of looking at the world. It was based on moral courage over physical courage, personal religious practices over family reputation, saving money and working hard over showing off wealth, sobriety and honesty over drinking and gambling, and encouraging and helping people over punishing and shaming them.
